= Watts, Griffis and McOuat Limited =

- Company type: Private limited company
- Industry: Engineering Mining Exploration
- Founded: 1962
- Headquarters: Toronto, Ontario, Canada
- Key people: Joe Hinzer, President; Jeff Plate, Vice President; Alain Kabemba, VP (Eng
- Number of employees: 15 (2024)
- Website: www.wgm.ca

Watts, Griffis and McOuat Limited ("WGM") is one of Canada's longest running independent firms of geological and mining consultants. Headquartered in Toronto, Ontario, Canada, the firm provides professional services to the global mineral resource industry, including exploration project management, property valuations, Mineral Resource and Reserve estimates, National Instrument 43-101 and JORC technical reports, and due diligence reviews.

== History ==
Established in 1962, the firm was co-founded by Murray Edmund Watts, Arthur Thomas Griffis, and Jack McOuat, each of whom has been inducted into the Canadian Mining Hall of Fame. WGM was a founding member of OMESE, the predecessor of CAMESE (Canadian Association of Mining Equipment and Services for Export).

== Affiliations ==
- Canadian Institute of Mining, Metallurgy and Petroleum (CIM)
- Prospectors and Developers Association of Canada (PDAC)
- Canadian Association of Mining Equipment and Services for Export (CAMESE)
- Association of Consulting Engineers of Canada (ACEC)
- Consulting Engineers of Ontario
- Association for Mineral Exploration British Columbia (AMEBC)
- China Mining Association
- Association of Professional Geoscientists of Ontario (APGO)
- Professional Engineers Ontario (PEO)
- Canadian Aboriginal Minerals Association (CAMA)
- United Nations Global Compact

== See also ==
- Canadian Mining Hall of Fame
- Prospectors and Developers Association of Canada
