= James M. Franklin =

Canadian geologist (1942–2024)

James McWillie Franklin FRSC (November 9, 1942 – June 19, 2024) was a Canadian geologist.

He was educated at Carleton University, earning a BSc in 1964 and a MSc in 1967. He then earned a PhD from the University of Western Ontario in 1970.

He was awarded the Selwyn G. Blaylock Medal of the Canadian Institute of Mining, Metallurgy and Petroleum in 2006, the Logan Medal of the Geological Association of Canada in 2008, and the Penrose Gold Medal of the Society of Economic Geologists in 2014. In 2019, he was inducted into the Canadian Mining Hall of Fame.

Franklin died on June 19, 2024, at the age of 81.
