= Mining Association of Canada =

Canadian trade association

- Formerly: Canadian Metal Mining Association (1935–65)
- Founded: 16 January 1935
- Headquarters: 275 Slater Street, Ottawa, Ontario
- Website: mining.ca

The Mining Association of Canada is a Canadian trade association that has existed since 1935. It focuses on sustainable practices and policies that aim to balance economic and environmental interests. The organization promotes responsible mining through initiatives related to safety, environmental stewardship, and community engagement.

== Ores ==
Canada's mining sector is the world's top producer of potash and ranks among the top five producers of various minerals, including aluminum, cobalt, diamonds, fluorspar, gemstones, gold, indium, niobium, palladium, platinum, tellurium, titanium concentrate, and uranium.

The 60 different minerals and metals that Canada's mining industry produces are essential raw materials for everyday products and advanced technologies that support the shift to a low-carbon economy. These range from fertilizers and building materials to smartphones, electric vehicles, and solar panels.

== Leadership ==
=== President (to 1987) and Chairman (from 1987) ===
- 1935 – James Young Murdoch KC

CMMA dormant from ca. 1939–1946

- 1946–1950 – James Gerald McCrea
- 1950 – Eldon L. Brown
- 1951, 1952, 1953 – J. A. H. Paterson
- 1954, 1955 – Horace J. Fraser
- 1956 – R. R. Brown
- 1957, 1958 – James Botterell Redpath
- 1959, 1960 – John Ross Bradfield
- 1961, 1962 – E. B. Gillanders
- 1963, 1964 – W. S. Row
- 1965, 1966 – William Stafford Kirkpatrick
- 1967, 1968 – John D. Barrington
- 1969, 1970 – John Kostiuk
- 1971, 1972 – F. Foster Todd
- 1973, 1974 – Charles R. Elliott
- 1975, 1976 – Alfred Powis
- 1977, 1978 – Mervyn Arthur Upham MBE
- 1979 – John McCreedy
- 1980, 1981 – David D. Thomas
- 1982, 1983 – Harold Thomas Fargey
- 1984, 1985 – Dr William Fleming James
- 1986, 1987 – Dr Walter Curlook

Title changes to Chairman at 1987 annual meeting

- 1988, 1989 – Norman B. Keevil Jr.
- 1992 – Anthony Julian Petrina
- 1993, 1994 – Louis P. Gignac
- 1995, 1996 – Dr Michael D. Sopko
- 1997, 1998 – Walter Thomas Segsworth
- 1999 – John Carrington
- 2000, 2001 – Guy G. Dufresne
- 2002, 2003 – James E. C. Carter
- 2004, 2005 – Richard Andrew Ross
- 2006 – Derek George Pannell
- 2006, 2007 – Peter Rhys Jones
- 2008, 2009 – James Kitchener Gowans
- 2010, 2011 – Douglas Hugh Horswill
- 2012 – Ian Pearce
- 2013, 2014 – Zoë Yujnovich
- 2015, 2016 – Robert Albert Steane
- 2017, 2018 – Anne Marie Toutant
- 2019, 2020 – Gordon Stothart
- 2021, 2022 – David Clarry
- 2023, 2024 – Carolyn Chisholm
- 2025, 2026 – Carol Plummer

=== General Manager (to 1987) and President (from 1987) ===
1. Victor Counsel Wansbrough, November 1946 – February 1968
2. John L. Bonus, February 1968 – October 1984
3. Dr C. George Miller, October 1984 – December 1997
4. Gordon R. Peeling, 15 December 1997 – 1 June 2011
5. Pierre Gratton, 1 June 2011 – present
