= Penrose Gold Medal =

The R.A.F. Penrose Gold Medal was established in 1923 and is awarded by the Society of Economic Geologists (SEG) to recognize a full career in the performance of "unusually original work in the earth sciences". The medal was donated by American geologist and founding President of the SEG Richard A.F. Penrose Jr. At the time of its donation, Penrose was explicit in his desire that the medal be awarded for achievements in pure geological science, rather than in the application of science to the discovery of mineral deposits.

== Recipients ==
Source: SEG

- 1924 Thomas Chrowder Chamberlin
- 1928 Johan Herman Lie Vogt
- 1928 Waldemar Lindgren
- 1931 David White
- 1933 Louis de Launay
- 1935 Charles Kenneth Leith
- 1939 Reno H. Sales
- 1942 William H. Emmons
- 1944 Walter Curran Mendenhall
- 1947 Bert S. Butler
- 1950 Louis Caryl Graton
- 1952 Paul Fourmarier
- 1956 Donnel F. Hewett
- 1959 John S. Brown
- 1962 Alan M. Bateman
- 1965 Thomas S. Lovering
- 1968 Guilbert H. Cady
- 1971 Haddon King
- 1974 Charles A. Anderson
- 1976 Harold L. James
- 1978 Paul Ramdohr
- 1982 Charles Meyer
- 1985 Eugene N. Cameron
- 1987 Duncan R. Derry
- 1988 Edwin W. Roedder
- 1989 Desmond A. Pretorius
- 1991 William C. Kelly
- 1992 Donald E. White
- 1993 Richard L. Stanton
- 1994 Paul B. Barton
- 1995 Heinrich D. Holland
- 1997 Spencer R. Titley
- 1998 John M. Guilbert
- 1999 J. Julian Hemley
- 2000 Alberto Benavides de la Quintana
- 2001 Hubert L. Barnes
- 2002 Anthony J. Naldrett
- 2003 J. David Lowell
- 2004 Richard W. Hutchinson
- 2005 Minze Stuiver
- 2006 Stephen E. Kesler
- 2007 Michael Solomon
- 2008 Marco T. Einaudi
- 2009 David Groves
- 2010 David L. Leach
- 2011 Robert J. Kerrich
- 2012 Robert O. Rye
- 2013 Noel C. White
- 2014 James M. Franklin
- 2015 Richard H. Sillitoe
- 2016 Steven D. Scott
- 2017 Christoph A. Heinrich
- 2018 Anthony E. Williams-Jones
- 2021 Lawrence M. Cathles III
- 2022 Ross Large
- 2023 Richard J. Goldfarb
- 2024 Holly J. Stein

== See also ==
- List of geology awards
- Prizes named after people
- Gold medal awards
