= Canadian Mining Certification Program =

The Canadian Mining Certification Program (CMCP), under the coordination of the Mining Industry Human Resources Council (MIHR), began in 2006 with the development of the three National Occupation Standards (NOS) for the Canadian mining industry. The CMCP encompasses both the accreditation of training and the certification of workers within the mining industry.

The CMCP recognizes the skills, knowledge and experience of mining workers, provide workers with portable credentials, and accredit training programs for mining workers.

Moreover, the CMCP aims to provide employers with a comprehensive, objective way to verify the skills, knowledge and experience of workers, target training requirements, and enable workers from other industries to make smooth transitions to jobs in the Canadian mining industry.

The credentials gained through the CMCP are designed to help to ensure mining industry employers, workers and educators understand and consistently use the same terms when discussing and considering specific job requirements, mining qualifications and worker abilities.
