= Thomas S. Lovering =

American geologist

- Born: May 12, 1896; St. Paul, Minnesota
- Died: April 9, 1991 (aged 94)
- Education: University of Minnesota (ME, MS, PhD)
- Scientific career
- Fields: Geology
- Workplaces: United States Geological Survey; University of Michigan

Thomas "Tom" Seward Lovering (May 12, 1896, St. Paul, Minnesota – April 9, 1991, Santa Barbara, California) was an American geologist, known for his innovative field and laboratory research on relations between mineable ore deposits and hydrothermal alteration of wall rock.

== Biography ==
Lovering was born on April 9th, 1896 in St. Paul, Minnesota.

During World War I, Lovering volunteered for the U.S. Navy and was trained as a naval aviator, but the war ended before he was assigned to combat duty. In 1919, he matriculated at the University of Minnesota School of Mines, where he graduated in 1922 with an E.M. (engineer of mines) degree. He then became a graduate student in geology at the University of Minnesota. There, he graduated in 1923 with an M.S. in geology and in 1924 with a Ph.D. in economic geology. At the University of Minnesota, he learned from his professors Frank F. Grout and John W. Gruner about the hydrothermal processes that form ores.

For the academic year 1924–1925, Lovering was an instructor in the University of Arizona's department of geology.

In 1925, he joined the U.S. Geological Survey (USGS) to do research, under the supervision of Bert Sylvenus Butler (1877–1960), on mining districts in Colorado's Front Range. In 1934, Lovering resigned from the USGS and became an associate professor in the University of Michigan's department of geology and mineralogy. From 1934 to 1942 he performed extensive laboratory investigations as a professor and during the summers he worked in Colorado for the USGS by investigating mining districts and participating in regional mapping projects in geology.

In 1942, Lovering took a leave of absence from the University of Michigan to rejoin the USGS full-time for war service during World War II. He worked in the USGS's Strategic Minerals Program and produced several reports on ore bodies in Colorado. In 1943, Prentice-Hall published his book Minerals in World Affairs, which explains the importance of various essential minerals in terms of utilization, technology, geology, and international distribution.

After World War II ended, he resumed his professorship at the University of Michigan for the academic year, but resigned in 1947 to accept a permanent position in the USGS's Mineral Deposits Branch. He continued this employment until 1966 when he retired at age 70.

In retirement, he lived in Lakewood, Colorado (near USGS regional headquarters) for about 10 years. During his retirement years, he held an appointment as research professor at the University of Arizona and lectured at the University of Texas at Austin and the University of Utah at Salt Lake City. In 1976 he moved from Lakewood, Colorado to Santa Barbara, California, where he became a research associate at the University of California, Santa Barbara.

Throughout his career, Lovering researched geochemistry of wall-rock alterations caused by magmatic hydrothermal effects, as typified in Colorado's Boulder County tungsten and gold district and in Utah's East Tintic mining district. Some of his geological and hydrothermal alteration maps were widely used in Utah by private mining and exploration groups, leading to the discovery of ore deposits and the development of two major new mines.

== Personal life ==
In October 1919, Thomas S. Lovering married Alexina Corinne Gray (1895–1969), and had a son, Thomas G. Lovering (1921–1996). After his first wife died, Thomas S. Lovering married Mildred Stewart, who died in 1983.

== Awards and honors ==
In 1949, Lovering was elected a member of the National Academy of Sciences. In 1965 the Society of Economic Geologists (SEG) awarded him the Penrose Gold Medal. In 1965 he also received the Daniel C. Jackling Award from the American Institute of Mining, and Metallurgical Engineers (AIMME).

== Selected publications ==
- Lovering, T. S. (1927). "Organic precipitation of metallic copper" (PDF). Bulletin 795-C, Contributions to Economic Geology, Part I. Washington, DC: U.S. Government Printing Office: 45–52.
- Lovering, Thomas Seward (1934). Geology and Ore Deposits of the Breckenridge Mining District, Colorado. LCCN gs34000192.
- Lovering, Thomas Seward (1935). Geology and Ore Deposits of the Montezuma Quadrangle, Colorado. LCCN gs35000230.
- Lovering, T. S. (1935). "Theory of heat conduction applied to geological problems". Geological Society of America Bulletin. 46 (1): 69–94. Bibcode:1935GSAB...46...69L. doi:10.1130/GSAB-46-69.
- Lovering, T. S. (1936). "Heat Conduction in Dissimilar Rocks and the Use of Thermal Models". Geological Society of America Bulletin. 47 (1): 87–100. Bibcode:1936GSAB...47...87L. doi:10.1130/GSAB-47-87.
- Lovering, Thomas Seward (1941). "The origin of the tungsten ores of Boulder County, Colorado". Economic Geology. 36 (3): 229–279. Bibcode:1941EcGeo..36..229L. doi:10.2113/gsecongeo.36.3.229.
- Lovering, T. S. (1949). Rock Alteration as a Guide to Ore—East Tintic District, Utah. doi:10.5382/Mono.01. hdl:2027/mdp.39015006837820. ISBN 978-1-9349-6996-0.
- Lovering, T. S. (1950). Geology and ore deposits of the Front Range, Colorado. Washington DC: U. S. Government Printing Office. LCCN unk82030104; 319 p. maps (part fold., part col.) diagrs. (part fold.) cm.
- Lovering, Thomas Seward; Huff, Lyman Coleman; Almond, Hy (1950). "Dispersion of copper from the San Manuel copper deposit, Pinal County, Arizona". Economic Geology. 45 (6): 493–514. Bibcode:1950EcGeo..45..493L. doi:10.2113/gsecongeo.45.6.493.
- Lovering, T. S.; Tweto, Ogden (1953). Geology and ore deposits of the Boulder County tungsten district, Colorado. Geological Survey (U.S.). Professional paper, 245. Washington, DC: U.S. Government Printing Office. LCCN gs54000292. OCLC 4032119Prepared in cooperation with the State of Colorado through the Colorado Geological Survey board and the Colorado Metal Mining Fund; viii+199 p. illus., maps, diagrs., plans, tables. 29 cm.
- Lovering, T. S. (1955). "Temperatures in and Near Intrusions". Fiftieth Anniversary Volume<subtitle>1905-1955</subtitle>. doi:10.5382/AV50.07. ISBN 978-1-9349-6952-6.
- Lovering, T. S. (1959). "Significance of Accumulator Plants in Rock Weathering". Geological Society of America Bulletin. 70 (6): 781. doi:10.1130/0016-7606(1959)70[781:SOAPIR]2.0.CO;2. ISSN 0016-7606.
- Lovering, T. S. (1961). "Sulfide ores formed from sulfide-deficient solutions". Economic Geology. 56 (1): 68–99. Bibcode:1961EcGeo..56...68L. doi:10.2113/gsecongeo.56.1.68.
- Lovering, Thomas Seward (1963). "Epigenetic, diplogenetic, syngenetic, and lithogene deposits". Economic Geology. 58 (3): 315–331. Bibcode:1963EcGeo..58..315L. doi:10.2113/gsecongeo.58.3.315.
- Lovering, T.S.; Tweto, Ogden; Lovering, T.G. (1978). "Ore deposits of the Gilman District, Eagle County, Colorado". doi:10.3133/pp1017.
- Morris, Hal Tryon; Lovering, Thomas Seward (1979). General Geology and Mines of the East Tintic Mining District, Utah and Juab Counties, Utah.
