= Duncan R. Derry =

English-born Canadian geologist (1906–1987)

Dr. Duncan R. Derry
- Born: 1906; England
- Died: 1987 (aged 80–81); Canada
- Citizenship: Canadian
- Education: University of Cambridge; University of Toronto
- Known for: Creation of the World Atlas of Geological and Mineral Deposits
- Awards: Logan Medal (1970); Selwyn G. Blaylock Medal; Penrose Gold Medal (1987)
- Scientific career
- Fields: Economic Geologist
- Workplaces: Falconbridge Ltd. Rio Tinto Group

Duncan R. Derry, OC (1906–1987) was an internationally known English-Canadian economic geologist. He was largely responsible for the creation of the World Atlas of Geological and Mineral Deposits.

== Education ==
Derry was born in England. He obtained an honor science degree from University of Cambridge before moving to Canada. He attended the University of Toronto and obtained his M.A. and Ph.D. degrees in geology.

== Career ==
In 1935, he started work at Ventures Ltd., which later became Falconbridge Ltd. Derry worked closely with Thayer Lindsley. He supervised exploration and mining programs in Canada and many other countries, including South Africa, Greece, Guyana, Chile, Peru, and Greenland. His work at Venture was interrupted by World War II. He enlisted and served as a squadron leader navigation training officer.

In 1950, he compiled a tectonic map of Canada with John Sinclair Stevenson. It was the first time in Canada that structural data from government, university, and industry sources were combined and synthesized.

In 1954, Derry became president of Rio Tinto Exploration. He was a part of the acquisition and development of the Rio Algom's bit uranium mines in the Elliot Lake area of Ontario. In 1960, he left Rio to be a founding partner of the consulting firm Derry Michener Booth & Wahl.

Dr. Derry spent three years researching, compiling, funding and publishing the World Atlas of Geological and Mineral Deposits. In reference to his work on this textbook and his induction, the representative of the Canadian Mining Hall of Fame expressed that he, "added immeasurably not only to the advancement of the geological sciences and their practical application to mining development in Canada and elsewhere, but to the publication of world literature in the field."

Dr. Derry was a past-president of the Society of Economic Geologists. He was a part of founding Geological Association of Canada, the Canadian Geological Foundation, and the Canadian Geoscience Council.

== Honours ==
- 1970, awarded the Logan Medal by the Geological Association of Canada
- Bestowed an honorary degree of Doctor of Laws from the University of Toronto
- 1974, awarded the Selwyn G. Blaylock Medal by the Canadian Institute of Mining, Metallurgy and Petroleum
- Since 1980, the Geological Association of Canada has awarded the Duncan R. Derry Medal annually to the outstanding economic geologist who has made significant contributions in the field in Canada.
