= Heinrich Holland =

American scientist (1927 – 2012)

Heinrich Dieter 'Dick' Holland (May 27, 1927 – May 21, 2012) was an emeritus professor in the Earth and Planetary Sciences department of Harvard University. He made major contributions to the understanding of the Earth's geochemistry, especially large-scale geochemical and biogeochemical cycles. He has also contributed to the field of planetary chemistry and planetary evolution.

== Personal life ==
Holland was born on May 27, 1927, to Jewish parents in Mannheim, Germany. He escaped Nazi Germany by Kindertransport to England. He was reunited with his family in the Dominican Republic. They moved to the United States in 1940 where they first resided at Kew Gardens in New York.

Holland was married for 57 years to Alice. They had four children, three boys and one girl.

== Education and career ==
Holland received his bachelor's degree in chemistry (high honors) in 1946 from Princeton University. He served in the U.S. Army from 1946 to 1947 at Fort Bliss, Texas on secret and classified government projects with Wernher von Braun. In 1947 he entered graduate school at Columbia University, receiving a master’s degree in 1948 and Ph.D. in 1952, both in geology. He served on the faculty of Princeton University from 1950 to 1972, rising from the rank of instructor to full professor.

Holland moved to Harvard University in 1972. He later became the Harvard Harry C. Dudley Professor of Economic Geology. In 2006 he retired from Harvard and became a visiting scholar in the Department of Earth and Environmental Science at the University of Pennsylvania, where he remained active in research and writing until his death. During his career he held visiting appointments at University of Oxford, Durham University, University of Hawaiʻi, Heidelberg University, Penn State, Imperial College, London, and Hebrew University, Jerusalem.

He was vice president of the Geochemical Society from 1969 to 1970 and president from 1970 to 1971.

== Awards ==
Holland was a member of the National Academy of Sciences and a Fellow of the American Academy of Arts and Sciences. His awards included the V.M. Goldschmidt Award of the Geochemical Society(1994), the Penrose Gold Medal of the Society of Economic Geologists (1995), and the Leopold von Busch Medal of the Deutsche Geologische Gesellschaft (1998).

== Death ==
Holland died from cancer aged 84 on May 21, 2012, in Wynnewood, Pennsylvania.

== Publications ==
- The Chemistry of the Atmosphere and Oceans, May 1978. John Wiley & Sons. ISBN 978-0471035091
- The Chemical Evolution of the Ocean and Atmosphere, July 1, 1984. Princeton University Press. ISBN 978-0691023816
- Living Dangerously November 28, 1995, Princeton University Press. (with Ulrich Petersen). ISBN 978-0691032665
