= Richard Porritt =

Richard Porritt may refer to:

- Richard Porritt (businessman) (1901–1985), Canadian mining industry executive
- Richard Porritt (politician) (1910–1940), British politician
