= Jingli Luo =

Chinese and Canadian chemical engineer

Jingli Luo is a Chinese and Canadian chemical engineer focusing on surface science, and particularly on catalysis, fuel cells, corrosion resistance, and carbon capture. She is a professor in the Chemical and Materials Engineering Department at the University of Alberta.

== Education and career ==
Luo received a bachelor's degree in physics and chemistry of metals from the University of Science and Technology Beijing (then known as the Beijing University of Iron and Steel Technology) in 1982. After continuing as an instructor at the university for four years, she continued her education in materials science and engineering at McMaster University in Canada, where she received a doctorate in 1992 under the supervision of M. B. Ives.

She was a postdoctoral researcher at McMaster and at the Royal Military College of Canada, working there with Pierre R. Roberge. In 1995 she joined the University of Alberta as an assistant professor; she was promoted to associate professor in 1999 and full professor in 2002. From 2004 to 2015 she held a Canada Research Chair in Alternative Fuel Cells.

== Recognition ==
Luo is a Fellow of the Canadian Academy of Engineering, elected in 2016.

She was the 2002 recipient of the Morris Cohen Award of MetSoc, the Metallurgical Society of the Canadian Institute of Mining, Metallurgy and Petroleum. She received the Canadian Metal Chemistry Award at the Canadian Materials Science Conference, given "to recognize outstanding contributions to metallurgical chemistry", in 2014.
