= Geren =

Geren is a surname. Notable people with the surname include:

- Bob Geren (born 1961), American baseball player
- Charlie Geren (born 1949), American politician
- Pete Geren (born 1952), American politician
- Preston Geren Jr. (1923–2013), American architect and father of Charlie and Pete Geren
- Preston Geren Sr. (1891–1969), American architect and engineer and father of Preston Geren Jr.
- Richard Geren (1917-2002), American geologist

Geren may also refer to:

- Geren, a village in Foça, İzmir, Türkiye
