= CAMESE =

Canadian trade organization

The Canadian Association of Mining Equipment and Services for Export (CAMESE) is a Mississauga-based trade organization supporting the export of Canadian mining exploration equipment and services to mining companies around the world. The organization introduces foreign mining companies to Canadian suppliers by publicizing the expertise and success of domestic mining technologies and mining operations.

Traditionally assisting with market development in the Americas and Russia, CAMESE is making new efforts to support Canadian mining exporters in India and other Asian countries.

CAMESE also supports foreign direct investment in Canadian mining operations.

== Services ==
CAMESE organizes and participates in mining trade shows (such as internationally known annual Prospectors & Developers Association of Canada (PDAC) in Toronto, see), industry networking events, policy roundtables, and publishes an Annual Compendium of Canadian mining equipment suppliers and service companies (Compendium of Canadian Mining Suppliers request form at http://www.camese.org/request.cfm), digital version viewable at http://www.camese.org/current

Services are provided in English, French, and Spanish, covering the languages of the major mining areas in North America, and South America.

== Membership ==
More than 250 equipment suppliers, manufacturers and service providers are members of the organization, including Export Development Canada (EDC), Geosoft, Gowling Lafleur Henderson LLP (Gowlings), Phoenix Geophysics, the Prospectors & Developers Association of Canada (PDAC), and Hatch Together, these companies represent a significant portion of the Canadian mine services and mining exploration industry, in turn representing thousands of technicians, engineers, geologists, and geophysicists and millions of dollars of export revenue each year. Much of this employment is located in Northern Ontario, well known for its large mineral deposits (especially of nickel) and extraction programmes by major mining companies including Vale and Glencore.

In turn, CAMESE is a member of the Prospectors & Developers Association of Canada (PDAC).

== History ==
Founded in 1981 by Canadian mining exporters operating in Lima, Peru, CAMESE celebrated its 25th year of industry advocacy and support in 2006. Membership has grown since the early 1990s, and CAMESE has become the leading Canadian mining equipment and services export association.

== Funding ==
Funding for CAMESE is provided by annual membership dues, grants from the Canadian federal government EDC, and grants from the Ontario provincial government.

== See also ==
- Prospectors & Developers Association of Canada (PDAC)
- Canadian Institute of Mining, Metallurgy and Petroleum
- Geological Association of Canada
- Reflection seismology
- Geophysics
- Exploration geophysics
- Society of Exploration Geophysicists
