= Selwyn G. Blaylock Medal =

Mining award in Canada

The Selwyn G. Blaylock Medal or Selwyn Blaylock Canadian Mining Excellence Award was established in 1948 and is awarded annually by the Canadian Institute of Mining, Metallurgy and Petroleum to an individual that has demonstrated distinguished service to Canada through exceptional achievement in the field of mining, metallurgy, or geology.

The medal honours Selwyn G. Blaylock, one of the pioneers in the mining industry in western Canada. He was president of Cominco, recipient of several international awards for his work in metallurgy, and was the President of the Institute in 1934-35.

== Past Recipients ==
Source: Selwyn Blaylock Award Past Winners

- 2018 - Peter N. Calder
- 2017 - John R. Goode
- 2016 - Charles A. Jeannes
- 2015 - Not awarded
- 2014 - Not awarded
- 2013 - Not awarded
- 2012 - Stephen Quin
- 2011 - John W. Chisholm
- 2010 - Philip J. Mackay
- 2009 - Alastair J. Sinclair
- 2008 - Paul W.A. Severin
- 2007 - Russell E. Hallbauer
- 2006 - James M. Franklin
- 2005 - Eberhard Scherkus
- 2004 - Louis J. Cabri
- 2003 - John Carrington
- 2002 - John D. Dutrizac
- 2001 - Kenneth G. Thomas
- 2000 - A. M. (Sandy) Laird
- 1999 - Not awarded
- 1998 - Richard O. Burt
- 1997 - T. R. Meadowcroft
- 1996 - Owen E. Owens
- 1995 - William Petruk
- 1994 - Poul Hansen
- 1993 - A. J. Petrina
- 1992 - Côme Carbonneau
- 1991 - Henry K. Imorde
- 1990 - Norman B. Keevil, Jr.
- 1989 - M. David
- 1988 - L. G. Langlois
- 1987 - D. J. Emery
- 1986 - M. Lefebvre
- 1985 - R. G. Duthie
- 1984 - C. E. Michener
- 1983 - L. Brossard
- 1982 - A. H. Ross
- 1981 - P. Harrison
- 1980 - J. G. Stabback
- 1979 - George Furnival
- 1978 - A. E. Moss
- 1977 - L. Piuze
- 1976 - K. M. Dewar
- 1975 - R. V. Porritt
- 1974 - Duncan R. Derry
- 1973 - W. J. Riva
- 1972 - A. Ignatieff
- 1971 - George W. Govier
- 1970 - J. N. Anderson
- 1969 - W. S. Kirkpatrick
- 1968 - Eldon Leslie Brown
- 1967 - N. B. Davis
- 1966 - J. M. Harrison
- 1965 - L. Djingheuzian
- 1964 - H. F. Fraser
- 1963 - B. S. W. Buffam
- 1962 - J. Y. Murdoch
- 1961 - R. R. McNaughton
- 1960 - T. A. Link
- 1959 - J. T. Wilson
- 1958 - T. Lindsley
- 1957 - Franc R. Joubin
- 1956 - J. Convey
- 1955 - J. R. Timmins
- 1954 - J. G. L. McCrea
- 1953 - M. F. Goudge
- 1952 - J. A. Retty
- 1951 - C. O. Swanson
- 1950 - M. E. Wilson
- 1948 - R. W. Diamond

== See also ==
- List of geology awards
