= Maurice Brown =

Maurice Brown may refer to:

- Maurice Brown (RAF officer) (1919–2012), British World War II fighter pilot with the Royal Air Force
- Maurice J. E. Brown (1906–1975), British musicologist and Schubert scholar
- Maurice "Mobetta" Brown (born 1981), American musician, trumpeter for the Tedeschi Trucks Band
- Maurice Russell Brown (1912–2008), Canadian mining journalist

== See also ==
- Maurice Browne (disambiguation)
