= Graham Farquharson =

Canadian mining engineer (1940–2022)

Graham Farquharson CM (1940–2022) was a Canadian mining engineer and executive who was inducted into the Canadian Mining Hall of Fame in 2011 and the Order of Canada in 2021. He is known for his work in the development of underground mining methods.

== Career ==
Farquharson began his career as a mining engineer, gaining experience in underground mines in Canada and South Africa. He later joined Inco Limited (now Vale), where he held various roles, including Vice President of Underground Mining. In this capacity, he oversaw the design and construction of several underground mines. Farquharson is credited with implementing Inco's "room-and-pillar" mining technique, which enhanced the efficiency and safety of underground operations. During his tenure, Inco's Copper Cliff Deep Mine emerged as one of the more productive underground mines in the worlds.

Farquharson was a director of the Mining Industry Human Resources Council. He was inducted into the Canadian Mining Hall of Fame in 2010 in recognition of his contributions to the mining industry.

== Philanthropy ==
In addition to his accomplishments in the mining industry, Graham Farquharson is also known for his philanthropy. He was actively involved in supporting education and community development and donated significant time and resources to a variety of charitable causes.

One of Farquharson's major philanthropic efforts was his support of education. He was involved with a number of educational institutions and served on the boards of several universities and colleges. He was also a major donor to educational institutions and scholarship funds, with a particular focus on supporting students pursuing careers in the mining industry.

Farquharson was also actively involved in supporting community development, particularly in Northern Ontario. He was a strong advocate for the development of sustainable communities in the region and provided financial support and leadership to a number of community development projects.

His contributions to community development have also been recognized by various organizations. He received the Paul Harris Fellow Award from Rotary International in recognition of his philanthropic efforts. He has also been honored by the Ontario government with a prestigious Northern Ontario Heritage Award for his contributions to economic development in the region.

Farquharson's philanthropic work shows a deep understanding of the importance of education and the role it plays in the sustainable development of communities. His contributions have had a positive impact on education and community development in Canada and his legacy continues to be felt through the work of the organizations and initiatives he supported.
