= Gerald Grandey =

Canadian executive (born 1946)

Gerald W. (Jerry) Grandey CM SOM (born 1946, Long Beach, California) is a Canadian and US executive who was previously the President and Chief Executive Officer of Cameco Corporation, one of the world's largest uranium producers. He joined Cameco in 1993 as Senior Vice President, and was appointed President in 2000 and CEO in 2003. In 2010, The Harvard Business Review recognized him as being one of the top 100 CEOs in the world because of the value created for shareholders during his tenure. Grandey retired from Cameco in 2011.

Inducted into the Canadian Mining Hall of Fame in 2013, Grandey was awarded the Canadian Nuclear Association's Ian McRae Award in 2012 for his work in advancing nuclear energy in Canada. In 2011, he was nominated for the Oslo Business for Peace Award in recognition of his efforts to facilitate the dismantling of 20,000 Russian warheads (Megatons to Megawatts), with the resulting uranium used in nuclear energy plants for the generation of electricity. The US Nuclear Energy Institute (NEI) awarded Grandey the William S. Lee Award for leadership in the nuclear industry, noting his work to implement the Megatons to Megawatts agreement between the US and Russia.

In 2020, Grandey was named as a recipient of the Saskatchewan Order of Merit. Established in 1985, the Saskatchewan Order of Merit is a recognition of excellence, achievement and contributions to the social, cultural and economic well-being of the province of Saskatchewan and its residents. The Order takes precedence over all other provincial honours and awards. In 2022, Grandey was awarded the Queen Elizabeth II Platinum Jubilee Medal which was created to celebrate the 70th anniversary year of her late Majesty Queen Elizabeth II’s Accession to the Throne. The Jubilee Medal honours an individual’s contributions to the province of Saskatchewan. In 2025, Grandey was presented the King Charles III Coronation Medal which recognized individuals who have made a significant contribution to Canada or to a particular province, territory, region of, or community in, Canada, or attained an outstanding achievement abroad that brings credit to Canada. At the end of 2025, Grandey was appointed by the Governor General of Canada to the Order of Canada. The Order of Canada is the cornerstone of the Canadian Honours System.

Currently, Grandey serves as Chairman of the board of Rare Elements Resources, a mineral resource company focused on rare earth extraction and separation, and is a director of ECOVAP, Inc., a company with novel wastewater disposal and water recovery technologies. Formerly, Grandey was Chairman of the Board of Governor's for the Colorado School of Mines Foundation and was a member of the boards of Nutrien Ltd, the world's largest provider of crop nutrients, inputs and services, Potash Corporation of Saskatchewan, Canadian Oil Sands, Inmet Mining Corporation, Centerra Gold Inc., Sandspring Resources and Bruce Power. Grandey has a degree in geophysical engineering from the Colorado School of Mines and a juris doctor degree from Northwestern University. He is Chairman Emeritus of the London based, World Nuclear Association.

Grandey was a 1964 graduate of Downey (California) Senior High School. He was a National Merit Scholar and a multi-year letterman in both swimming and water polo. In the late 1960s, Mr. Grandey spent two years in the United States military. He is married with two grown children and four grandchildren.
