= Mary River (Nunavut) =

River on Baffin Island, Nunavut, Canada

Coordinates: 71°10′59″N 079°21′00″W

Mary River is located on Baffin Island in the Qikiqtaaluk Region of Nunavut, about 936 km (582 mi) northwest of the capital, Iqaluit, and about 176 km (109 mi) southwest of Pond Inlet Inuktitut: Mittimatalik, lit. 'the place where the landing place is' The Inuit, name for the Mary River mountain is Nuluyait, meaning buttocks. There is a 4,000 year history in the area. For hundreds of years the semi-nomadic Inuit from the region that includes the hamlets of Pond Inlet and Igloolik, met at Mary River during the summer hunting caribou. By 2011, the population of the region was about 5,400 people, many of whom continued the traditional hunting and fishing lifestyle living off the land.

A Canadian prospector found rich iron ore deposits in 1962 but it was only in the 2010s that a mining project was developed. In March 2011, a private equity fund in the United States and Luxembourg-based ArcelorMittal SA, the largest steel maker in the world, jointly purchased the small Toronto-based public Canadian company, Baffinland Iron Mines Corporation, that had owned the Mary River lease since the 1980s. The Mary River open pit iron ore mine became operational in 2015.

== Traditional Inuit lands ==
There is a 4,000 year history in the area. For hundreds of years the semi-nomadic Inuit met at Mary River during the summer hunting caribou. By 2011, there were about 5,400 people living within a 400 kilometres radius, many of whom continue to live off the land, hunting caribou herds. Wildlife in the region includes polar bears, foxes, ermines, lemmings, and hares, as well as caribou herds, and in the coastal waters—walrus, seals, beluga, whales, and narwhals.

== Mary River Mine ==
In 1962 Murray Edmund Watts and Ron Sheardown found a rich iron ore deposit. When Watts died, a small Toronto-based company, Baffinland Iron Mines Corporation, became the new owners. In 2008 railway enthusiasts anticipated the construction of a railway in the far north to the proposed mine at Mary River.

In March 2011, a private equity fund in the United States and Luxembourg-based ArcelorMittal SA, the largest steel maker in the world, jointly purchased the small Toronto-based public Canadian company, Baffinland Iron Mines Corporation, that had owned the Mary River lease since the 1980s. The Mary River open pit iron ore mine became operational in 2015.

There is a small airstrip, Mary River Aerodrome, located near the river.

Mary River
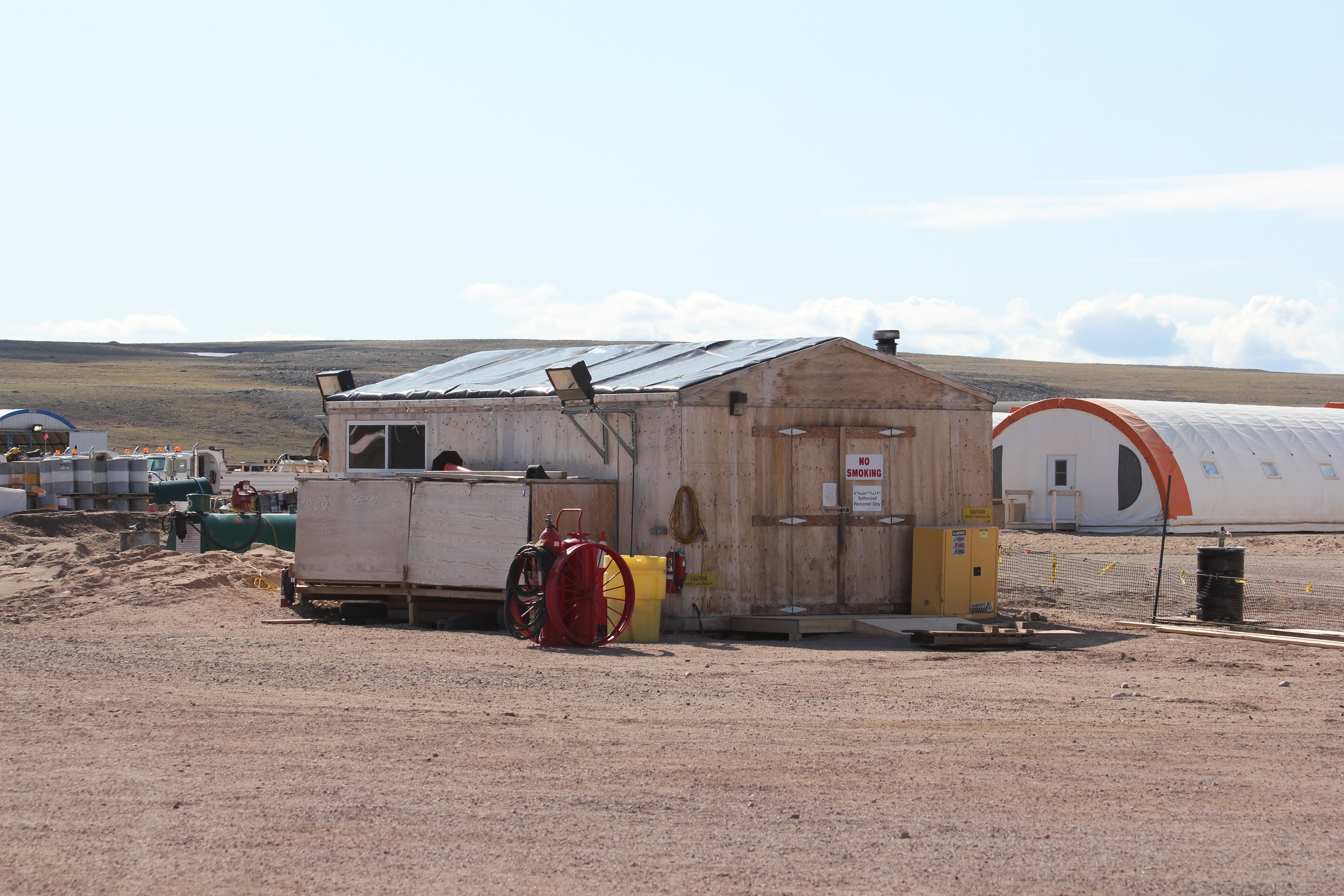
Mary River Aerodrome

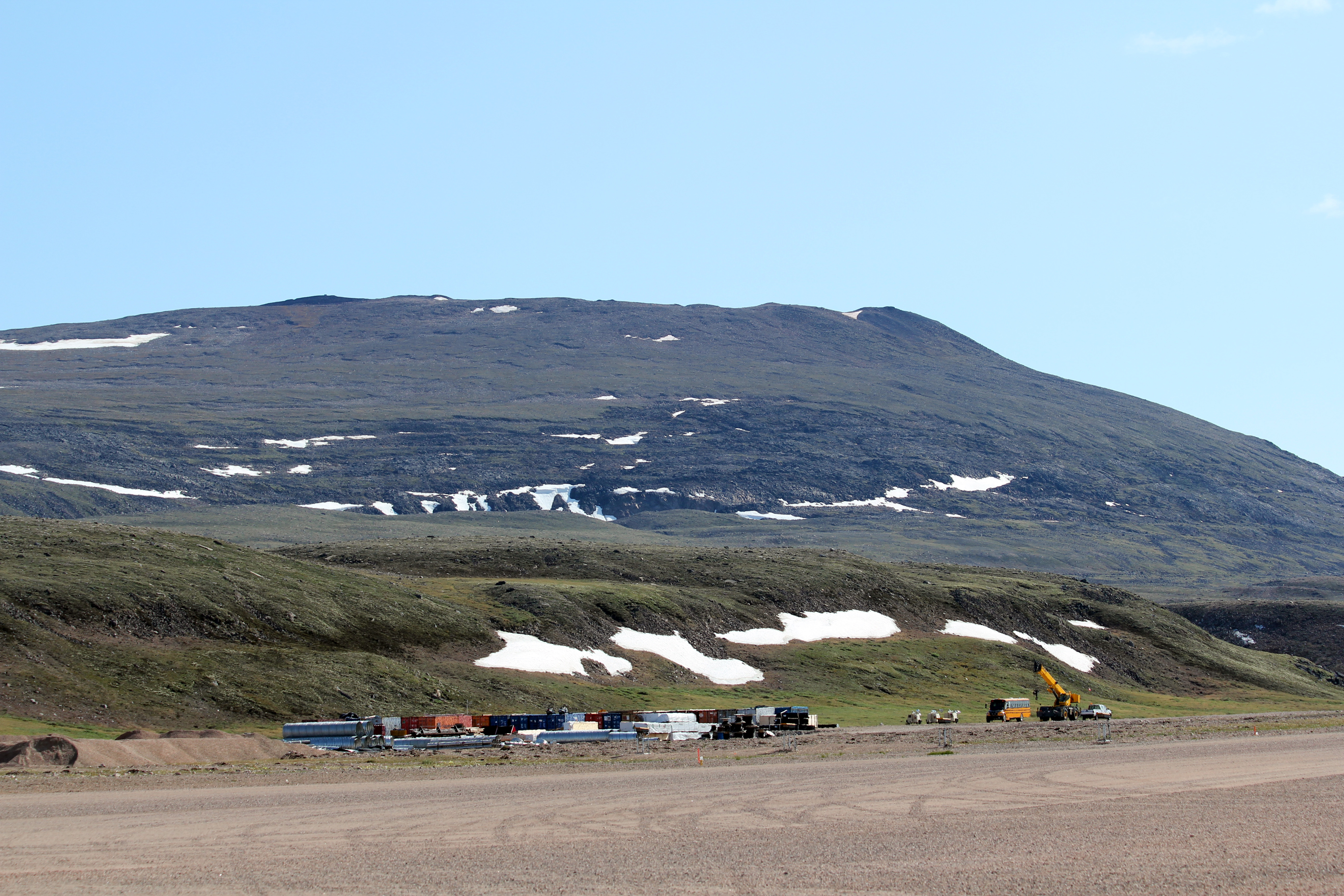
Mary River mine site

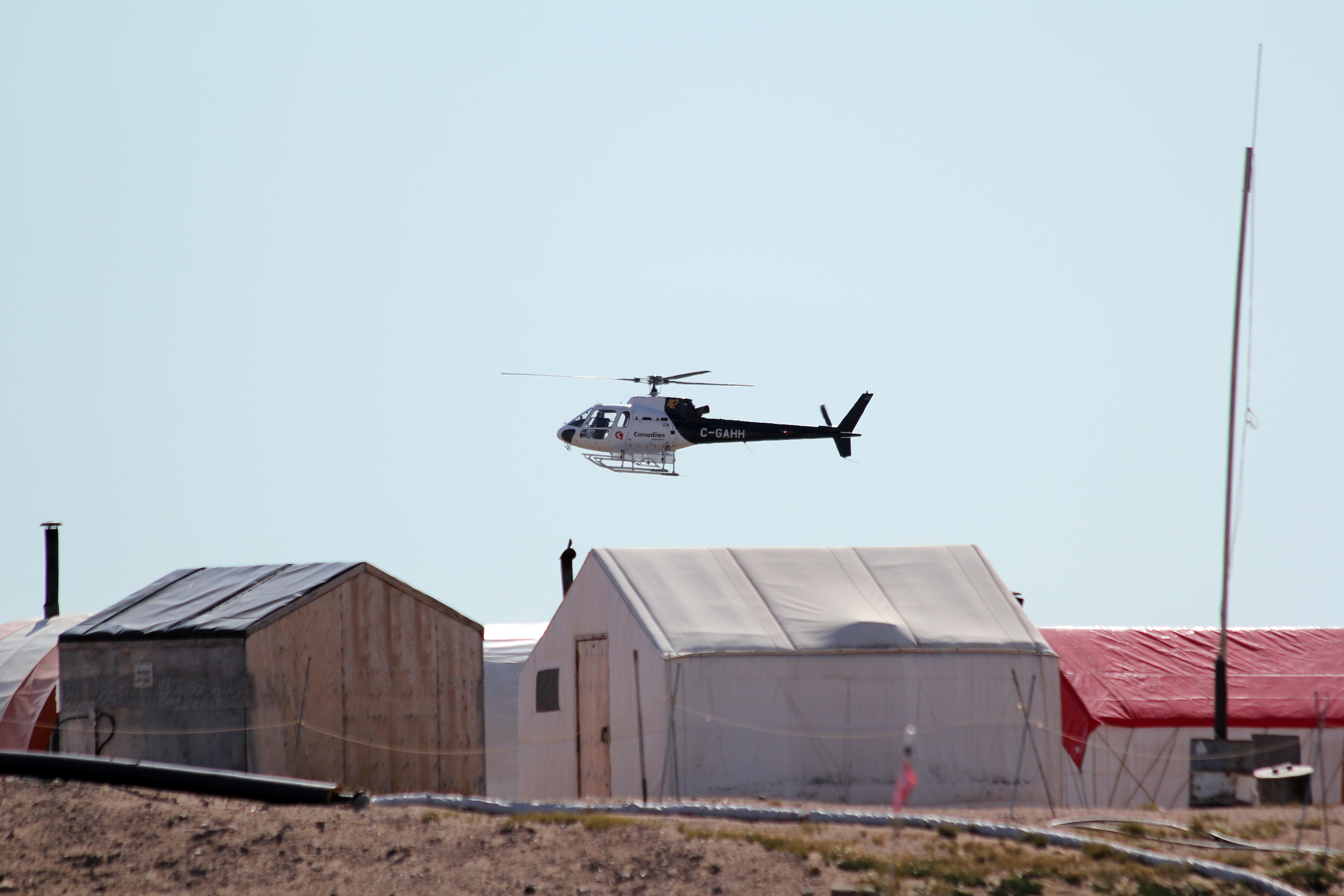
Mary River mine site

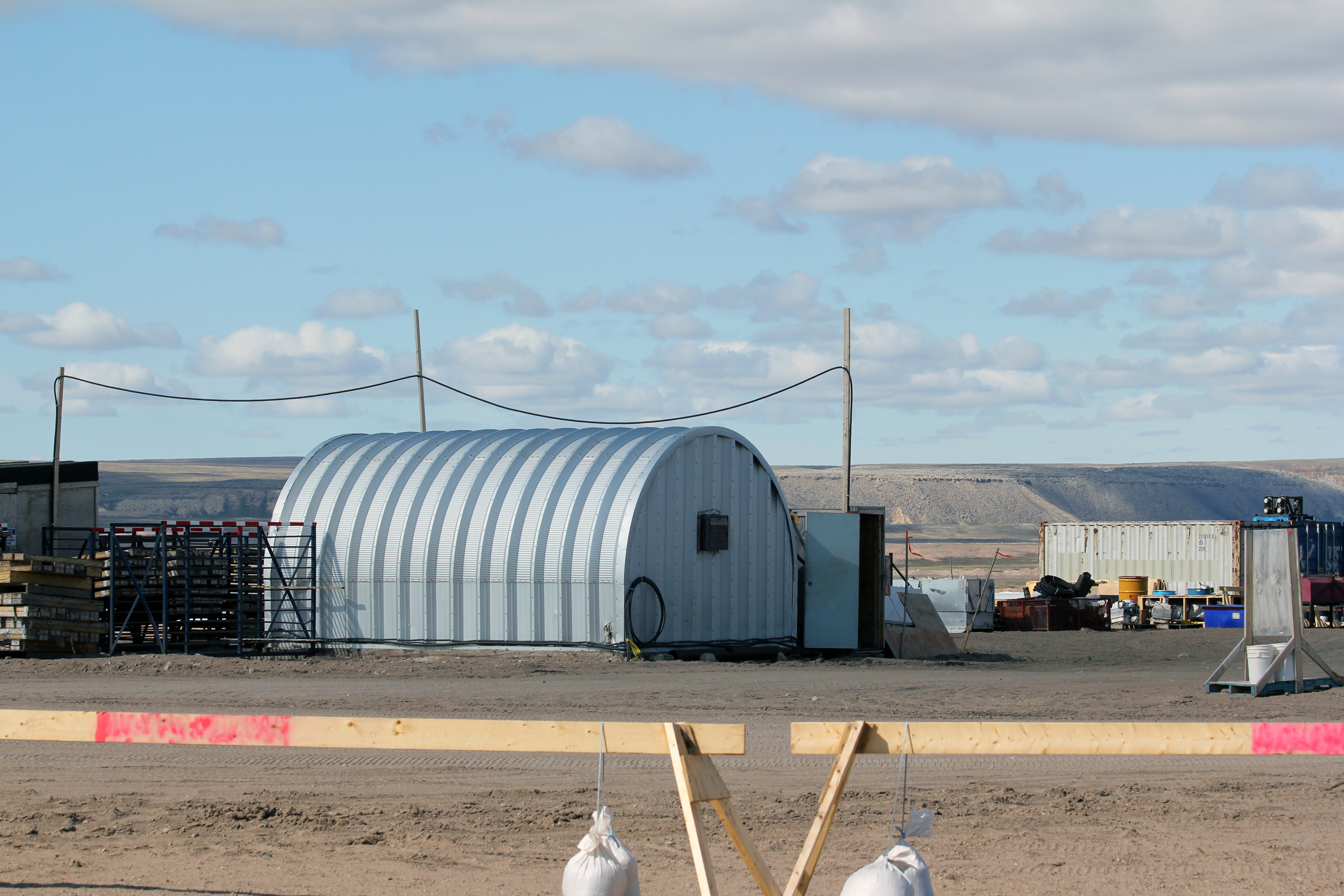
Mary River mine site

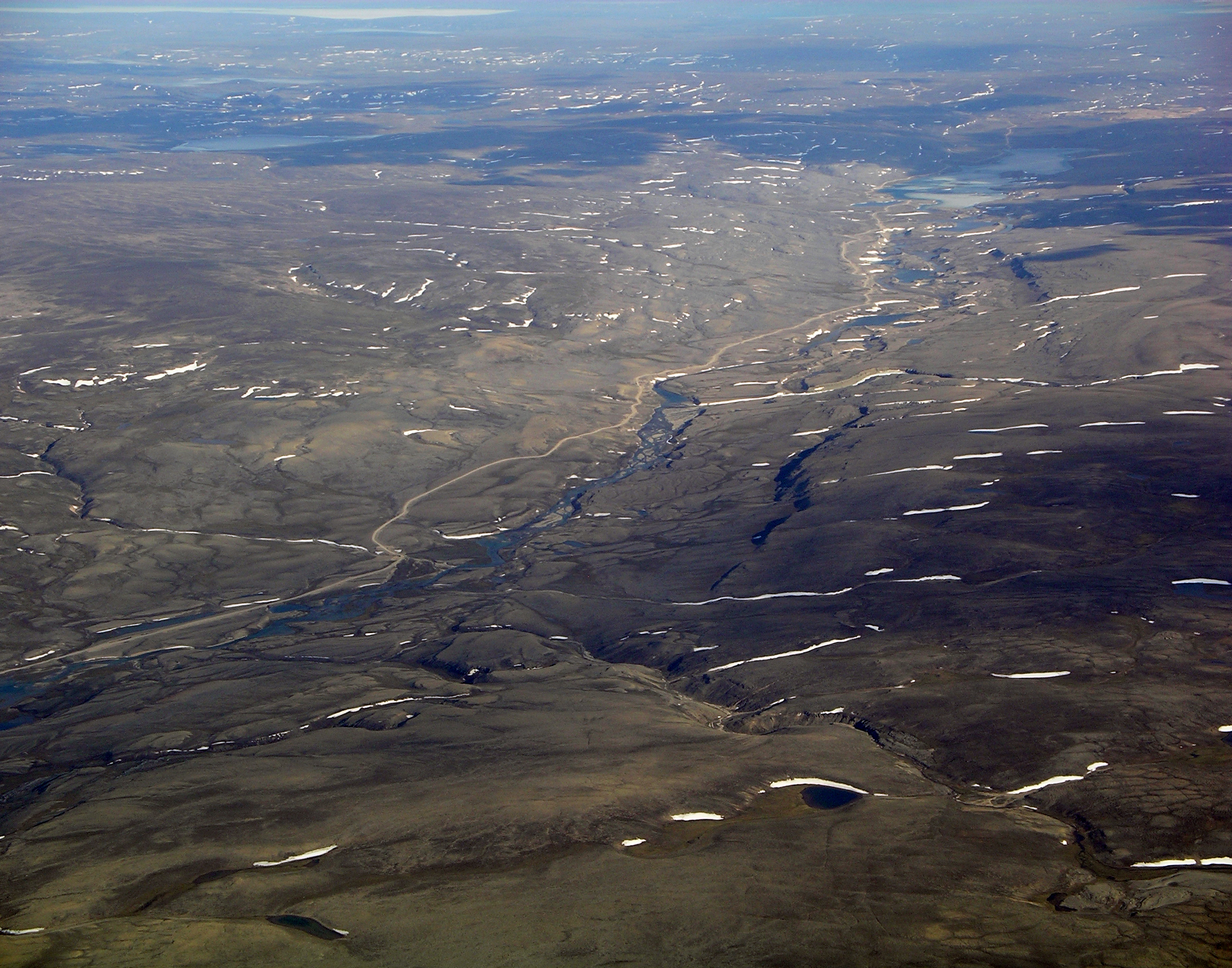
Road to Mary River

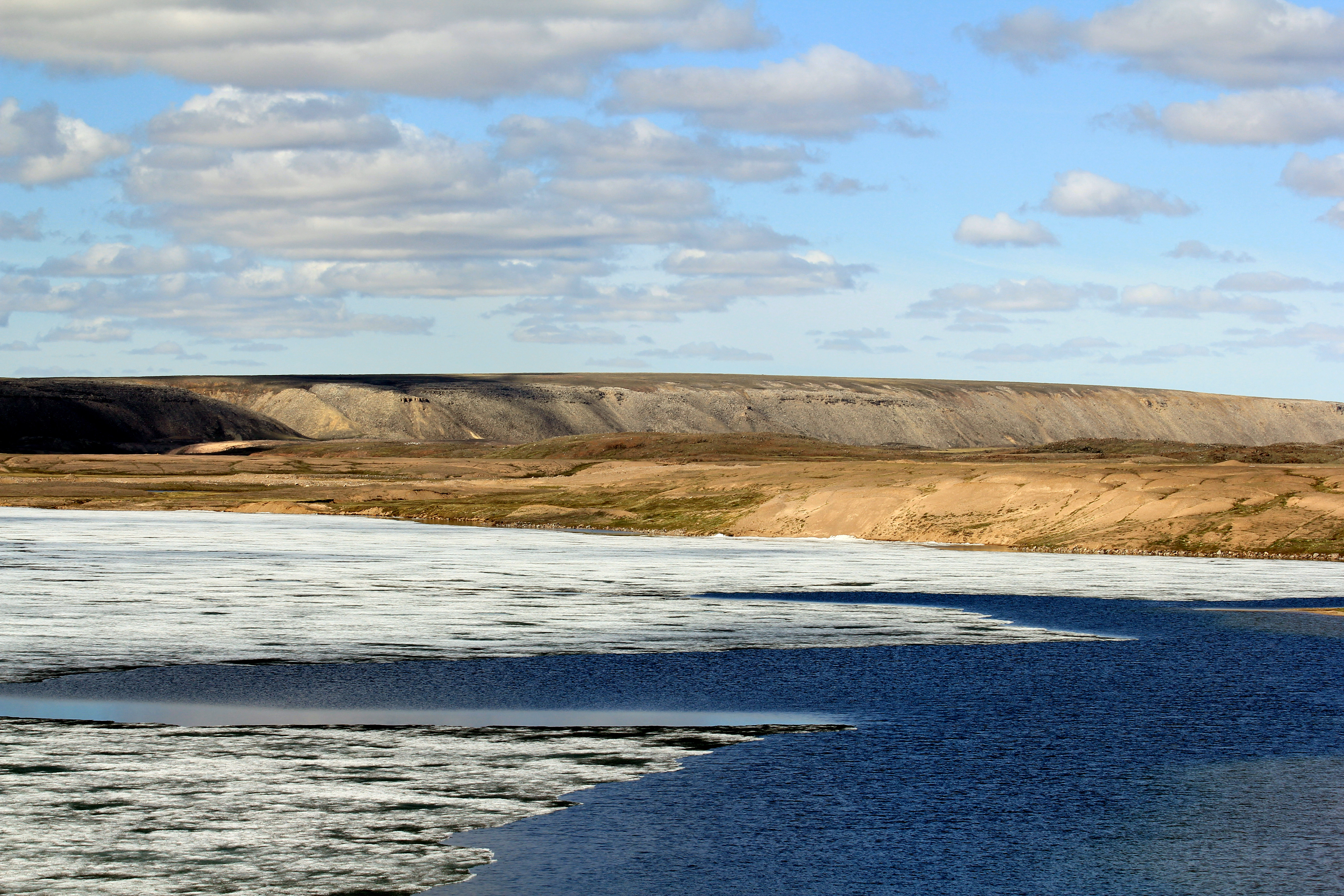
Fresh water lake at Mary River

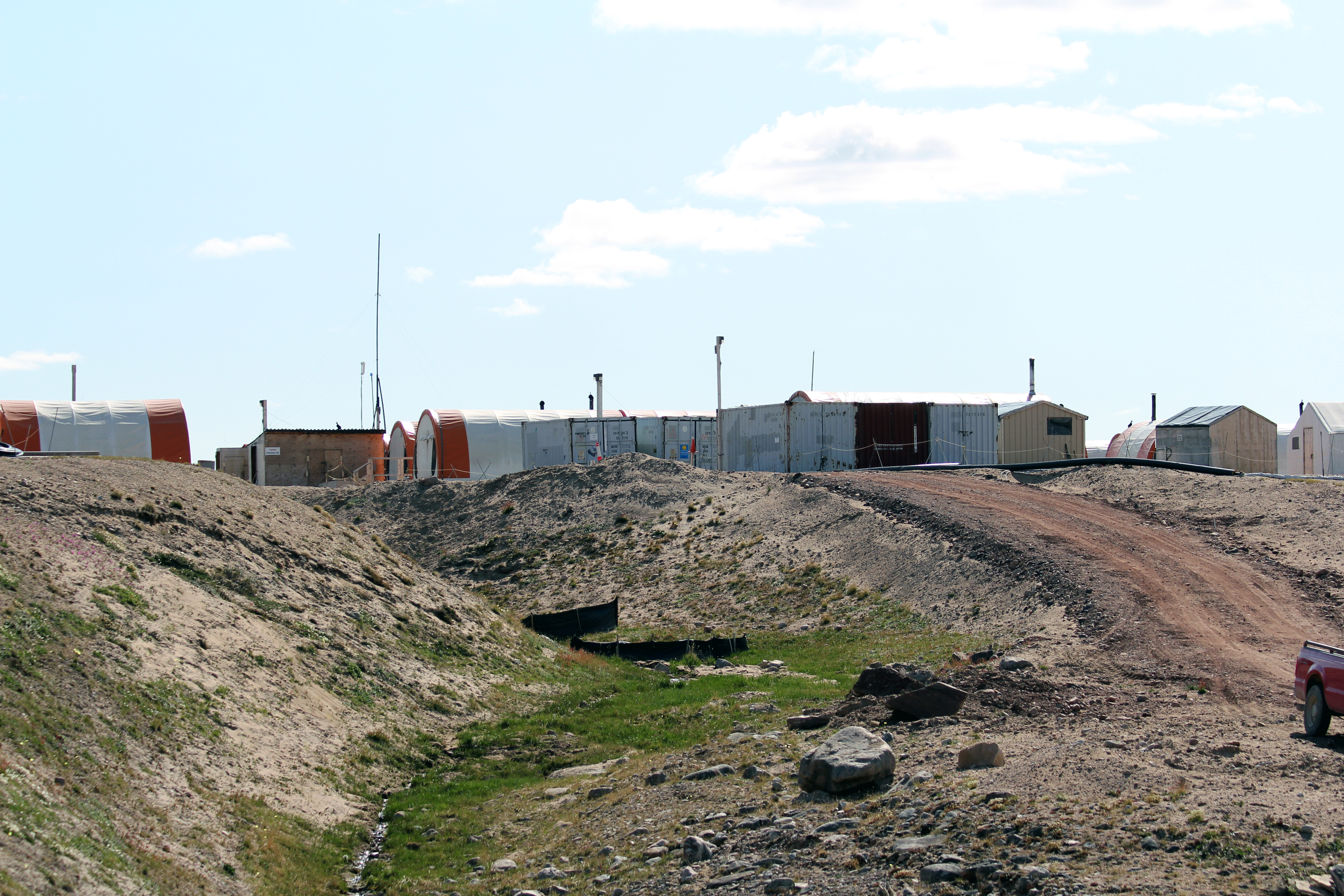
Mary River camp

== See also ==
- List of rivers of Nunavut
