= Anthony J. Naldrett =

English-Canadian geologist (1933–2020)

Anthony James "Tony" Naldrett, FRSC (1933 – 21 June 2020) was an English and Canadian geologist. He was an authority on the geology and origin of nickel-copper-platinum group element deposits, the tectonic setting in which they occur, the petrology of associated rocks, and controls on their composition. He was an expert on the reaction between sulfide and silicate melts, fractional crystallization of sulfide melts, and the role of hydrothermal fluids.

== Early life ==
Naldrett was born in England. Between 1951 and 1953, he was a pilot in the Royal Air Force.

In 1957, he obtained a degree in geology from the University of Cambridge. Later that year he moved to Canada, where he worked in Sudbury as a geologist for Falconbridge Nickel Mines. In 1959 he moved to Kingston, Ontario to attend Queen's University. He received an MSc (1961) and a PhD degree (1964) for his research on nickel deposits.

== Career ==
Naldrett took a position working in the Geophysical Laboratory of the Carnegie Institution of Washington. In 1967, he returned to Canada as an assistant professor at the University of Toronto. In 1972, he was appointed a full Professor, and University Professor in 1984. He worked there until his retirement in 1998. The university made him an Emeritus Professor.

Naldrett authored or co-authored 254 refereed publications, plus wrote or edited eight books covering his research in geology, mineralogy and chemistry of magmatic sulfide deposits and related rocks. His research covered most of the world's magmatic sulfide ores, including those at Sudbury, the Abitibi Belt, Voisey's Bay, the West Australian Widgiemooltha Komatiite deposits, the Zimbabwe Nickel deposits, deposits of the Raglan and Thompson belts, Norilsk, Pechenga, Jinchuan, the Duluth Complex, the Bushveld and Stillwater complexes, Zimbabwe's Great Dyke, and at the Lac des Îles igneous complex of northwestern Ontario.

In addition to his research, he consulted for over 35 companies including Chevron Corporation, Falconbridge, Western Mining Corporation, BHP, Rio Tinto, Cominco-American, Voisey's Bay Nickel, and Kennecott.

== Positions held ==
- 1982–1983, President of the Mineralogical Association of Canada
- 1991–1992, President of the Society of Economic Geologists
- 1998–2002, President of the International Mineralogical Association
- 2001–2002, President of the Geological Society of America
- 1987–1992, Chairman of the Board of the International Geological Correlation Programme
- 2005–2009, Visiting Professor at Royal Holloway, University of London
- 2005–2020; Honorary Professorship at the University of the Witwatersrand
- 2009–2020; Honorary Research Fellow, Natural History Museum, London

== Honours and awards ==
- 1974, awarded the Barlow Memorial Medal by the Canadian Institute of Mining and Metallurgy
- 1980, awarded the Duncan Derry Medal by the Geological Association of Canada
- 1982, awarded the Society Medal by the Society of Economic Geologists
- 1983, bestowed an Honorary Life Fellowship in the European Union of Geosciences
- 1984, elected to the Fellowship in the Royal Society of Canada
- 1986, awarded the Bownocker Gold Medal by Ohio State University
- 1991, awarded the Past-Presidents' Medal by the Mineralogical Association of Canada
- 1994, awarded the Logan Medal by the Geological Association of Canada
- 1999, bestowed an Honorary Life Fellowship in the Russian Mineralogical Society
- 2000, awarded the Wardell Armstrong Prize from the Institution of Mining and Metallurgy
- 2000, received D.Sc. (honoris causa) from Laurentian University
- 2001, received D.Sc. (honoris causa) from the University of Pretoria
- 2002, bestowed an Honorary Life Fellowship in the Mineralogical Society
- 2002, awarded the Penrose Gold Medal by the Society of Economic Geologists
- 2008, elected the 30th de Beers Alex du Toit Memorial Lecturer by the Geological Society of South Africa
- 2011, bestowed Honorary Life Fellow, Geological Society of South Africa
- 2012, awarded the Haddon Forrester King medal by the Australian Academy of Science
- 2013, creation of the Naldrett graduate scholarship, Department of Earth Sciences, University of Toronto

== Frequently cited publications ==
- 2004 Naldrett, A.J., Magmatic Sulfide Deposits: Geology, Geochemistry and Exploration, Springer Verlaag, 728 pp
- 2003 Naldrett, A.J., Magmatic Sulfide Deposits of Nickel-Copper and Platinum Metal Ores, ISBN 5-902260-02-7, St Petersburg University 400 pp (in Russian)
- 2001 Li, C., Naldrett, A.J. and Ripley, E.M., Critical factors for the formation of a Ni-Cu deposit: Lessons from a comparison of the Pants Lake and Voisey's Bay deposits, Labrador, Mineralium Deposita 36, 85–92.
- 2000 Li, Chusi and Naldrett, Anthony J., Melting reactions of gneissic inclusions with enclosing magma at Voisey's Bay: Implications with respect to ore genesis. Economic Geology, 95, 801-814

== See also ==
- Ore genesis
- Kambalda type komatiitic nickel ore deposits
