= An Antane-Kapesh =

Innu writer and activist (1926–2004)

- Born: 1926
- Died: 2004 (aged 77–78)
- Other name: Anne(-Marie) André
- Occupations: writer and activist

An Antane-Kapesh (1926–2004), also known by her French-language name Anne(-Marie) André, was an Innu writer and activist from Schefferville, Quebec. She was a chief at Schefferville (Matimekosh) from 1965–1967.

In 1976, she published the autobiographical book Je suis une maudite sauvagesse/Eukuan nin matshimanitu innu-iskueu ('I Am A Damned Savage Woman') in a bilingual French–Innu edition. This book, which deals with topics such as loss of hunting territory, the residential school system and police brutality, may have been the first French-language book published by a First Nations woman in Quebec. The publication of books such as this, containing Innu text, has also been cited as an important factor in the cultural revival of the language; an Innu-language press (Éditions Innu) was soon founded and existed until 1993.

Kapesh followed this book with another, Tanite nene etutamin nitassi? / Qu'as-tu fait de mon pays? ('What Have You Done With My Country?') in 1979, discusses colonization of Turtle Island from the perspective of a fictionalized child. In 1981, it was then adapted for stage production by Kapesh and Jose Maillot (who translated her first novel into French). Although her writings would be an inspiration to subsequent Innu writers, they were not well received at the time of publication. According to the publisher, Bernard Assiniwi, Je suis une maudite sauvagesse brought on a negative reaction from the reading public. In addition, subsequent planned volumes in the series were canceled.

A bilingual Innu-English translation of both works (English titles "I Am A Damn Savage" and "What Have You Done to My Country?") first appeared in 2020, translated by Sarah Henzi and published by Wilfrid Laurier University Press.

== See also ==
- Maria Campbell
- Harold Cardinal
