= Selwyn G. Blaylock =

Canadian geologist (1879–1945)

- Born: 18 February 1879; Paspébiac, Quebec
- Died: 19 November 1945 (aged 66); Trail, British Columbia
- Education: Bishop's College School ('95); McGill University (BSc 1899)
- Spouse(s): Ruperta Margaret Riddle (m. 1904; died 1917) Kathleen Louella Louise Riddle (m. 1918)

Selwyn Gwillym Blaylock (18 February 1879 – 19 November 1945) was a Canadian mining engineer who served from 1939 to 1945 as president of Cominco. He was President of the Canadian Institute of Mining, Metallurgy and Petroleum in 1934–35. For his work he was inducted into the Canadian Mining Hall of Fame.

== Early life ==
He was born in Paspébiac, Quebec. Blaylock attended Bishop's College School in Lennoxville, Quebec. In 1899, he obtained a B.Sc. from McGill University.

== Career ==
After graduating, he moved west and obtained work as a surveyor for the Canadian Smelting Works in Trail, British Columbia. Two years later, he became the company's chief chemist, but soon moved to Nelson, British Columbia to become general superintendent of the Hall Mines Smelter, then general superintendent of the St. Eugene mines. In 1908, Blaylock joined the Consolidated Mining and Smelting Company (Cominco). In 1919, he became Cominco's general manager. In 1922 a director, vice-president in 1927, managing director in 1938 and president in 1939.

Blaylock worked at the Cominco smelter until six months before he died in Trail in 1945. He was buried at Danville, Quebec.

== Honours ==
- inducted into the Canadian Mining Hall of Fame
- awarded the McCharles Prize from the University of Toronto for outstanding work in Canadian Metallurgy
- 1928, awarded the James Douglas Medal for Metallurgy by the American Institute of Mining and Metallurgy
- 1930, presented with an honorary degree by the University of Alberta
- 1935, awarded the Inco Medal by The Canadian Institute of Mining and Metallurgy for outstanding work in mining and smelting
- 1944, made an honorary member of the American Institute of Mining, Metallurgical, and Petroleum Engineers
- 1944, Gold Medal of the Institute of Mining and Metallurgy of Great Britain
- 1948, the Canadian Institute of Mining, Metallurgy and Petroleum established the Selwyn G. Blaylock Medal. It is presented annually to an individual that has demonstrated distinguished service to Canada through exceptional achievement in the field of mining, metallurgy, or geology
- 1961, Blaylock Creek was named in his honour

== See also ==
- Blaylock Estates
- Blaylock Creek
- Milestones of Canadian Chemistry
