= Richard Geren =

American geologist

Richard Geren

Richard Geren, OC (1917–2002), was an American geologist who was a key member of the team that defined high-grade iron ore deposits in the Knob Lake area of northeastern Quebec. The deposit's magnitude and significance led to the formation of the Iron Ore Company of Canada (IOCC) in 1949. Geren led pre-production studies and became Manager of IOCC's operations at Schefferville, where he faced numerous challenges associated with building a large mining operation in isolated sub-Arctic conditions.

Geren was born in Columbus, Ohio. His interest in mining originated in 1935 by a chance meeting with two geologists in northern Ontario. He earned his B.Sc. degree in geology from Ohio State University. Then he returned to Canada and started his career in the Timmins gold-mining area.

During the Second World War, he served in the Royal Canadian Air Force. Afterwards he was employed by the Labrador Mining and Exploration Company. He received a mandate to confirm iron ore deposits of sufficient size in Labrador and northeastern Quebec to justify building a mine and railroad. More than 400 million tonnes were proven in the Knob Lake area in Labrador, which led to the creation of the Iron Ore Company of Canada and the construction of the Quebec North Shore and Labrador Railway (QNS & L) and the Town of Schefferville. Geren became the supervising geologist and chief mining engineer and then Mine Superintendent from 1954 to 1961. In 1961, he became Assistant Manager of IOCC. He became an Executive Vice-President of IOCC in 1976, a position he held until his retirement.

During retirement, Geren and another former IOCC employee, Blake McCullogh, collaborated in writing a corporate history of the Iron Ore Company of Canada titled Cain's Legacy: The Building of Iron Ore Company of Canada (1990).

In 1983, Geren was awarded the Inco Medal by the Canadian Institute of Mining and Metallurgy (CIMM) in recognition of a "legacy of pioneering spirit and leadership that has helped the iron ore industry weather economic difficulties and rekindle hope to meet the challenge for survival."

In 1984, Geren was invested as Officer of the Order of Canada, Canada's highest civilian honour. In 2001, he was inducted into the Canadian Mining Hall of Fame.
