= LabMag mine =

- Location: Quebec, Canada
- Products: Iron ore

The LabMag mine is a proposed iron mine near Schefferville in northern Quebec, Canada. LabMag is one of the largest iron ore reserves in the world, having estimated reserves of 5.74 billion tonnes of ore grading 29.4% iron metal.

A feasibility study for the LabMag project by Tata Steel was commissioned by the Board, with results expected by early 2013.

== See also ==
- List of mines in Canada
