= Murray Edmund Watts =

Canadian mining engineer (1909–1982)

- Born: 1909; Cobalt, Ontario
- Died: October 8, 1982 (aged 72–73)
- Citizenship: Canadian
- Known for: Discovery of the Mary River iron ore deposit
- Awards: Order of Canada; Massey Medal

Murray Edmund Watts, CM (1909 – October 8, 1982) was a Canadian mining engineer and prospector. He is known for a series of important ore discoveries in the Arctic regions, beginning at the age of 22, and continuing through a long career.

== Biography ==
Watts was born in the silver town of Cobalt, Ontario in 1909.

== Mineral discoveries ==
He is credited with the following mineral discoveries:

- Raglan nickel deposits, Cape Smith belt, Ungava region (now Nunavik) of Quebec, Canada – a discovery made at the age of 22
- Asbestos Hill asbestos deposits, Ungava region of Quebec, Canada (once operated by Asbestos Corporation Limited)
- Mary River iron deposits, Baffin Island, Canada
- "47"-zone copper deposit, Coppermine River area, Northwest Territories, Canada

== Career ==
He was also known as a manager for mining companies. He was mine superintendent of Canadian Malartic Gold Mines and general manager of Little Long Lac Gold Mines (1948–56). In 1962, he founded the international geological and mining consulting firm, Watts, Griffis and McOuat Limited with co-founders Arthur Thomas Griffis and Jack McOuat.

== Awards ==
- Canadian Mining Hall of Fame Inductee (1989)
- Order of Canada
- Massey Medal of the Canadian Geographical Society.
