= Canadian Mining Hall of Fame =

Award for mining in Canada

The Canadian Mining Hall of Fame was conceived by Maurice Russell Brown as a way to honor Canada's mine finders and builders, in recognition of accomplishments by leaders in the Canadian mining industry.

The Hall was established in 1988; in 2023 it had 203 members.

== Locations ==
The Hall has five physical locations.

=== Toronto ===
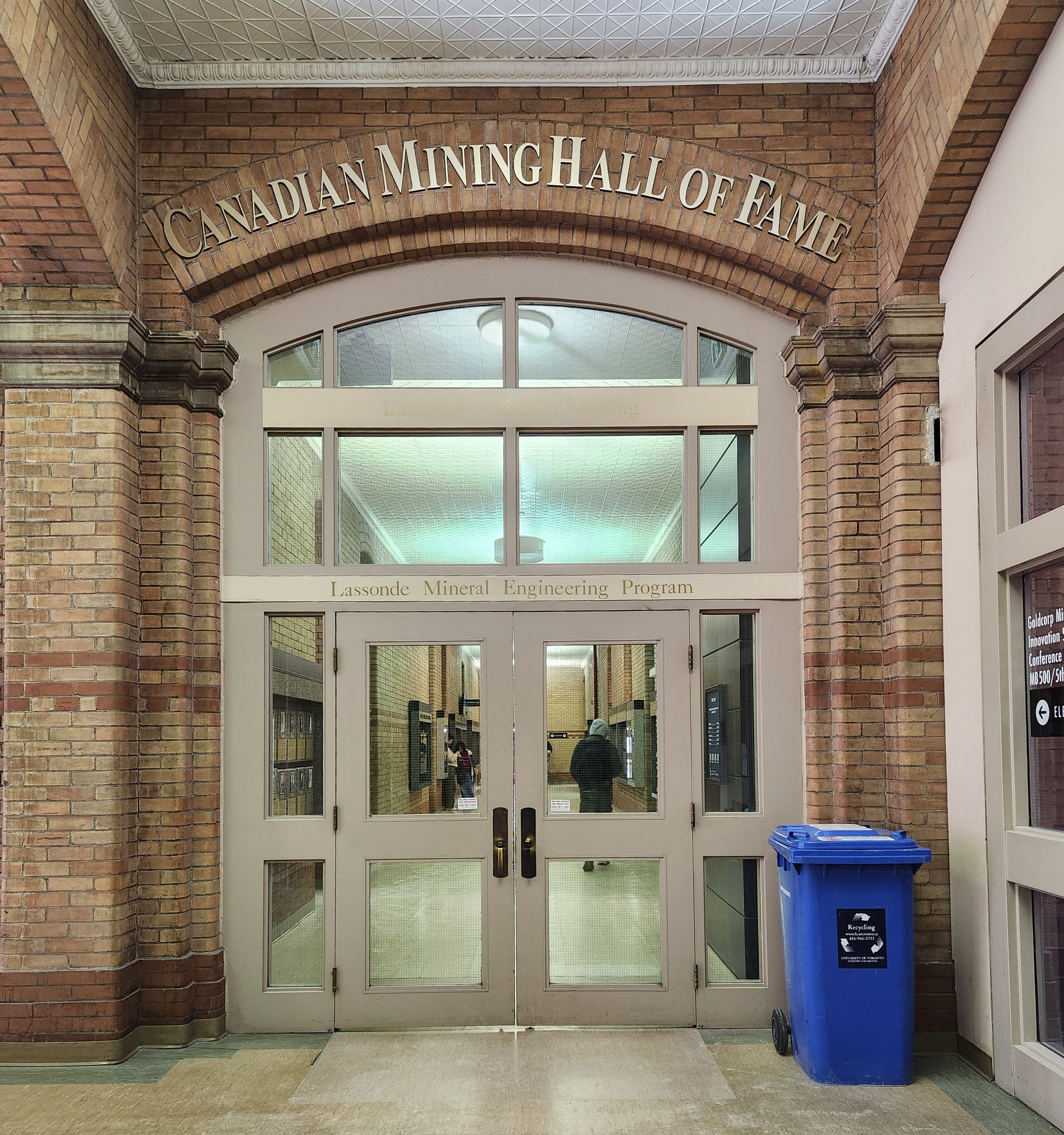
At the University of Toronto Lassonde Mining building

The University of Toronto hosts the original Hall on the ground floor of the historic Mining Building on its St. George campus. The Hall contains plaques of polished Canadian granite with photos and descriptions of the Members from 1989 to 2008.

The Royal Ontario Museum contains an interactive exhibit of the Hall on the second floor, within the Teck Suite of Galleries.

=== Elliot Lake ===
The Hall virtual exhibit is a part of the Mining Museum in the Lester B. Pearson Civic Centre in Elliot Lake.

=== Ottawa ===
The Hall's virtual exhibit opened in the Canadian Museum of Nature in 2012, as part of Phase 2 of the Vale Earth Gallery.

=== British Columbia ===
The Britannia Mine Museum, located at the site of the former Britannia copper mine also features the Hall's virtual exhibit.

== Nomination guidelines ==
The candidate must have demonstrated outstanding lifetime achievements to the benefit of the Canadian minerals industry in one or more categories of achievement. The individual should be retired and have reached the age of 65 years. Nominations of individuals may be made by individuals, firms or organizations through one of the Hall's Sponsors or Associates.

=== Categories of achievement ===
- Exploration
  - Discovered a large deposit or a large number of significant deposits
  - Introduced a new exploration technique
  - Overcoming of exceptional obstacles in discovering a significant deposit
- Building a corporation
- Technical contribution
  - Development of a technology or operation method that profoundly impacted the industry
  - Provision of geoscience data or scientific knowledge.
- Supporting contribution
  - External support for the industry through education, policy or communication
- Mining in society
  - Outstanding achievement in bridging the business goals of the industry with those of Canadian society

== Inductees ==
- Frederick R. Archibald
- P. Jerry Asp
- Hector Authier
- Alex G. Balogh
- Anthony R. Barringer
- Ross J. Beaty
- Pierre Beauchemin
- Archibald M. Bell
- Benjamin Taylor Bell
- David Ross Bell
- John Paris Bickell
- Selwyn G. Blaylock
- Stewart Lynn "Stu" Blusson
- Sean Boyd
- Robert W. Boyle
- Matthew James Boylen
- John Ross Bradfield
- Peter M.D. Bradshaw
- Carroll "Chuck" Brawner
- J. Keith Brimacombe
- William Guy Brissenden
- Eldon Brown
- Maurice Russell Brown
- Peter M. Brown
- Johannes "Joe" Brummer
- Bernard O. Brynelsen
- David G. Burchell
- Neil Campbell
- Côme Carbonneau
- George Carmack
- Kate Carmack
- James E.C. Carter
- Dawson "Tagish" Charlie
- Frederick Connell
- John Convey
- Jim Cooney
- Marsh A. Cooper
- F. Dale Corman
- Ernest "Ernie" Craig
- George B. Cross
- Walter Curlook
- Alexander Stewart Dadson
- Ernest J. Darragh
- Alexander John Davidson
- C. Stanley Davidson
- Nathanael V. Davis
- Duncan R. Derry
- Randolph Diamond
- Robert Dickinson
- Patricia Dillon (Note: Not to be confused with the American politician)
- A.O. Dufresne
- Hugo Dummett
- Georges H. Dumont
- David Elliott
- Richard J. Ennis
- Joseph Errington
- Graham Farquharson
- Charles E. Fipke
- James M. Franklin
- Horace Fraser
- Robert Friedland
- Robert A. Gannicott
- Neil George
- Richard Geren
- Louis Gignac
- James Edward Gill
- James W. (Jim) Gill
- Frank Giustra
- Ned Goodman
- James R. Gordon
- Dr. Donald "Digger" Gorman
- Gerald Grandey
- Bruce J. Grierson
- Arthur Thomas Griffis
- Oliver Hall
- Robert Hallbauer
- Phillip G. Hallof
- John Hammell
- John A. Hansuld
- James Merritt Harrison
- Gerald G. Hatch
- Herbert E.T. Haultain
- Tom Hebert
- Robert Henderson
- Joseph H. Hirshhorn
- Donald M. Hogarth
- Benny Hollinger
- Walter Holyk
- Edmund Horne
- H. H. "Spud" Huestis
- Robert "Bob" Hunter
- Richard W. Hutchinson
- Robert John Isaacs
- William Fleming James
- William (Bill) James
- Maureen C. Jensen
- William Gladstone Jewitt
- Franc Joubin
- Robert Jowsey
- Norman Bell Keevil
- Norman B. Keevil
- Roland Kenneth Kilborn
- Michael J. Knuckey
- Albert Koffman
- John Kostuik
- Alan Kulan
- Gilbert LaBine
- Adolphe La Prairie
- Fred La Rose
- A.M. (Sandy) Laird
- Pierre Lassonde
- Ross D. Lawrence
- Thayer Lindsley
- Sir William Logan
- Egil H. Lorntzsen
- Hans T. F. Lundberg
- Terry MacGibbon
- John MacIsaac
- Donald Roderick MacLean
- Phillip John Mackey
- Vladimir Nicolaus Mackiw
- Viola R. MacMillan
- Skookum Jim (Keish) Mason
- John Williams McBean
- James McCrea
- James J. McDougall
- Rob McEwen
- Sandy McIntyre (formerly Alexander Oliphant)
- James H. McKinley
- Donald A. McLeod
- Jack McOuat
- W. Austin McVeigh
- Brian K. G. Meikle
- Bernard M. Michel
- Charles E. Michener
- Chester F. Millar
- Alfred E. Miller
- Willet Green Miller
- R. G. K. Morrison
- Alex Mosher
- Peter Munk
- James Y. Murdoch
- Mike Muzylowski
- Ronald K. Netolitzky
- James Paul Norrie
- Sir Harry Oakes
- Stephen P. Ogryzlo
- James C. O'Rourke
- Ralph D. Parker
- Norman R. Paterson
- Norman C. Pearce and Richard Pearce
- Paul Penna
- Murray Pezim
- Franklin G.T. Pickard
- Lloyd Montgomery Pidgeon
- Richard Porritt
- Alfred Powis
- Robert Quartermain
- Mark Rebagliati
- Louis Renzoni
- Joseph Arlington Retty
- Kate Rice
- Peter Risby
- Walter J. Riva
- David S. Robertson
- Stephen Roman
- Harry L. Roscoe
- William E. Roscoe and John T. Postle
- William S. Row
- Eberhard (Ebe) Scherkus
- Edgar A. Scholz
- Seymour Schulich
- Stephen D. Scott
- Harold O. Seigel
- Patricia Ann Sheahan
- Roman Shklanka
- Douglas Balfour Silver
- John D. Simpson
- Robert M. Smith
- Franklin K. Spragins
- Karl Springer
- Eric Sprott
- Robert Crooks Stanley
- Arthur W. Stollery
- Ian Telfer
- D. Grenville Thomas
- James Edgar Thomson
- David A. Thompson
- Edward G. Thompson
- John Fairfield Thompson
- Jules Timmins
- Noah A. Timmins
- Joseph B. Tyrrell
- Mary Edith Tyrrell
- Mervyn Upham
- Steve Vaughn
- Ossian Walli
- Victor Wansbrough
- Harry Verney Warren
- Bert Wasmund
- Mackenzie Iles Watson
- Murray Edmund Watts
- Arthur W. White
- Harold "Hank" Williams
- John Williamson
- Jack Wilson
- John Tuzo Wilson
- Harold Wright
- William Henry Wright
- John Zigarlick, Jr.
