= Schefferville =

Schefferville ᓴᐸᐱᐤ
- Town
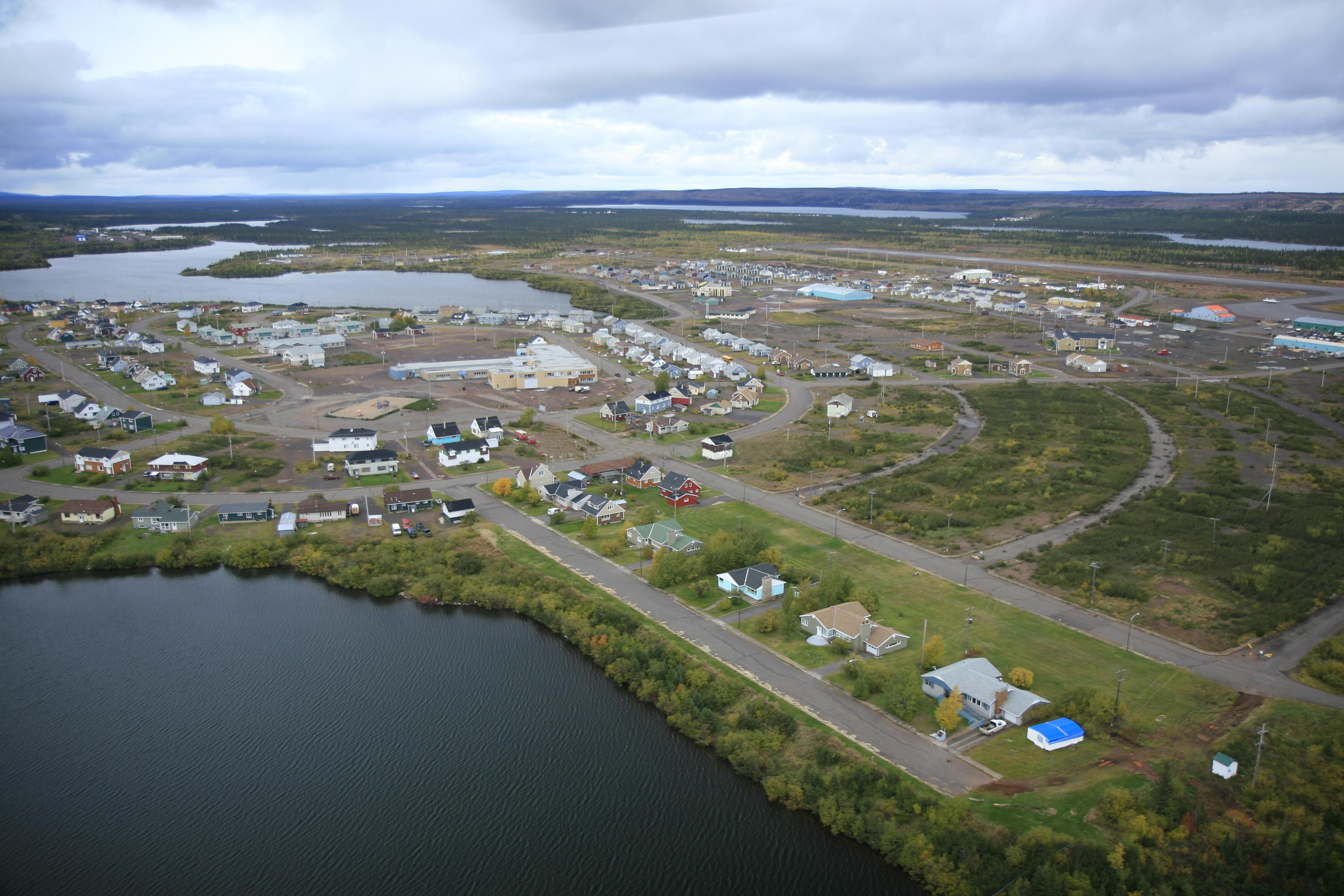

- Location in Côte-Nord Region of Quebec
- Coordinates: 54°48′N 66°50′W
- Country: Canada
- Province: Quebec
- Region: Côte-Nord
- RCM: Caniapiscau
- Settled: 1953
- Constituted: August 1, 1955
- Incorporated: 1990
- Named for: Lionel Scheffer

Government
  - Administrator: Jean Dionne
  - Federal riding: Côte-Nord—Kawawachikamach—Nitassinan
  - Prov. riding: Duplessis

Area
  - Total: 39.53 km^{2} (15.26 sq mi)
  - Land: 24.76 km^{2} (9.56 sq mi)

Population (2021)
  - Total: 244
  - Density: 9.9/km^{2} (26/sq mi)
  - Pop (2016–2021): ▲87.7%
  - Dwellings: 209
- Time zone: UTC−5 (EST)
  - Summer (DST): UTC−4 (EDT)
- Postal code(s): G0G 2T0
- Area codes: 418 and 581
- Highways: No major routes
- NTS map: 23J15 Lac Knob
- Website: www.ville-schefferville.ca

Schefferville (French pronunciation: [ʃɛfœʁvil]| Naskapi: ᓴᐸᐱᐤ, romanized: Saapaapiiw) is a town in the Canadian province of Quebec. Schefferville is in the heart of the Naskapi and Innu territory in northern Quebec, less than 2 km (1¼ miles) from the border with Labrador on the north shore of Knob Lake. It is located within the Caniapiscau Regional County Municipality and has an area of 24.76 square kilometres (9.56 sq mi). Schefferville completely surrounds the autonomous Innu community of Matimekosh, and it abuts the small community of Lac-John Reserve. Both of the latter communities are First Nations Innu reserves. Schefferville is also close to the Naskapi reserved land of Kawawachikamach.

The isolated town is not connected to the provincial road network but is accessible by airplane via the Schefferville Airport or by train. Schefferville is the northern terminus of Tshiuetin Rail Transportation (formerly operated by the Quebec North Shore and Labrador Railway) with service to Sept-Îles.

McGill University operates the McGill Subarctic Research Station in Schefferville.

== History ==
Schefferville was established as a company town in 1954 by the Iron Ore Company Of Canada to support the mining of rich iron ore deposits in the area. The original settlement was called "Burnt Creek" and was located some miles to the north of the current location of the town of Schefferville. When the plans were drawn up for the town, it was originally called "Knob Lake", after a prominent iron ore outcrop visible on a prominent hill south of the town site. The name Schefferville was adopted in honour of (Roman Catholic) Bishop Lionel Scheffer, who served as the Apostolic Vicar of Labrador from 14 March 1946, until his death on 3 October 1966.

At the time of the town's founding, Innu from Maliotenam and Naskapi from Fort Chimo were resettled to Schefferville to assist with geological exploration work and the railway construction. Following many years of neglect, in which they suffered destitute poverty, in 1968 parts of the town were set aside for them as a reserve. By 1972, housing units had been built. Most of the Naskapi and Innu moved to this new site, known today as Matimekosh Reserve.

For some years in the late 1950s, NORAD operated a radar station near Schefferville as part of the Mid-Canada Line, part of North America's defences against possible Soviet attack across the arctic. At its peak in the late 1960s, Schefferville counted some 5,000 residents.

With a mean annual air temperature of −5.3 °C (22.5 °F), Schefferville belongs to a zone with widespread permafrost occurrence and permafrost exists with a considerable thickness in the area. This resulted in difficulties when blasting in the open pit mine.

Iron ore mining ceased in Schefferville in 1982 on orders from Brian Mulroney, president of the Iron Ore Company. He later became Prime Minister of Canada. When mine operations ceased, most of the 4,000 or so non-aboriginal occupants left. The remainder were mostly aboriginal people who had settled there in the preceding 30 years.

In 1986, the town ceased to exist and dissolved as an incorporated legal entity; the town was incorporated again in 1990. Some houses and public facilities were demolished, while other parts of the infrastructure were added to the Matimekosh Reserve. Many of the remaining houses in the town are used as company housing by businesses active in the iron industry.

== Geography ==
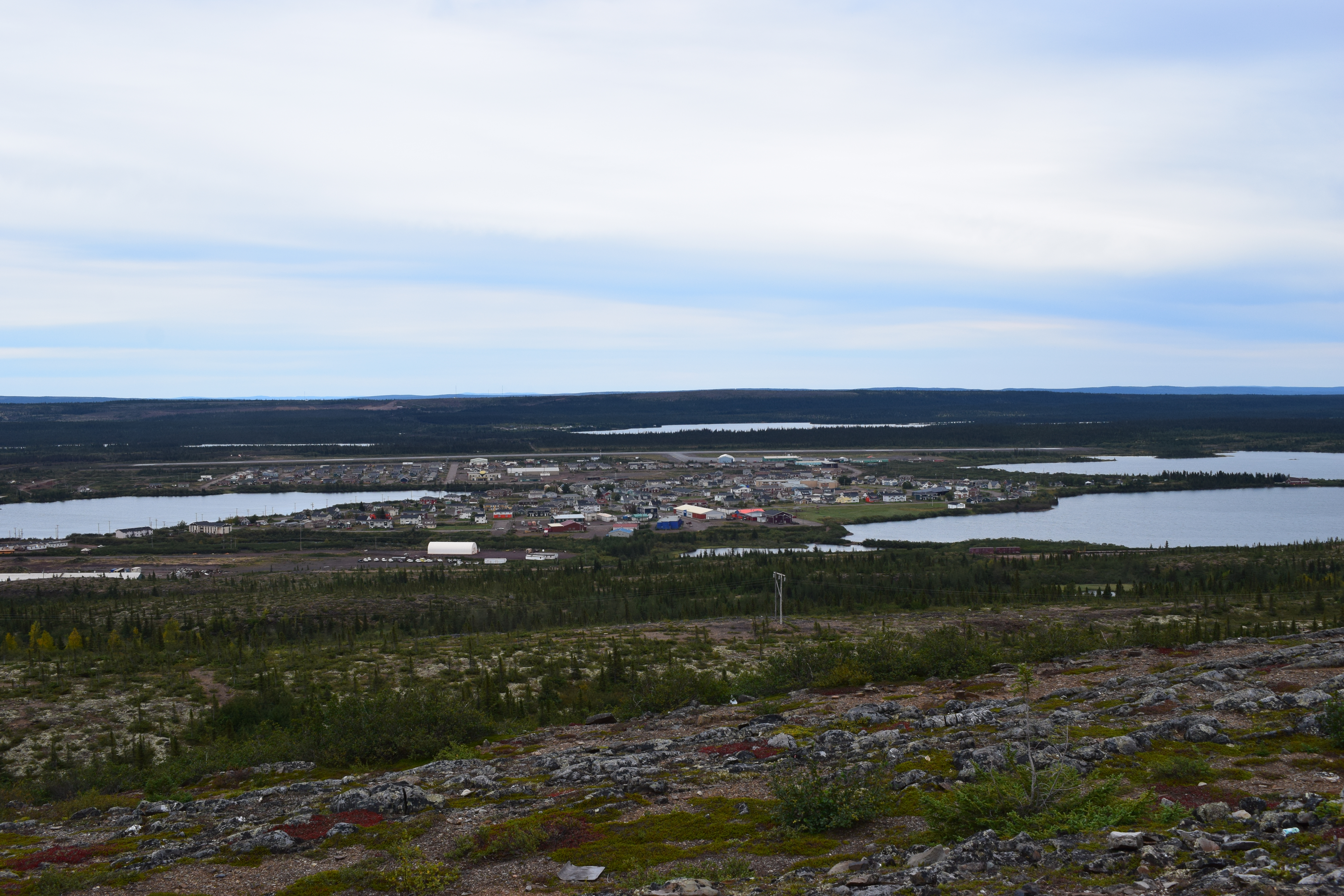
Schefferville

One of the two only municipalities (with Fermont) on the territory of the Caniapiscau RCM, Schefferville owes its existence to mining. Located in the heart of the Labrador Peninsula, between Knob and Dauriat lakes, 200 km (125 miles) from Labrador City and 533 km (331 miles) north of Sept-Îles, to which it is still connected by the railway.

=== Climate ===
Schefferville has a subarctic climate (Köppen Dfc). Schefferville has cool summers relative to its latitude and inland location.

The cold winters are caused in part by elevation, and in part the ice cover of Hudson Bay eliminating maritime moderation in winter. Although Schefferville is nearer the Atlantic, the cold Labrador Current brings cold air also from the east. In summer, the Hudson Bay water is cold after just thawing, and the Labrador waters remains cool and prone to low-pressure systems under the Icelandic Low. As a result, even the vast landmass seldom builds up heat and remains extremely chilly for the latitude. Areas on similar or higher latitudes in western Canada are much warmer also in this time of the year as a result. The low mean annual air temperature of -5.3 °C (22.5 °F) indicates widespread occurrences of permafrost.

Climate data for Schefferville Airport (1981−2010 normals); elevation 522m
Month	Jan	Feb	Mar	Apr	May	Jun	Jul	Aug	Sep	Oct	Nov	Dec	Year
Record high °C (°F)	5.1 (41.2)	5.1 (41.2)	9.4 (48.9)	16.7 (62.1)	28.3 (82.9)	34.3 (93.7)	31.9 (89.4)	28.7 (83.7)	26.7 (80.1)	20.6 (69.1)	9.8 (49.6)	5.0 (41.0)	34.3 (93.7)
Mean daily maximum °C (°F)	−19.2 (−2.6)	−17.0 (1.4)	−9.7 (14.5)	−1.0 (30.2)	5.9 (42.6)	13.4 (56.1)	17.1 (62.8)	16.1 (61.0)	9.6 (49.3)	1.6 (34.9)	−6.0 (21.2)	−15.7 (3.7)	−0.4 (31.3)
Daily mean °C (°F)	−24.5 (−12.1)	−22.8 (−9.0)	−15.9 (3.4)	−7.2 (19.0)	1.0 (33.8)	8.2 (46.8)	12.2 (54.0)	11.4 (52.5)	5.9 (42.6)	−1.4 (29.5)	−9.8 (14.4)	−20.5 (−4.9)	−5.3 (22.5)
Mean daily minimum °C (°F)	−29.8 (−21.6)	−28.5 (−19.3)	−22.2 (−8.0)	−13.3 (8.1)	−4.0 (24.8)	3.0 (37.4)	7.3 (45.1)	6.6 (43.9)	2.3 (36.1)	−4.3 (24.3)	−13.5 (7.7)	−25.3 (−13.5)	−10.2 (13.6)
Record low °C (°F)	−48.3 (−54.9)	−50.6 (−59.1)	−45.0 (−49.0)	−40.4 (−40.7)	−23.3 (−9.9)	−7.8 (18.0)	0.0 (32.0)	−3.3 (26.1)	−9.4 (15.1)	−19.4 (−2.9)	−35.6 (−32.1)	−47.2 (−53.0)	−50.6 (−59.1)
Average precipitation mm (inches)	49.7 (1.96)	29.7 (1.17)	49.8 (1.96)	56.4 (2.22)	50.3 (1.98)	76.6 (3.02)	96.2 (3.79)	82.5 (3.25)	114.6 (4.51)	74.7 (2.94)	63.5 (2.50)	48.1 (1.89)	792.1 (31.19)
Average rainfall mm (inches)	0.26 (0.01)	0.29 (0.01)	1.4 (0.06)	9.0 (0.35)	26.1 (1.03)	69.2 (2.72)	96.1 (3.78)	81.9 (3.22)	103.0 (4.06)	24.5 (0.96)	4.5 (0.18)	0.73 (0.03)	416.98 (16.41)
Average snowfall cm (inches)	70.6 (27.8)	60.6 (23.9)	66.6 (26.2)	50.5 (19.9)	22.4 (8.8)	6.0 (2.4)	0.1 (0.0)	0.3 (0.1)	11.1 (4.4)	55.2 (21.7)	66.6 (26.2)	76.6 (30.2)	486.6 (191.6)
Average precipitation days (≥ 0.2 mm)	16.5	13.8	16.5	15.7	16.0	17.1	18.9	17.8	21.4	21.7	20.8	19.1	215.2
Average rainy days (≥ 0.2 mm)	0.15	0.54	0.85	3.3	8.8	15.4	18.9	17.8	19.0	7.6	2.3	0.58	95.1
Average snowy days (≥ 0.2 cm)	16.6	13.6	17.0	13.9	10.6	4.2	0.23	0.25	5.9	18.4	20.8	19.1	140.7
Mean monthly sunshine hours	86.2	122.3	153.2	185.2	199.8	185.4	196.9	177.4	90.5	61.3	49.6	58.9	1,566.6
Percentage possible sunshine	35.3	44.8	41.8	43.9	40.1	35.9	38.0	38.3	23.6	18.8	19.5	25.9	33.8
Source: Environment Canada

== Demographics ==
In the 2021 Census of Population conducted by Statistics Canada, Schefferville had a population of 244 living in 127 of its 209 total private dwellings, a change of 87.7% from its 2016 population of 130. With a land area of 24.76 km^{2} (9.56 sq mi), it had a population density of 9.9/km^{2} (25.5/sq mi) in 2021.

Many Naskapi first nation people live mostly in the village of Kawawachikamach, northwest of Schefferville. They are mostly Anglican and United Protestant and speak English as their second language. The Innu people reside mainly in Schefferville and Matimekosh. They are largely Roman Catholic and speak French as their second language.

Canada census – Schefferville community profile

	2021	2016	2011
Population	244 (+87.7% from 2016)	130 (-39.0% from 2011)	213 (+5.4% from 2006)
Land area	24.76 km^{2} (9.56 sq mi)	27.33 km^{2} (10.55 sq mi)	25.11 km^{2} (9.70 sq mi)
Population density	9.9/km^{2} (26/sq mi)	5.7/km^{2} (15/sq mi)	8.5/km^{2} (22/sq mi)
Median age	37.6 (M: 43.2, F: 29.6)	33.5 (M: 44.0, F: 29.2)	32.5 (M: 43.0, F: 28.2)
Private dwellings	209 (total) 127 (occupied)	230 (total) 76 (occupied)	178 (total) 110 (occupied)
Median household income	$.n/a	$.n/a	$.n/a

Notes: 2016 Population figure based on revised count.
References: 2021 2016 2011

Historical census populations – Schefferville

Year	Pop.	±%
1956	1,632	—
1961	3,178	+94.7%
1966	3,086	−2.9%
1971	3,271	+6.0%
1976	3,429	+4.8%
1981	1,997	−41.8%
1986	322	−83.9%

Year	Pop.	±%
1991	303	−5.9%
1996	578	+90.8%
2001	240	−58.5%
2006	202	−15.8%
2011	213	+5.4%
2016	130	−39.0%
2021	244	+87.7%

Population figures based on revised counts. Population counts are not adjusted for boundary changes.
Source: Statistics Canada

=== Languages ===
The Naskapi and Montagnais/Innu languages are, generally, mutually intelligible. Most local inhabitants are able to speak varying amounts of all the local languages, and code-switching is common in conversation.

The breakdown of mother tongues is (2021):

- English as first language: 12.2%
- French as first language: 42.9%
- English and French as first language: 0%
- Other as first language: 36.7%

== Economy ==
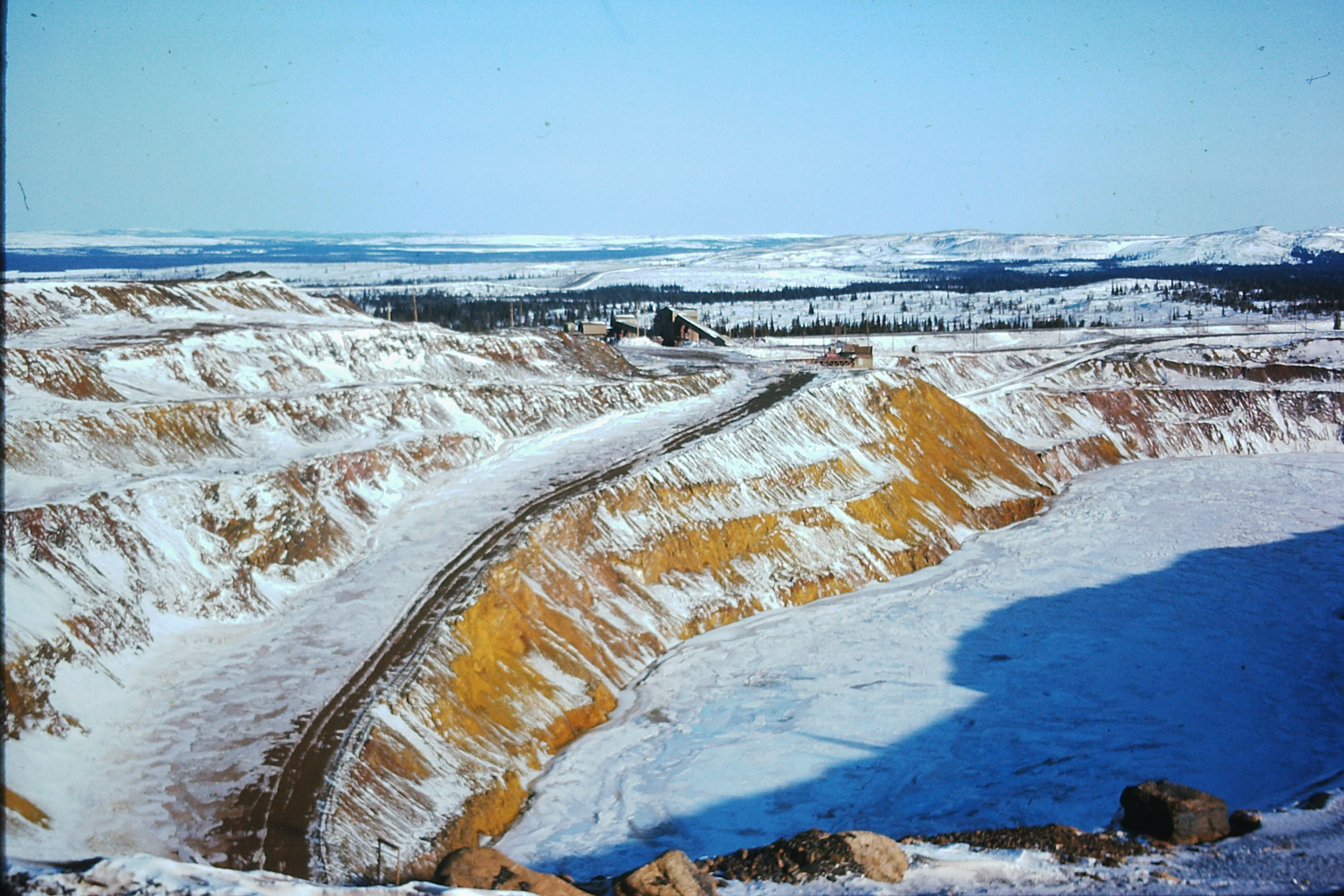
Schefferville open pit mining at Burnt Creek Pit in February 1976

As a result of increased demand for steel and iron ore, two official projects are underway in the early 21st century to re-establish mining operations out of Schefferville.

=== LabMag mine ===
The first is the LabMag Iron Ore Project, 30 kilometres (18 miles) west of Schefferville. The objective is to develop mining and concentrating near Schefferville that will mine 33 million tonnes of crude iron ore per year, in order to produce 10 million tonnes per year of concentrate and pellets for a minimum of 20 years. Mining production began in 2011. The Naskapi Nation of Kawawachikamach owns 20% of the LabMag Iron Ore Project.

=== Anglesey Mining ===
In addition, Anglesey Mining had applied for final operational permits on its former Iron Ore Company of Canada deposits. Production was scheduled to start during late summer 2010, with output rising to two or three million tons of ore a year by 2012 before further deposits are developed. Innu protesters blocked access to Schefferville in July 2010. They delayed the start of mining with demands for increased compensation for the commercial exploitation of their traditional homelands.

== Notable people ==
- Michèle Audette, of Innu and French-Canadian ancestry, grew up near here. She became an activist for First Nations rights, serving as president of Femmes autochtones du Québec (Quebec Native Women) and the Native Women's Association of Canada. She also served as an Associate Deputy Minister in the Quebec provincial government from 2004 through 2008.
- Richard Geren (1917–2002), American geologist
- Claude McKenzie (born 1967), Canadian singer-songwriter
- An Antane-Kapesh (1926–2004), Innu writer and activist

== See also ==
- List of anglophone communities in Quebec
- Mary River Mine
