= Charles Kenneth Leith =

American geologist

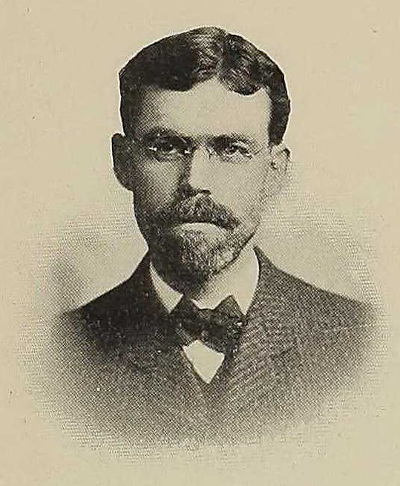
Charles Kenneth Leith, circa 1904

Charles Kenneth Leith (January 20, 1875 – September 13, 1956) was an American geologist. He was head of the University of Wisconsin geology department for 30 years. In 1942, he was awarded the Penrose Medal by the Geological Society of America, the highest award given in the geosciences.

== Biography ==
Leith was born in Trempealeau (village), Wisconsin. He was hired by Charles R. Van Hise as a stenographer in 1892 to work on his publications, and was so taken by the work that he completed a bachelor's degree in geology at the University of Wisconsin in 1897 and a Ph.D. in 1901. In 1903, when Van Hise became president of the University of Wisconsin, he hired Leith as head of the geology department at the age of 28. Leith served as chair until 1934 (31 years), and remained with the department until he retired in 1945. He also lectured on structural and metamorphic geology at the University of Chicago beginning in 1905.

During a 1909 expedition in the Hudson Bay area, Leith and his brother Arthur were feared lost after departing from Moose Factory. However, Leith later telegraphed his safe arrival in Cochrane, Ontario. Leith's early research focused on the geology of the Lake Superior region, including the ore deposits of the Mesabi range. He served as a consultant for the location and valuation of ore deposits for several mining companies and served as mineral adviser to the U.S. Shipping Board and the War Industries Board during World War I. He organized studies of world mineral supplies in the 1920s and served on many government agencies, including the Atomic Energy Commission, through the 1950s.

Leith was elected to the American Academy of Arts and Sciences in 1916, the United States National Academy of Sciences in 1920, and the American Philosophical Society in 1926.

Leith served as president of the Geological Society of America in 1933.

Leith won the Penrose Gold Medal of the Society of Economic Geologists in 1935. In June 1956 he received an honorary doctor of laws degree from the University of Wisconsin.

Leith died at his home in Madison in 1956.

== Works ==
- Rock Cleavage (1905)
- A Summer and Winter on Hudson Bay (1912)
- Structural Geology (1913)
- Metamorphic Geology (1915)
- The Economic Aspect of Geology (1921)
- The Political Control of Mineral Resources (1925)
- World Minerals and World Politics : A Factual Study of Minerals in Their Political and International Relations (New York: Whittlesey House, 1931).
- World Minerals and World Peace (Washington, D.C.: The Brookings Institution, 1943).

== See also ==
- Iron ore
