= Maurice Browne (disambiguation) =

Maurice Browne (1881–1955) was an English-American theater producer.

Maurice Browne may also refer to:

- Maurice Browne (author) (1892–1979), Irish author and priest who wrote as Joseph Brady
- Maurice Browne (cricketer) (1913–1980), New Zealand cricketer

== See also ==
- Maurice Brown (disambiguation)
