= Noranda Mines =

Canadian mining company (1922–2005)

Noranda Inc.
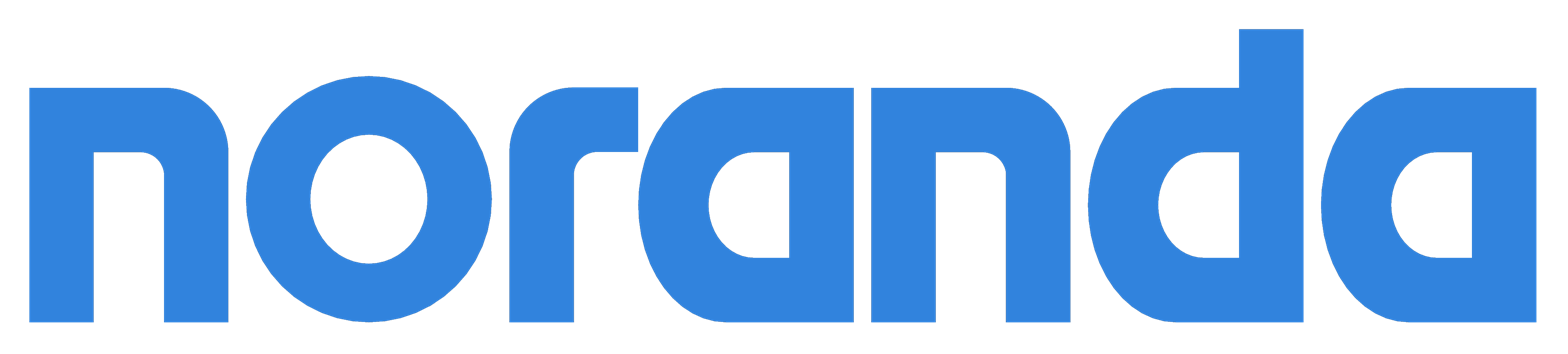
- Type: Public
- Industry: Mining
- Founded: 16 May 1922
- Defunct: 30 June 2005
- Fate: Acquired by Falconbridge
- Headquarters: Toronto, Ontario
- Products: Copper, gold, zinc, aluminum

Noranda Mines, Limited, and from 1984 onwards Noranda Inc., was a Canadian mining company that existed from 1922 to 2005. It was listed on the TSX under the symbol NRD.LV. After eventually acquiring a large interest in rival mining company Falconbridge, it merged with that company in 2005. The combined company continued under the name Falconbridge Limited, ending the Noranda name. Only one year later in 2006 Falconbridge was acquired by the Swiss-based mining company Xstrata. On 2 May 2013 ownership of Xstrata was fully acquired by mining behemoth Glencore.

== History and operations ==
Noranda was incorporated in 1922 as Noranda Mines under the leadership of James Y. Murdoch to exploit the Horne deposit, discovered by Edmond Henry Horne on mineral claims he staked in 1920 near Rouyn-Noranda, Quebec. Extraction of copper began on 17 December 1927. Although extraction was originally predicted to last for only three years, additional reserves (the gigantic "Giant H Orebody") were quickly discovered; the mine would form the backbone of Noranda's operations until reserves were exhausted in 1976.

Beginning in 1930, Noranda diversified by acquiring holdings in the forestry, oil, manufacturing, and automotive industries. In 1931, the company opened the CCR refinery in Montréal-Est, which processes all the copper produced by the Horne Smelter.

Noranda gained its first international property in 1938 with the purchase of the Empresa Minera de Nicaragua gold mine in Nicaragua.

The company gained a large interest in Kerr Addison Gold Mines in 1945.

In 1955 it opened the Gaspé Copper Mines, and in 1963 Canadian Electrolytic Zinc (CEZ), in which Noranda held a large stake, began production.

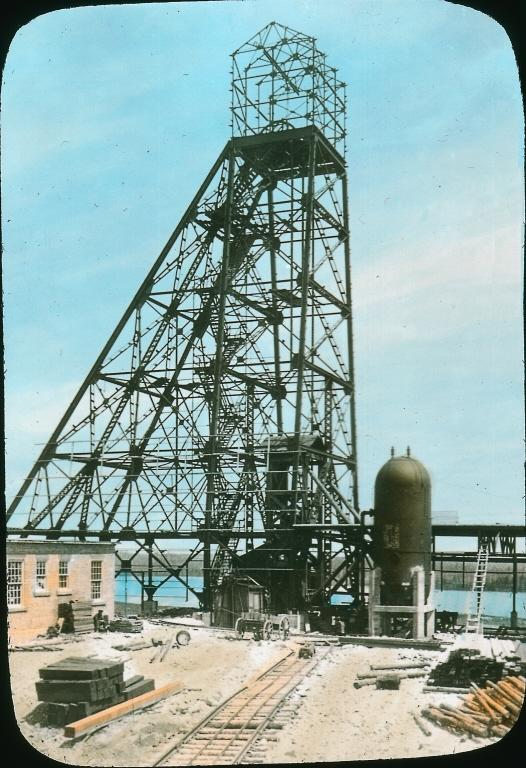
Main shaft headframe, Horne mine, Noranda, Quebec circa 1926.

In 1967, Noranda divested itself at $80 per share of its holdings in Denison Mines, which it had purchased in 1964 for $12 to $18 per share. A sum of $80mn was devoted to Potash mines in Saskatchewan, while $50mn purchased a 51% stake in the Brunswick Mining and Smelting Corporation earlier that year, as well as an investment in Pacific Coast Company, an aluminum products manufacturer based in Cleveland, Ohio.

Following the 1973 Chilean coup d'état, Noranda reclaimed its 49% share in its subsidiary Chile Canadian Mines. The company then invested $600,000 of new capital in its Chilean mines, the first major mining investment after the coup, securing the right to the Andacollo copper reserves in northern Chile in 1976. The year 1973 also saw the company expand into aluminum with the opening of an aluminum smelter in New Madrid, Missouri, and the oil business with the formation of Canadian Hunter.

Asset management companies Brascan and Caisse de Dépôt gained effective control of Noranda with a $1 billion CAD investment in 1981.

In 1984 Noranda Mines changed its name to Noranda Inc., as a reflection of its wide diversification. Also in 1984, the company became a large player in the electronics scrap and recycling business by purchasing Micro Metallics Corp.

In 1995 Noranda gained full control of Brunswick Mining and Smelting, a zinc mine and smelting company in New Brunswick; they opened a battery recycling facility one year later. Also in 1995 Noranda entered Latin America with the purchase of a 25% stake in the Refimet smelter outside of Antofagasta, Chile. Noranda obtained 100% control in 1998 and ownership of that site aided later expansion into Latin America.

Noranda announced that it would divest itself from all industries unrelated to mining and metals in 1997, and completed the transition the following year, removing itself from the forestry and oil and gas industries.

In August 2000, Noranda was the top miner in Canada.

The company gained a 34% stake in the huge Antamina copper-zinc mine in Peru, which opened in 2001.

In 2002 Noranda opened a large aluminum foil plant in Tennessee.

It expanded its recycling business with the opening of an electronic hardware recycling facility in Brampton, Ontario in 2003. Also in 2003 Noranda shelved its Alumysa project which sought to build an aluminium smelter and three hydroelectric power plants next to Aisén Fjord in Patagonia.

Noranda expanded its aluminum business in 2004 by gaining a 50% interest in the Gramercy alumina refinery in Louisiana and associated Jamaican bauxite deposits.

By 2005, the company had operations in 18 countries.

=== Two mergers ===
Noranda had bought 19.9% of rival mining company Falconbridge in 1988, which was raised to a 58.4% stake in 2002.

In 2004 China Minmetals was interested in buying Noranda, and completed negotiations with the Noranda board in October 2004 with a sale price of $6.7 billion, which caused the Canadian federal government to review its foreign investment policy. Bruce Flatt and Brascan favoured the Chinese offer.

Frustrated by the Canadian government, Noranda proposed a merger with Falconbridge in January 2005. In June 2005 Noranda and Falconbridge completed their merger, with Noranda essentially purchasing Falconbridge outright. However, the combined company continued under the name Falconbridge Limited, ending the Noranda name as a large mining company. Brascan saw its stake in the new company reduced to 20%, and in August 2005 they sold their share to Xstrata.

Less than a year after completing its merger with Falconbridge, the new company was fully acquired by Xstrata. The Noranda name continues for companies with Noranda Aluminum, which was the spun off by Xstrata, and the Noranda Income Fund which is a large zinc refinery in Salaberry-de-Valleyfield, Quebec.

== Scotland and Wales ==
Noranda Mines also operated in the UK in the early 70's with active exploration programs in Scotland and north Wales. The exploration program consisted of soil and stream sampling and limited Induced Polarisation and fluxgate magnetometer surveys. These programs were sufficiently advanced to give rise to drilling programs in Snowdonia (Hafod y llan) either side of the Watkin path, and also in Wester Ross just outside Locharron. Copper mineralisation was encountered in the Welsh drilling program but essentially nothing in Wester Ross. Drilling in Snowdonia was with a hand portable x-ray rig capable of reaching approximately 100 ft and in Wester Ross with a Boyles Bros. rotary rig drilling to approximately 1000 ft.

== Leadership ==
=== President ===
1. James Young Murdoch, 1922–1956
2. John Ross Bradfield, 1956–1964
3. Richard Valentine Porritt, 1964–1968
4. Alfred Powis, 1968–1982
5. Adam Hartley Zimmerman, 1982–1987
6. David Wylie Kerr, 1987–1995
7. Edward Courtney Pratt, 1995–1997
8. David Wylie Kerr, 1997–2001
9. Derek George Pannell, 2001–2005

=== Chairman of the Board ===
1. James Young Murdoch, 1956–1962
2. John Ross Bradfield, 1964–1974
3. William Stanley Row, 1974–1977
4. Alfred Powis, 1977–1995
5. David Wylie Kerr, 1995–1997
6. Edward Courtney Pratt, 1997–1998
7. Robert James Harding, 1998–2001
8. David Wylie Kerr, 2001–2002

== Company histories ==
- Robert, Leslie. Noranda. Clark, Irwin & Company Limited, 1956.
