= Economic Geology (journal) =

- Discipline: Economic geology
- Language: English
- Edited by: David R. Cooke

Publication details
- History: 1905–present
- Publisher: Economic Geology Publishing Company
- Frequency: 8/year

Standard abbreviations
- ISO 4: Econ. Geol.

Indexing
- ISSN: 0361-0128 (print); 1554-0774 (web)

Links
- Journal homepage

Economic Geology is a peer-reviewed scientific journal about economic geologies published by the Economic Geology Publishing Company from 1905 until 2001, when the company merged with the Society of Economic Geologists (SEG). The Publications Board of the SEG now manages the journal.
