= Alfred Powis =

Canadian businessman (1930–2007)

- Born: 16 September 1930; Montreal, Quebec
- Died: 10 October 2007 (aged 77); Toronto, Ontario
- Education: Westmount High School ('48); McGill University (BCom '51)
- Spouse(s): Shirley Foster Haldenby (m. 1953) Louise Finlayson (m. 1977)

Alfred Powis OC (16 September 1930 – 10 October 2007) was a Canadian businessman. After graduating from Westmount High School, he earned a BComm degree from McGill University. At McGill University, Powis was a member of the Delta Kappa Epsilon fraternity's Tau Alpha chapter. After graduation in 1950, Powis first went to work as an investment analyst at Sun Life Assurance. In 1950, he joined Noranda Mines where he eventually became its president and CEO in 1968 and chairman in 1977.

Alfred Powis was inducted into the Order of Canada in 1984, the Canadian Business Hall of Fame in 1995, and the Canadian Mining Hall of Fame in 1997.
