= Richard Porritt (businessman) =

Canadian mining industry executive

- Born: 14 February 1901; Barrie, Ontario
- Died: 1985
- Education: McGill University (BSc '22)
- Spouse: Doris D'Eyncourt Strickland (m. 1929)

Richard Valentine Porritt (14 February 1901 – 1985) was a Canadian mining industry executive and an inductee to the Canadian Mining Hall of Fame.

Porritt was born 14 February 1901 in Simcoe, Ontario Richard was the fourth child of Frederick Richard Porritt and Honora Frances Bolster. Frederick had immigrated from England in 1880 and appears in the Canadian 1881 census as living at Turtle Mountain, South Western Extension, Manitoba with his two brothers, Frederick and Herbert. Richard's mother and father married on 15 August 1894 in Orillia, Ontario. They appear in the 1911 census living in Simcoe south, Ontario Canada. Richard attended the Royal Military College of Canada in Kingston joining on 28 July 1917 aged 16 and graduated 23 June 1920. He was student number 1309. Afterwards, he attended McGill University, where he obtained a Bachelor of Science in mining in 1922. He worked as a miner at British America Nickel and then at International Nickel Company's Creighton mine in Sudbury.

He worked as a surveyor at Noranda Mines for 48 years from 1926 to 1974. He brought the Waite-Amulet mine near Rouyn, Quebec into production in 1927. In 1955, he was general manager of Noranda subsidiary Gaspé Copper Mines during the development and startup of the Gaspé copper mine in eastern Quebec. Porritt was appointed general manager of Gaspé Copper, a Noranda subsidiary, in September, 1952. In 1964, he became president of Noranda and vice-chairman in 1968 before retiring in 1974. He died in 1985, eleven years after retirement.
