= Maurice Russell Brown =

Canadian journalist

Mort Brown
- Born: Maurice Russell Brown; November 11, 1912; Port Arthur, Ontario, Canada
- Died: June 24, 2008 (aged 95)
- Education: University of Toronto (BSc)

Maurice Russell "Mort" Brown (November 11, 1912 – June 24, 2008) was a Canadian mining journalist.

== Early life and education ==
Brown was born in Port Arthur, now Thunder Bay, Ontario. He graduated from the University of Toronto in 1938 with a B.Sc. in mining engineering.

== Career ==
Brown worked as a mining instructor at the Lakehead Technical Institute from 1947 to 1949. In 1949, he joined the staff of The Northern Miner, Canada's most important mining journal. He became editor in 1977 and publisher in 1985, retiring in 1992.

Brown was inducted into the Canadian Mining Hall of Fame in 1993.
