= Mining Industry Human Resources Council =

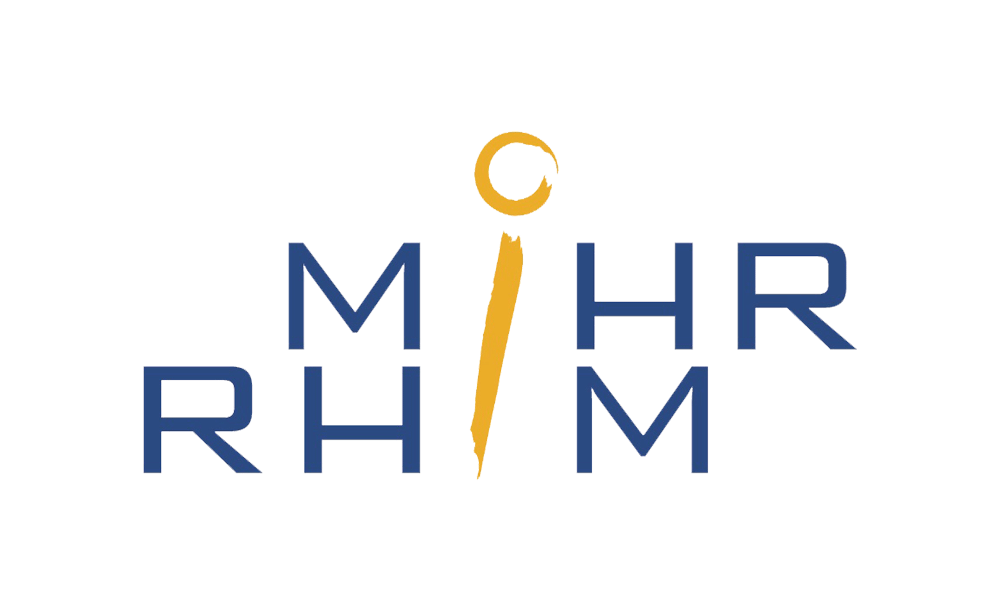
- Abbreviation: MiHR
- Formation: 1996
- Type: Non-profit organization
- Headquarters: 50 Frank Nighbor Place, Unit 105, Kanata, Ontario K2V 1B9
- Services: Mining HR Supply Optimization, Labour Market Intelligence, National Occupational Standards, Training and Certification
- Main organ: Board of Directors
- Staff: 18
- Website: www.mihr.ca

The Mining Industry Human Resources Council (MiHR) is a Canadian, non-profit, organization that drives collaboration among mining and exploration companies, organized labour, contractors, educational institutions, industry associations and Indigenous groups to identify opportunities and address the human resource and labour market challenges facing the Canadian minerals and metals sector.

== Background ==
In 1994, The Canadian Federal Government Whitehorse Mining Initiative (WMI) recommended the establishment of a mining industry council to address sector-wide human resources issues.

In response to the WMI's request, the Mining Industry Training and Adjustment Council (MITAC) was established in November 1996, through the combined efforts of the Mining Association of Canada (MAC) and three major unions in the mining sector: The United Steelworkers of America, the Communication, Energy and Paperworkers Union of Canada and the Canadian Autoworkers Union.

MITAC's goal was to enable Canadian mining companies, unions, and employees to collaborate to improve the quality, cost-effectiveness, availability of training and to maximize the skills, adaptability, and employability of the workers in the minerals and metals sector. Its activities were funded by Human Resources and Skills Development Canada (HRSDC).

After the HRSDC halted funding MITAC's training development initiatives and Youth Opportunities Program in early 2002, they commissioned the council to undertake a sector study. Its 2005 release highlighted the ongoing need for MITAC's expertise in addressing HR challenges facing the mining industry. In particular, the study noted that the industry had to make better use of all potential sources of employment, including youth, women, Indigenous people, and new Canadians. It also highlighted the need to ensure a skilled workforce.

With the study's findings, MITAC undertook a strategic planning process resulting in a new mandate and future direction and function. Effective February 2006, The Mining Industry Training and Adjustment Council (MITAC) was renamed the Mining Industry Human Resources Council (MiHR).

== Services ==
MiHR conducts research into Canada's mining labour market with the objective of uncovering the important HR trends relevant to the industry. This research forms the cornerstone of the programs MiHR undertakes to identify opportunities and address the human resource and labour market challenges within the Canadian minerals and metals sector. They also offer custom research reports for those interested in topics not covered by their standard reports.

To help fill openings and generate new jobs for the Canadian minerals and metals mining industry, MiHR runs a variety of programs such as its Gearing Up and Green Jobs wage subsidy programs, an online Mining Career Quiz, and provides information on its website.

== Programs and Initiatives ==
=== Gearing Up ===
Announced in April 2018, Gearing Up is a work-integrated learning (WIL) program for Canada's mining sector. It aims to create 850 new WIL opportunities in mining over four years. Wage subsidies up to $7,000 are available to employers who create new WIL opportunities, such as co-ops, internships, field placements, applied projects, capstone projects or case competitions.

MiHR works with a national consortium of mining employers, industry associations and post-secondary institutions to implement program activities and inform how industry and education can work together collaboratively to develop WIL opportunities.

=== The Canadian Mining Certification Program (CMCP) ===
The CMCP intends to measure and certify expertise in mining, validating the skills, knowledge, and experience of workers in the mining sector. CMCP is the first - and only - national mining worker certification program in Canada.

CMCP recognizes individual mine workers who have demonstrated their competency and expertise by meeting the National Occupational Standards (NOS) established for the Canadian mining industry. They establish clear, objective skill and knowledge benchmarks, and form the basis for workplace development, driving curriculum development within educational institutes, and the alignment of company training programs.

=== Mining Essentials ===
Mining Essentials is a pre-employment training program for Indigenous peoples who are interested in exploring career options in mining. The program teaches both the essential skills and work readiness skills that the Canadian mining industry has deemed necessary to gain an entry-level position. It is being expanded as part of the National Essential and Work Readiness (NEWR) Skills Training Program for the mining industry to better represent youth, women and immigrants.
