= Prospectors & Developers Association of Canada =

Established in 1932, the Prospectors & Developers Association of Canada (PDAC) represents the interests of the Canadian mineral exploration and development industry. The association is best known for its annual convention and trade show in Toronto. The event regularly attracts more than 25,000 attendees from over 130 countries.

Based in Toronto, Ontario, Canada, PDAC has approximately 8,200 corporate and individual members served by 40 full-time staff.

== PDAC Trade Show and Convention ==
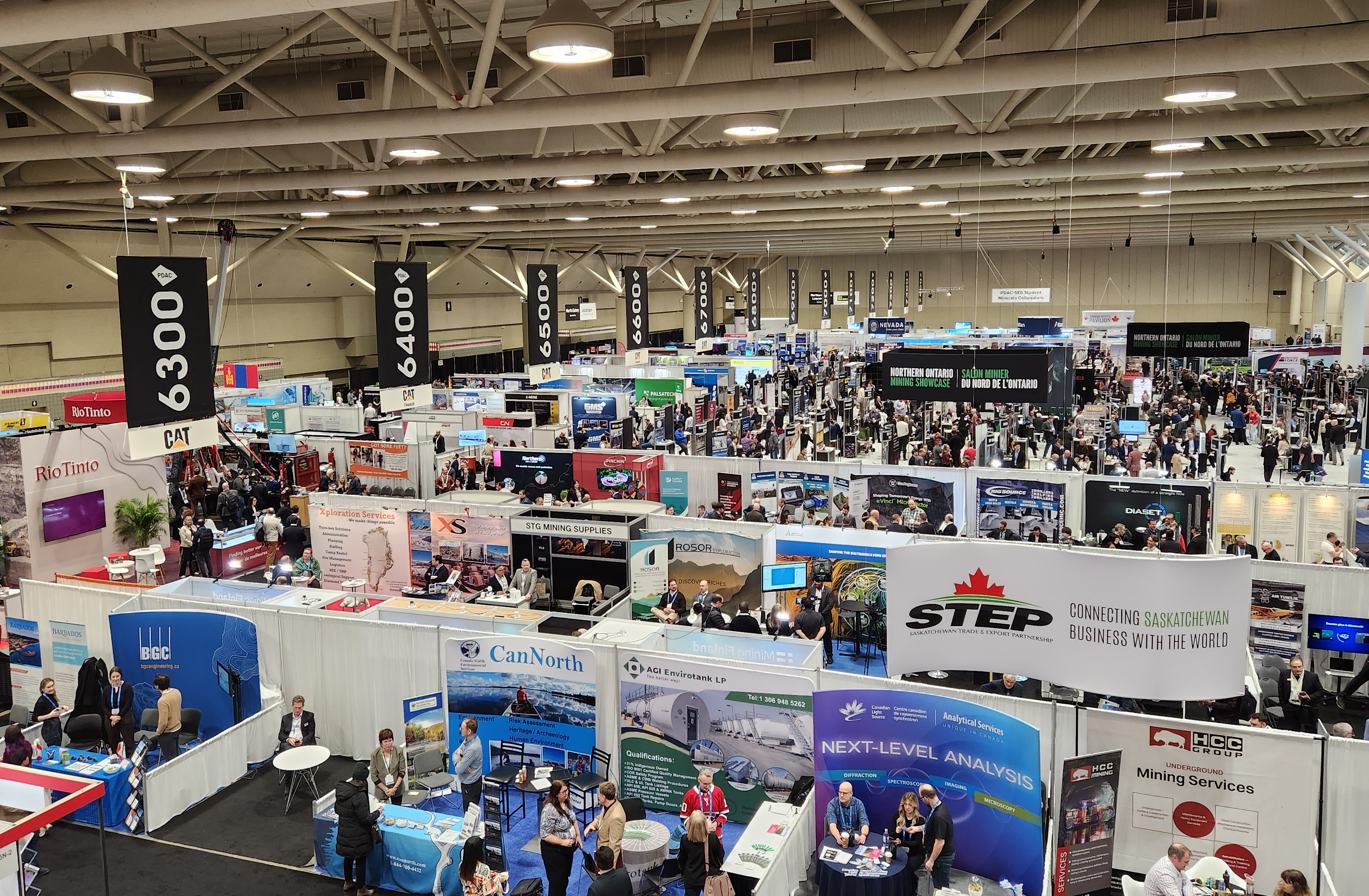
2025 PDAC convention

The annual PDAC Convention—the world's premier mineral exploration and mining convention—is held at the Metro Toronto Convention Centre in downtown Toronto in early March. The show attracts exhibitors, investors, analysts, mining executives, geologists and government officials from across the Americas and the world, including two sitting Canadian prime ministers, Justin Trudeau (2020, 2019) and Stephen Harper (2014). The annual PDAC Convention has grown into a respected institution with an international reputation for networking, deal-making and discussing the current issues, trends and technologies shaping the industry.

== Advocacy ==
PDAC advocates at federal, provincial and territorial levels to support a competitive and responsible Canadian mineral industry where companies are able to effectively explore for, discover and develop the mineral and metal deposits that our modern society depends on. These efforts are focused on ensuring that Canada's mineral exploration and development industry has the tools required to enhance its position as the global destination for mineral investment, remain a key employer in communities across the country, and provide the raw materials that power Canada's economy.

Advocacy work is undertaken on government policy issues of specific concern to the mineral exploration industry, including access to land, Indigenous affairs, international affairs, responsible exploration, finance and taxation, geosciences, and health and safety.

== Membership ==
PDAC is a national organization with over 1,100 corporate members (including mining companies and mining industry service providers) and approximately 6,700 individual members (including prospectors, developers, geoscientists, consultants, mining executives, and students, as well as those involved in the drilling, financial, and legal aspects of exploration).

== PDAC Professional Liability and Business Insurance ==
In co-operation with third-party insurance providers, PDAC offers both professional and business insurance coverage to firms and individuals in the industry who are members of PDAC.
