= John Ross Bradfield =

Canadian businessman (1899–1983)

- Born: 5 April 1899; Morrisburg, Ontario
- Died: 29 October 1983 (aged 84)
- Known for: President and CEO of Noranda
- Spouse: Laura Kathleen Stone (m. 1924)

John Ross Bradfield CC (5 April 1899 – 29 October 1983) was a Canadian businessman who was involved in the development of the Canadian mining industry as president and CEO of Noranda.

Born in Morrisburg, Ontario, he graduated from McGill University in 1922 with a Bachelor of Science degree in civil engineering. He was a field engineer on the construction of Yankee Stadium. He joined Noranda Mines in 1922. In 1927 he became a construction superintendent. Rising in the ranks of the company he became, in 1956, president and chief executive officer and chairman of the board and chief executive officer in 1962. He resigned as CEO in 1968 but remained as chairman of the board until 1974.

In 1973 he was made a Companion of the Order of Canada "for his many contributions to the development of the mining industry and to the growth of the Canadian business community". He is also an inductee of the Canadian Mining Hall of Fame.
