= Society of Economic Geologists =

Scientific society

Society of Economic Geologists, Inc.
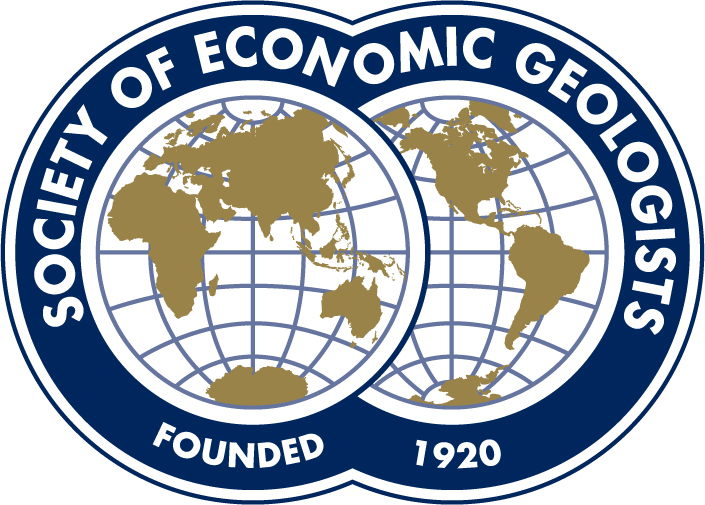

- Industry: Non-profit, Education
- Founded: 1919
- Headquarters: Littleton, Colorado, USA
- Area served: Worldwide
- Website: www.segweb.org

The Society of Economic Geologists (SEG) is a scientific organization that promotes the study of geology as it relates to mining, mineral exploration, mineral resource classification and mineral extraction. The society's Publication Board publishes the scientific journal Economic Geology. The society serves 7,000+ members worldwide with research, publications, courses, and field trips.

== History ==
SEG began in 1919 with a group of Geological Society of America (GSA) with an interest in economic geology. December 28, 1920, 60 distinguished professionals met and established the organization.

== Notable economic geologists ==
- Pavel Pavlovich Goudkoff (Gudkov) (1921). He was the organizer of the journal "Economic Geology" also.
- Josiah E. Spurr (1923-1924)
- C.K. Leith (1925-1926)
- William E. Wrather (1934-1935)
- William O. Hotchkiss, President (1946-1947)
- Anthony J. Naldrett, President (1991-1992)

== See also ==
- List of geoscience organizations
