= Canadian Institute of Mining, Metallurgy and Petroleum =

Canadian professional association

- Formerly: Canadian Mining Institute (1898–1920); Canadian Institute of Mining and Metallurgy (1920–1990)
- Founded: 13 June 1889
- Headquarters: 3500 de Maisonneuve Boulevard W., Westmount, Quebec
- Website: cim.org

The Canadian Institute of Mining, Metallurgy and Petroleum is a Canadian professional association that has existed since 1898. The association is for professionals in the Canadian minerals, metals, materials and energy industries. CIM's members are convened from industry, academia and government.

== History ==
In March 1898, the Canadian Mining Institute was founded in Montreal at the second annual meeting of the Federated Canadian Mining Institute, which was dissolved. The Institute was incorporated by an Act of Parliament to include all former provincial groups except The Mining Society of Nova Scotia, which remained a separate body.

In 1902, The Institute formed its first Branches in Sherbrooke, Quebec, Kingston, Ontario, and Nelson, British Columbia. In 1918, the Mining Society of Nova Scotia formally became affiliated with the Canadian Mining Institute.

In 1920, Metallurgy was added to the name to recognize the inclusion of this discipline.

In 1942, the Institute made CIM its official abbreviation.

In 1990, "Canadian Institute of Mining, Metallurgy and Petroleum" became the official name of the Institute by an Act of Parliament.

In 1996, CIM published its Guidelines for the Estimation, Classification and Reporting of Resources and Reserves. This document became an integral part of National Instrument 43-101 (NI 43-101), the set of rules for reporting and displaying information from mineral properties owned by companies listed on Canadian exchanges that came into effect on Feb. 1, 2001.

1998 was CIM's Centennial Year. A book entitled "Pride and Vision" by E. Tina Crossfield was published in commemoration of the event.

In 2018, CIM celebrated its 120th anniversary. It also launched a completely redesigned site for all of its Standards, Best Practices & Guidance for Mineral Resources & Mineral Reserves materials, including the 2014 update of CIM Definition Standards.

In 2023, CIM celebrated its 125th anniversary.

In 2024, CIM changed its logo.

== Publications ==
- CIM Magazine, a mineral industry publication for information on technology and operations, published 8 times a year.
- CIM Journal, quarterly digital publication for peer-reviewed technical papers. Papers cover all facets of the mining and minerals industry, including geology, mining, processing, maintenance, environmental protection and reclamation, mineral economics and project management. CIM Journal publishes papers in either English or French, with abstracts provided in both languages.
- Canadian Metallurgical Quarterly, the CMQ provides a forum for the discussion and the presentation of both basic and applied research developments in the area of metallurgy and materials
- Exploration and Mining Geology Journal, the Geological Society's own quarterly journal for the publication of Canadian and international papers on applied aspects of mineral exploration and exploitation. (As of 2013, this journal is no longer being published.) ^{See https://www.cim.org/en/Societies-and-Branches/Societies/Geological-Society/Exploration-and-Mining-Geology-Journal.aspx}
- Various books, covering topics from all facets of the mining, minerals and materials industries.

== Branches ==
CIM Branches are organized geographically within three Districts (Western, Central and Eastern) across Canada to address the local needs of members. They discuss regional issues concerning the industry and undertake CIM’s mission at a local level.

Canadian Branches by District

Western District

- Calgary
- Crowsnest
- Edmonton
- North Central BC
- Oil Sands
- Saskatoon
- Saskatoon GeoSection
- South Central BC
- Vancouver

Central District

- GTA West
- Hamilton
- Northern Gateway
- Ottawa
- Porcupine
- Red Lake
- Sudbury
- SudburyGeoSection
- Thunder Bay
- Toronto

Eastern District

- Amos
- Chapais-Chibougamau
- Montréal
- New Brunswick
- Newfoundland and Labrador
- Québec
- Rouyn-Noranda
- Saguenay
- Val d'Or

== Technical Societies ==
CIM’s 12 technical societies strive to promote the development of the many facets of Canada’s minerals, metals, materials and petroleum industries. Technically driven, they come together to discuss issues of concern in their specific field pertaining to the discovery, production and utilization of resources.

Canadian Mineral Processors Society

Environmental and Social Responsibility Society

Geological Society

Health and Safety Society

Information and Technology Society

Maintenance, Engineering and Reliability Society

Management & Economics Society

Metallurgy and Materials Society

Mining Society of Nova Scotia

Society for Rock Engineering

Surface Mining Society

Underground Mining Society

== Awards of Excellence ==
The institute bestows several awards annually to individuals for their outstanding achievements and contributions to their respective fields and to the mining and minerals industries in general.

Branch and Society Awards

- District Distinguished Service Award
- Barlow Medal for Best Geological Paper
- Julian Boldy Memorial Award
- Robert Elver Mineral Economics Award
- McParland Memorial Award for Excellence in Maintenance, Engineering and Reliability
- Mining Engineering for Outstanding Achievement Award
- Mel W. Bartley Outstanding Branch Award
- CIM Rock Mechanics Award

Early Career Awards

- CIM-Bedford Canadian Young Mining Leader Award

Exploration Awards

- A.O. Dufresne Award
- J.C. Sproule Award

Sustainability Awards

- Excellence in Sustainable Development Award
- TSM Community Engagement Excellence Award
- TSM Environmental Excellence Award

Safety Awards

- Hatch-CIM Mining & Minerals Project Development Safety Award
- John T. Ryan Safety Trophies
- Mining Safety Leadership Medal Award

Career Excellence Awards

- CIM Fellowship
- CIM Distinguished Service Medal
- Selwyn G. Blaylock Medal
- Vale Medal for Meritorious Contributions to Mining

Social Responsibility and Education Awards

- Diversity and Inclusion Award
- CIM Indigenous Partnership Award

== Leadership ==
- 1898, 1899 – John E. Hardman
- 1900 – Samuel Stewart Fowler
- 1901, 1902 – Charles Fergie
- 1903, 1904 – Eugene Coste
- 1905, 1906 – George Robert Smith
- 1907 – Frederic Keffer
- 1908, 1909 – Willet Green Miller
- 1910, 1911 – Frank Dawson Adams
- 1912, 1913 – Alfred Ernest Barrow
- 1914, 1915 – George G. S. Lindsey
- 1916, 1917 – Arthur Augustus Cole
- 1918 – Donaldson Bogart Dowling
- 1919 – Donald Hugh McDougall
- 1920 – Orton Edward Simpson Whiteside
- 1921 – C. V. Corless
- 1922 – William R. Wilson
- 1923 – John Alexander Dresser
- 1924 – Robert Charles Wallace
- 1925 – Thomas J. Brown
- 1926 – Lewis Stockett
- 1927 – John L. Agnew
- 1928 – Robert Holden Stewart
- 1929 – Norman Richard Fisher
- 1930 – Justin S. DeLury
- 1931 – Francis William Gray
- 1932 – John Andrew Allan
- 1933 – Balmer Neilly
- 1934 – Selwyn Gwillym Blaylock
- 1935 – John Gordon Ross
- 1936 – George Edwards Cole
- 1937 – Michael Dwyer
- 1938 – Everett Alfred Collins
- 1939 – Benjamin Leonard Thorne
- 1940 – George Cecil Bateman
- 1941 – Wilbert George McBridge
- 1942, 1943 – Robert A. Bryce
- 1944 – A. Allen Mackay
- 1945 – Alan Emerson Cameron
- 1946 – Richard J. Ennis
- 1947 – Charles Camsell
- 1948 – Randolph William Diamond
- 1949 – Frederick Victor Siebert
- 1950 – Alphone-Olivier Dufresne
- 1951 – Oliver B. Hopkins
- 1952 – Desmond Fife Kidd
- 1953 – Arthur Edward Flynn
- 1954 – Charles Coombs Huston
- 1955 – Alfred Lloyd Penhale
- 1956 – John Fortune Walker
- 1957 – Horace John Fraser
- 1958 – David G. Burchell
- 1959 – John Campbell Sproule
- 1960 – William Henry Durell
- 1961 – James Buckland Mawdsley
- 1962 – John Ross Bradfield
- 1963 – William James Johnson
- 1964 – Ralph D. Parker
- 1965 – Frank A. Forward
- 1966 – George Wheeler Govier
- 1967 – Edward Dow Brown
- 1968 – Paul-Émile Auger
- 1969 – James Merritt Harrison
- 1970 – Harold M. Wright
- 1971 – Thomas Herbert Patching
- 1972 – John H. Schloen
- 1973 – James Parker Nowland
- 1974 – William M. Gilchrist
- 1975 – Patrick D. O'Connell
- 1976 – W. Mel Bartley
- 1977 – Robert D. Lord
- 1978 – Jean-Paul Drolet
- 1979 – E. H. Caldwell
- 1980 – Donald Earle G. Schmitt
- 1981 – Noel A. Cleland
- 1982 – R. Heath Gray
- 1983 – Peter V. Young
- 1984 – Walter J. Riva
- 1985 – Steven W. Harapiak
- 1986 – Charles Bruce Ross
- 1987 – Lindsay Milne
- 1988 – René Dufour
- 1989 – John J. Laffin
- 1990 – Peter Tarassoff
- 1991 – William E. Stanley
- 1992 – A. D. Anton
- 1993 – David S. Robertson
- 1994 – William Almdal
- 1995 – Georgio Massobrio
- 1996 – Donald Joseph Worth
- 1997 – Alexander M. Laird
- 1998 – Yves Harvey
- 1999 – Gerald L. Bolton
- 2000 – Patricia Joan Dillon
- 2001 – Rex V. Gibbons
- 2002 – Soheil Asgarpour
- 2003 – Howard R. Stockford
- 2004 – W. Warren Holmes
- 2005 – Russell E. Hallbauer
- 2006 – François E. Pelletier
- 2007 – James L. Popowich
- 2008 – James K. Gowans
- 2009 – Michael J. Allan
- 2010 – Chris Twigge-Molecey
- 2011 – Charles Edwards
- 2012 – Terence Bowles
- 2013 – Robert Schafer
- 2014 – Sean Waller
- 2015 – Garth Kirkham
- 2016 – Michael Winship
- 2017 – Ken Thomas
- 2018 – Janice Zinck
- 2019 – Roy Slack
- 2020 – Samantha Espley
- 2021 – Pierre Julien
- 2022 – Anne Marie Toutant
- 2023 – Michael Cinnamond
- 2024 – Ian Pearce
- 2025 – Candace MacGibbon
- 2026 – John Rhind
- 2027 – Randy Smallwood
- 2028 – Lucy Potter
