= James Monger =

Canadian geologist

- Born: James W.H. Monger
- Education: University of Reading (BSc); University of Kansas (MSc); University of British Columbia (PhD)
- Awards: R. J. W. Douglas Medal (1995); Logan Medal (2002)
- Scientific career
- Fields: Geology

James (Jim) W.H. Monger is an emeritus scientist of the Geological Survey of Canada and a world leader in the application of plate tectonics to the study of mountain chain formation.

== Education ==
Monger obtained his BSc at the University of Reading, his MSc at the University of Kansas, and his PhD at the University of British Columbia (1966).

== Career ==
Dr. James Monger is an authority on Cordilleran geology. Monger concentrated his research on field studies and detailed geological mapping of upper Paleozoic and lower Mesozoic volcanic and sedimentary layers. He used this work to demonstrate that the Canadian Cordillera is a collage of displaced terranes that have been accreted to the western margin of North America.

Over his 40-year career as a research geoscientist with the Geological Survey of Canada he contributed the following to geological studies;

- the first plate tectonic interpretations of the evolution of the Canadian Cordillera
- the first metamorphic map of the Canadian Cordillera
- an award-winning paper on suspect terranes that evolved into the first terrane map of the Cordillera
- a proposal for the collisional origin for the two major plutonic belts
- the first trans-Cordilleran structure section that integrated geological, geophysical and geochemical data.

Monger led the Global Geoscience Transects Project. He had an essential role in the Canadian LITHOPROBE Project.

In 1997, Dr. Monger began working at the Simon Fraser University as an adjunct professor in the Department of Earth Science. There he has developed and taught an undergraduate course and collaborate on research projects with earth science faculty and researchers

== Personal life ==
As of 2006, he was living on the Saltspring Island in British Columbia, Canada.

== Awards ==
- 1995 - Presented the R. J. W. Douglas Medal by the Canadian Society of Petroleum Geologists
- 2002 - The Logan Medal is the highest award of the Geological Association of Canada.

== Publications ==
- 1987 - authored Circum-Pacific Orogenic Belts and Evolution of the Pacific Ocean Basin.
- 2003 - co-authored with R. A. Price, Transect Of The Southern Canadian Cordillera From Calgary To Vancouver: Field Trip Guidebook 2003
- 2005 - co-authored with William Henry Mathews, Roadside Geology of Southern British Columbia
