= List of geology awards =

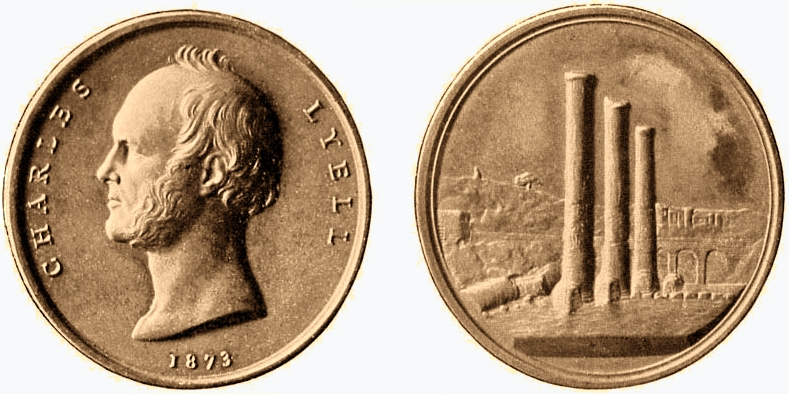
Lyell Medal, Geological Society of London, 1876

This list of geology awards is an index to articles on notable awards for geology, an earth science concerned with the solid Earth, the rocks of which it is composed, and the processes by which they change over time. Geology can also include the study of the solid features of any terrestrial planet or natural satellite such as Mars or the Moon. The list is organized by region and country of the organization that sponsors the award, but awards are not always restricted to people from that country. See list of earth sciences awards for awards for earth sciences in general, and for other branches of earth science.

== Americas ==
=== Canada ===
Country	Award	Sponsor	Notes
Canada	AAG Gold Medal	Association of Applied Geochemists	Outstanding scientific achievement in exploration geochemistry
Canada	Ambrose Medal	Geological Association of Canada	Individual for sustained dedicated service to the Canadian earth science community
Canada	Bancroft Award	Royal Society of Canada	Publication, instruction, and research in the earth sciences that have conspicuously contributed to public understanding and appreciation of the subject
Canada	Berry Medal	Mineralogical Association of Canada	Important contributions to mineral science in Canada or for significant long-term service to the Mineralogical Association of Canada
Canada	Barlow Memorial Medal	Canadian Institute of Mining, Metallurgy and Petroleum	Best paper on economic geology published by the Institute
Canada	Career Achievement Award	Geological Association of Canada	Career achievements in the field of volcanology and/or igneous petrology
Canada	E. R. Ward Neale Medal	Geological Association of Canada	Sustained outstanding efforts in sharing earth science with Canadians
Canada	Hawley Medal	Mineralogical Association of Canada	
Canada	J. Tuzo Wilson Medal	Canadian Geophysical Union	Outstanding contribution to the field of geophysics in Canada
Canada	Logan Medal	Geological Association of Canada	Sustained distinguished achievement in Canadian earth science
Canada	Peacock Medal	Mineralogical Association of Canada	
Canada	Pinch Medal	Mineralogical Association of Canada	
Canada	R. J. W. Douglas Medal	Canadian Society of Petroleum Geologists	Outstanding contributions to the understanding of sedimentary geology in Canada, commending major contributions to regional tectonics, petroleum and structural geology
Canada	Selwyn G. Blaylock Medal	Canadian Institute of Mining, Metallurgy and Petroleum	Distinguished service to Canada through exceptional achievement in the field of mining, metallurgy, or geology
Canada	Undergraduate Student Award	Mineralogical Association of Canada	
Canada	W. W. Hutchison Medal	Geological Association of Canada	Young individual for recent exceptional advances in Canadian earth science research
Canada	Willet G. Miller Medal	Royal Society of Canada	Outstanding research in any branch of the earth sciences
Canada	Young Scientist Award	Mineralogical Association of Canada	
Canada	Yves Fortier Earth Science Journalism Award	Geological Association of Canada	Journalist who is a resident of Canada and who has been exceptionally effective in presenting one or more earth science stories

=== Chile ===
Country	Award	Sponsor	Notes
Chile	Medalla al Mérito “Juan Brüggen”	Colegio de Geólogos	Merit in geology

=== United States ===
Country	Award	Sponsor	Notes
United States	Arthur L. Day Medal	Geological Society of America	Outstanding distinction in contributing to geologic knowledge through the application of physics and chemistry to the solution of geologic problems
United States	Arthur L. Day Prize and Lectureship	National Academy of Sciences	Scientist making new contributions to the physics of the Earth whose four to six lectures would prove a solid, timely, and useful addition to the knowledge and literature in the field
United States	Charles Doolittle Walcott Medal	National Academy of Sciences	Individual achievement in advancing knowledge of Cambrian or Precambrian life and its history
United States	Dana Medal	Mineralogical Society of America	Outstanding scientific contributions through original research in the mineralogical sciences by an individual in the midst of his or her career
United States	F.W. Clarke Medal	Geochemical Society	Outstanding contribution to geochemistry or cosmochemistry
United States	G. K. Gilbert Award	Geological Society of America	Outstanding contributions to the solution of fundamental problems in planetary geology in the broadest sense, which includes geochemistry, mineralogy, petrology, geophysics, geologic mapping, and remote sensing
United States	G. K. Warren Prize	National Academy of Sciences	Distinguished accomplishment in fluviatile geology and closely related aspects of the geological sciences
United States	Hayden Memorial Geological Award	Academy of Natural Sciences of Drexel University	Geology
United States	Israel C. Russell Award	Geological Society of America	For major achievements in limnogeology—broadly defined and including limnogeology, limnology and paleolimnology—through contributions in research, teaching and service.
United States	John Wesley Powell Award	United States Geological Survey	Noteworthy contributions to the objectives and mission of the USGS
United States	Kirk Bryan Award	Geological Society of America	Published paper of distinction advancing the science of geomorphology or Quaternary geology
United States	M. King Hubbert Award	National Ground Water Association	Major science or engineering contribution to groundwater research
United States	Mary Clark Thompson Medal	National Academy of Sciences	Important service to geology and paleontology
United States	Meinzer Award	Geological Society of America	Publication or body of publications that have significantly advanced the science of hydrogeology or a closely related field.
United States	Penrose Gold Medal	Society of Economic Geologists	Full career in the performance of unusually original work in the earth sciences
United States	Penrose Medal	Geological Society of America	Eminent research in pure geology, for outstanding original contributions or achievements that mark a major advance in the science of geology
United States	Roebling Medal	Mineralogical Society of America	Scientific publication of outstanding original research in mineralogy
United States	Sidney Powers Memorial Award	American Association of Petroleum Geologists	Distinguished and outstanding contributions to, or achievements in, petroleum geology
United States	Stanley Miller Medal	National Academy of Sciences	Research on Earth's early development as a planet, including prebiotic chemistry and the origin of life; planetary accretion, differentiation, and tectonics; and early evolution of the atmosphere and oceans
United States	Vetlesen Prize	Columbia University and G. Unger Vetlesen foundation	Scientific achievement resulting in a clearer understanding of the Earth, its history, or its relations to the universe
United States	William H. Twenhofel Medal	Society for Sedimentary Geology	Outstanding contributions to sedimentary geology

== Europe ==
Country	Award	Sponsor	Notes
Denmark	Steno Medal	Geological Society of Denmark	Prominent geologist
Europe	Medal of Merit	European Federation of Geologists	Individuals who provided exceptional and distinguished contributions to the geological profession in Europe
Europe	Houtermans Award	European Association of Geochemistry	Outstanding contributions to geochemistry made by scientists under 35 years old or within 6 years of their PhD award
Europe	Louis Néel Medal	European Geosciences Union	Outstanding contributions in the application of experimental and theoretical methods of solid state physics to the study of earth sciences
Europe	Science Innovation Award	European Association of Geochemistry	Particularly important and innovative breakthrough in geochemistry
Europe	Urey Medal	European Association of Geochemistry	Outstanding contributions advancing Geochemistry over a career
Germany	Albrecht-Penck-Medaille	German Quaternary Union	Outstanding contributions in the fields of Quaternary science
Germany	Gustav Steinmann Medal	German Geological Society – Geological Association	Outstanding contributions in the fields of geology and earth sciences
Germany	Hans Stille Medal	German Society for Geosciences	Outstanding contributions in the fields of geology and earth sciences
Norway	Reusch Medal	Norwegian Geological Society	Young researchers in recognition of a high-quality treatise on geology
United Kingdom	Aberconway Medal	Geological Society of London	Distinction in the practice of geology with special reference to work in industry
United Kingdom	Bigsby Medal	Geological Society of London	Study of American geology
United Kingdom	Bolitho Medal	Royal Geological Society of Cornwall	Notable achievement in geology.
United Kingdom	Copley Medal	Royal Society	Outstanding achievements in research in any branch of science.
United Kingdom	Lyell Medal	Geological Society of London	Significant contributions to soft rock studies
United Kingdom	Max Hey Medal	Mineralogical Society of Great Britain and Ireland	Research of excellence carried out by young workers
United Kingdom	Mineralogical Society-Schlumberger Award	Mineralogical Society of Great Britain and Ireland	Scientific excellence in mineralogy and its applications
United Kingdom	Murchison Fund	Geological Society of London	Researchers under the age of 40 who have contributed substantially to the study of hard rock and tectonic geology
United Kingdom	Murchison Medal	Geological Society of London	Significant contribution to geology by means of a substantial body of research and for contributions to 'hard' rock studies
United Kingdom	Prestwich Medal	Geological Society of London	Advancement of the Science of Geology
United Kingdom	Sue Tyler Friedman Medal	Geological Society of London	Work on the history of geology
United Kingdom	William Smith Medal	Geological Society of London	Outstanding research in applied or economic geology
United Kingdom	Wollaston Medal	Geological Society of London	Substantial body of excellent research in either or both 'pure' and 'applied' aspects of the science

== Other regions ==
Country	Award	Sponsor	Notes
Australia	Clarke Medal	Royal Society of New South Wales	Distinguished work in the Natural sciences
India	Krishnan Medal	Indian Geophysical Union	Outstanding geophysicist/geologist whose age does not exceed 40 years for outstanding work in specific branches of geophysics/geology and related geosciences
India	S.M. Naqvi Gold Medal	Geological Society of India	Scientist below the age of 60 years for outstanding contributions in any field of Indian Geology
International	Andrei Borisovich Vistelius Research Award	International Association for Mathematical Geosciences	Promising contributions in research in the application of mathematics or informatics in any field of the earth sciences
International	Felix Chayes Prize	International Association for Mathematical Geosciences	Excellence in research in mathematical petrology
International	Georges Matheron Lectureship	International Association for Mathematical Geosciences	Research ability in the field of spatial statistics or mathematical morphology
International	IAMG Distinguished Lectureship	International Association for Mathematical Geosciences	Individual with demonstrated ability to communicate mathematical concepts to general geological audience, clear enthusiasm for mathematical geology, recognition fork in their field etc.
International	John Cedric Griffiths Teaching Award	International Association for Mathematical Geosciences	Outstanding teaching with preference for teaching that involves application of mathematics or informatics to the Earth's nonrenewable natural resources or to sedimentary geology
International	Seligman Crystal	International Glaciological Society	Outstanding scientific contribution to glaciology so that the subject is now enriched
International	Thorarinsson Medal	International Association of Volcanology and Chemistry of the Earth's Interior	Outstanding contributions to the general field of volcanology
International	William Christian Krumbein Medal	International Association for Mathematical Geosciences	Senior scientists for career achievement, (a) distinction in application of mathematics or informatics in the earth sciences, (b) service to the IAMG, or (c) support to professions involved in the earth sciences

== See also ==
- Lists of awards
- Lists of science and technology awards
- List of earth sciences awards
- List of geography awards
- List of geophysics awards
