= Raymond Thorsteinsson =

Canadian geologist

Dr. Raymond Thorsteinsson
- Born: January 21, 1921; Wynyard, Saskatchewan, Canada
- Died: April 23, 2012 (aged 91); Calgary, Alberta, Canada
- Education: University of Saskatchewan; University of Toronto; University of Kansas
- Known for: Arctic Geology; Paleontology
- Awards: Order of Canada (OC); Gold Medal; Willet G. Miller Medal; Logan Medal; Massey Medal; R.J.W. Douglas Medal
- Scientific career
- Fields: Geology
- Workplaces: Geological Survey of Canada (GSC)

Raymond Thorsteinsson, OC FRSC (January 21, 1921 – April 23, 2012) was a Canadian geologist who focused on the geology of the high Arctic. He was a Fellow of The Arctic Institute of North America, primarily known for his contribution to the geology of the Proterozoic and Paleozoic rocks.

== Biography ==
Thorsteinsson was born in Wynyard, Saskatchewan of Icelandic heritage. He obtained a BSc in geology at the University of Saskatchewan (1944) and an MSc in geology at the University of Toronto. In 1955, he earned a PhD from the University of Kansas.

Thorsteinsson began work in the Canadian Arctic Archipelago, in 1947, as a summer field assistant. One of his assignments included an epic canoe trip with Dr. Y.O. Fortier to perform geological reconnaissance in the centre of the largely unknown Arctic region. He began his lifelong career with the Geological Survey of Canada in 1952. He spent most of his time studying the Arctic. At first, his fieldwork was completed on foot and by dog team. He advanced the study of the Canadian Arctic by pioneering the method of landing small aircraft, with oversize tires, in remote places on the Arctic Islands. His work and that of his fellow geologists at the GSC led to extensive land acquisitions during the late 1950s and early 1960s by oil and mining companies.

Dr. Thorsteinsson made significant contributions in the fields of structural geology and biochronology, as well as in regional stratigraphy. In 1973, the Royal Society of Canada noted

His work is particularly characterized by its breadth and includes structural, stratigraphic, and biochronological histories of the enormously thick rock succession of the Islands and forms the basis of all future work. As a result of his studies the geological history and sedimentary column in the Islands are better understood than those in many areas of Canada that have been studied far longer. Few scientists have been fortunate enough to be presented with such a challenge and opportunity, and few could have risen to and mastered such a challenge.

During his career, he directed several large helicopter-supported geological surveys that included other geologists from the Geological Survey of Canada and various universities working under his supervision. These surveys have resulted in the production of detailed geological maps and reports covering approximately 250,000 square miles of territory in the Canadian Arctic Archipelago. His studies have taken him to every major island in the Archipelago, some of which he was the first to visit since their discovery by early explorers.

Thorsteinsson published more than fifty maps and articles. His geological maps had scales varying from 1/125,000 to 1/500,000.

Thorsteinsson also performed paleontological studies. He made fundamental advances in the knowledge of graptolites and of the extinct, primitive jawless fishes referred to as ostracoderm that lived some 400 million years ago. In 1955 and 1956, he was a visiting scientist at Sweden's Museum of Natural History where he conducted studies on these fossils. He also established the most complete succession of faunal zones in Pennsylvanian and Permian rocks in the Arctic.

Thorsteinsson was officially retired from the Geological Survey of Canada in 1992, but continued his studies in Arctic Research as an emeritus scientist with the GSC until his death in 2012. At the time of his retirement in 1992, he had completed 39 field seasons in the Canadian Arctic Archipelago.

== Awards ==
- 1951, Shell Oil Fellowship, University of Kansas
- 1952, Erasmus Haworth Award, University of Kansas, presented to outstanding graduate student of the year
- 1960, Made Fellow of The Royal Society of Canada
- 1960, Made Fellow of the Arctic Institute of North America
- 1960, Medal of Merit, presented by the Alberta Society of Petroleum Geologists (received jointly with E.T. Tozer), awarded for outstanding paper on Canadian geology during the year
- 1961, Distinguished Lecturer for the American Association of Petroleum Geologists
- 1964, Erasmus Haworth Award, University of Kansas, presented on occasion to distinguished alumni
- 1969, Awarded the Patron's Medal by the Royal Geographical Society, London, for contributions to exploration and economic development in the Canadian Arctic
- 1973, Awarded the Willet G. Miller Medal by the Royal Society of Canada for outstanding achievement in Earth Science
- 1973, Outstanding Achievement Award in Science, presented by the Government of the province of Alberta
- 1979, Awarded the Logan Medal by the Geological Association of Canada
- 1981, Awarded the Massey Medal by Royal Canadian Geographical Society, and presented by the Governor General of Canada, for outstanding personal achievement
- 1982, Awarded the R. J. W. Douglas Medal by the Canadian Society of Petroleum Geologists
- 1983, made a Member of the Order of Canada
- 1987, Awarded the Gold Medal of The Professional Institute of the Public Service of Canada (PIPSC), for meritorious achievement (received jointly with Drs. R.L. Christie and H.P. Trettin)
- 1989, promoted to an Officer of the Order of Canada
- 1988, Astolabe Award, awarded by the National Capital Commission (NCC), Ottawa, for exceptional personal achievement in the physical environment
- 1992, Commemorative Medal, 125th Anniversary of Canadian Confederation
