= Gerard V. Middleton =

Canadian geologist (1931–2021)

Gerard Viner Middleton FRSC (May 13, 1931 – November 2, 2021), often known as Gerry Middleton, was a Canadian geologist and university teacher.

== Biography ==
Middleton was born in South Africa and educated in England. He obtained his batchelors (1952) and doctorate (1954) degrees from Imperial College London. He emigrated to Canada in 1954, and taught at McMaster University from 1955 to 1996. Over his career his main fields of research were physical sedimentology, data analysis in geology, and the history of geology. He published over 100 papers in scholarly journals, and several books, including Origin of Sedimentary Rocks (1972, second edition 1980; with H. Blatt and R. Murray), Mechanics in the Earth and Environmental Sciences (1994; with P.R. Wilcock), and Data Analysis in the Earth Sciences using MATLAB (2000). He organized the SEPM Research Symposium on Sedimentary Structures in Toronto, (1964) and SEPM’s first Short Course (on turbidites, Anaheim CA, 1973). From 1973 to 1978 he was the founding editor of Geoscience Canada, a magazine published by the Geological Association of Canada.

In sedimentology, his most influential publications were on turbidity currents and their deposits, and on the origin of physical sedimentary structures and textures. He organized the Congress of the International Association of Sedimentologists, held at McMaster in 1982, and attended by 1200 registrants from 42 countries. His last major work was as editor of Encyclopedia of Sediments and Sedimentary Rocks (2003).

Since then, he has published a summary of the history of geology in Canada, and short biographies of Canadian geologists. Another Canadian geologist Joseph William Winthrop Spencer (1851–1921; born in Dundas, ON) was the subject of a more extensive study. He has also published historical studies of geologists elected the Royal Society of Canada during its first fifty years, and the history of the earth sciences during the twentieth century. During the last five years he has studied the source of the stone used for building in nineteenth-century southern Ontario.

He was an emeritus professor in the School of Geography and Earth Sciences at McMaster University. He died on November 2, 2021, at the age of 90.

== Affiliations ==
- Canadian Science and Technology Historical Association
- Canadian Society of Petroleum Geologists (Honorary Member)
- Geological Association of Canada (President, 1987–1988)
- Geological Society of America
- History of Earth Sciences Society
- International Association of Sedimentologists (Honorary Member)
- SEPM, Society for Sedimentary Geology (Honorary Member)

== Accolades ==
- 1970, elected Fellow of the Royal Society of Canada
- 1980, Logan Medal, Geological Association of Canada
- 1995, Major Coke Medal, Geological Society of London
- 1998, Distinguished Educator Award, American Association of Petroleum Geologists
- 2003, William H. Twenhofel Medal, Society for Sedimentary Geology

== Often cited publications ==
- G. V. Middleton (editor) (1965). Primary Sedimentary Structures and their Hydrodynamic Interpretation: Society of Economic Paleontologists and Mineralogists, Special Publication No. 12, 265p.
- G. V. Middleton (1966-7). Experiments on density and turbidity currents: Canadian Journal of Earth Sciences, I, v. 3, p. 523-546; II, v. 3, p. 627- 637; III, v. 4, p. 475-505.
- G. V. Middleton (1973). Johannes Walther's Law of Correlation of Facies: Geological Society of America Bulletin, v. 38, p. 979-988.
- G. V. Middleton and M. A. Hampton (1973). Part I. Sediment gravity flows: mechanics of flow and deposition, in G. V. Middleton and A. H. Bouma (eds.), Turbidites and Deep Water Sedimentation. Anaheim, California, S.E.P.M. Pacific Section Short Course Notes, 38p.
- G. V. Middleton (1976). Hydraulic interpretation of sand size distributions: Journal of Geology, v. 84:, p. 405-426.
- G. V. Middleton and J. B. Southard (1977). Mechanics of Sediment Movement: Society of Economic Paleontologists and Mineralogists, Short Course Notes no. 3, 240 p. Second edition 1985.
- Middleton, G.V. (1993) Sediment deposition from turbidity currents. Annual Review of Earth and Planetary Sciences, v.21, p. 89-114.
- Middleton, G.V. (2005) Spencer, Joseph William Winthrop. Dictionary of Canadian Biography.
- Middleton, G.V. (2006) Andrew Cowper Lawson (1861–1952): How a boy from Canada became a legendary professor of geology at Berkeley. GSA Today, v.16, no.4/5, p. 50-51.
- Middleton, G.V. (2007) Chronology of events in geology in the twentieth century. Northeastern Geology & Environmental Sciences, v.29(2), p. 137-157; v.29(3), p. 245-254.
