= Roger G. Walker =

Canadian geologist

Roger G. Walker, FRSC, MMR (26 March 1939 – 14 August 2026) was a geologist and an award-winning emeritus professor at McMaster University in Hamilton, Ontario, Canada.

Walker obtained his D.Phil. from Oxford University. He was a postdoctoral fellow at Johns Hopkins University. For 32 years, he taught at McMaster University. In 1998, Walker left McMaster to be a consultant in Calgary, Alberta.

In 2013, Walker achieved the title of Master Model Railroader from the National Model Railroad Association.

== Honours ==
- made a Fellow of the Royal Society of Canada
- made an honorary member of Society of Sedimentary Geology

== Awards ==
- 1975, awarded the Past Presidents' Medal by the Geological Association of Canada
- 1990, awarded the R. J. W. Douglas Medal by the Canadian Society of Petroleum Geologists
- 1999, awarded the Logan Medal by the Geological Association of Canada
- awarded the Francis J. Pettijohn Medal by the Society of Sedimentary Geology
- awarded the Henry Clifton Sorby Medal by the International Association of Sedimentologists
- awarded the Distinguished Educator Award by the American Association of Petroleum Geologists
