= R. J. W. Douglas =

Canadian geologist

R. J. W. Douglas FRSC
- Born: Robert John Wilson Douglas; 1920
- Died: 1979 (aged 58–59)
- Education: Columbia University; Queen's University at Kingston
- Scientific career
- Fields: Geology

Robert John Wilson Douglas FRSC (1920–1979) was a Canadian geologist who made contributions in the fields of structure stratigraphy, sedimentation, and petroleum geology.

== Education ==
Douglas was awarded a Manly B. Baker Scholarship and graduated from Queen's University in geology and mineralogy. He obtained a Ph.D. degree in geology from Columbia University.

== Career ==
Douglas worked as a student assistant for the Geological Survey of Canada. He left the Survey for three years to serve as a navigator with the Royal Canadian Air Force.

Douglas has contributed to our understanding of the structure of the Canadian Rocky Mountains and northern Canada. His exposition of the mechanics of bedding plane thrusts, of back-limb thrust faults and folding of the thrusts forms the basis for the later work carried out in these areas.

Douglas also studied the stratigraphy of the Mississippian system in southern Alberta. These studies provided a detailed description and classification of carbonate rocks and theories on the formation of oil and gas reservoirs.

== Personal life ==
Douglas and his wife Winnifred lived in Ottawa, Ontario with their three children, Isabel, Robert and Gordon. He died of a heart attack in 1979.

== Positions held ==
- 1961-1963, member of the Canadian National Committee, 6th World Petroleum Congress
- 1962-1964, member of the program committee of the American Association of Petroleum Geologists
- 1962-1965, served as associate editor of the Geological Society of America
- Member of the Geological Survey of Canada Committees on Stable Isotopes and Age Determination, and on Library, Stratigraphic Nomenclature
- Committee member on the Geology Advisory Committee of the Alberta Research Council

== Honors and awards ==
- Fellow of the Royal Society of Canada
- Fellow of the Geological Society of America
- Fellow of the Royal Canadian Geographical Society
- Member of the American Association of Petroleum Geologists
- Member of the Alberta Society of Petroleum Geologists
- Member of the National Geographic Society
- 1965, awarded the Willet G. Miller Medal by the Royal Society of Canada
- 1976, awarded the Logan Medal by the Geological Association of Canada
- 1980, the Canadian Society of Petroleum Geologists begins awarding the R. J. W. Douglas Medal

== Select publications ==
- Douglas, R. J. W. (1970) Geology and economic minerals of Canada. Geological Survey of Canada.
- Price, Raymond A.; Douglas, R. J. W. (1972) Variations in tectonic styles in Canada. Toronto: Geological Association of Canada.
- Douglas, R. J. W. (1981) Callum Creek, Langford Creek, and Gap map-areas, Alberta Ottawa and Hull, Quebec: Geological Survey of Canada.
