= Paul F. Hoffman =

Canadian geologist (born 1941)

Paul Felix Hoffman, FRSC, OC (born March 21, 1941) is a Canadian geologist and Sturgis Hooper Professor Emeritus of Geology at Harvard University. He specializes in the Precambrian era and is widely known for his research on Snowball Earth glaciation in the Neoproterozoic era particularly through his research on sedimentary rocks of Namibia.

== Life and career ==
Born 1941 in Toronto, Ontario, he received a B.Sc. from McMaster University in 1964, a M.Sc. from Johns Hopkins University in 1965, and was awarded a Ph.D. by Johns Hopkins University in 1970, where his doctoral advisor was Francis J. Pettijohn.

Paul Hoffman formerly worked for the Geological Survey of Canada and was subsequently the Sturgis Hooper Professor of Geology at Harvard University. He currently resides in Victoria, British Columbia where he has an appointment within the University of Victoria School of Earth and Ocean Science.

He is also the brother of Abby Hoffman, a Pan American Games gold medalist and Olympian in track and field. Both have received the Order of Canada for accomplishments in different fields.

== Honours ==
- In 1974, he was awarded the Geological Association of Canada's Past-Presidents' Medal
- In 1991 he was awarded the Canadian Society of Petroleum Geologists's R. J. W. Douglas Medal
- In 1992 he was awarded the Geological Association of Canada's highest honour, the Logan Medal
- In 1997 he was awarded the Royal Society of Canada's Willet G. Miller Medal
- In 2009 he received the Wollaston Medal of the Geological Society
- In 2010 he received the American Geophysical Union's Walter H. Bucher Medal.
- In 2011 he was awarded the Geological Society of America's Penrose Medal
- In 2012 he was made an Officer of the Order of Canada
- In 2016 he was awarded the Gold Medal of the Royal Canadian Geographical Society
- In 2024 he received the Kyoto Prize in Basic Sciences in the category of "Earth and planetary sciences".

== Works ==
- Hoffman, Paul F. (1968) Stratigraphy of the Lower Proterozoic (Aphebian), Great Slave Supergroup, east arm of Great Slave Lake, District of Makenzie Ottawa: Geological Survey of Canada OCoLC 111430495
- P F Hoffman; D Kurfurst (1988) Geology and tectonics, East Arm of Great Slave Lake, District of Mackenzie, Northwest Territories Ottawa: Geological Survey of Canada OCLC 22412425
- P F Hoffman; L Hall (1993) Geology, Slave craton and environs, District of Mackenzie, Northwest Territories Ottawa: Geological Survey of Canada OCLC 290944947
- Hoffman, P.F., Kaufman, A.J., Halverson, G.P. & Schrag, D.P. (1998) “A Neoproterozoic snowball Earth” Science 281, 1342–46
- Hoffman, P.F. & Schrag, D.P. (2000) “Snowball Earth” Scientific American 282, 68–75
- Hoffman, P.F. & Schrag, D.P. (2002) “The snowball Earth hypothesis: testing the limits of global change” Terra Nova 14, 129–155
- Snowball Earth (2005) Rita Chang & Alan Fine OCLC 165116212
