= Charles R. Stelck =

Canadian geologist (1917–2016)

Charles Richard Stelck
- Born: May 20, 1917; Edmonton, Alberta, Canada
- Died: May 14, 2016 (aged 98); Edmonton, Alberta, Canada
- Education: University of Alberta (B.Sc., M.Sc.); Stanford University (Ph.D)
- Awards: Logan Medal (1982); R.J.W. Douglas Medal (1994); Order of Canada (1997); Canadian Petroleum Hall of Fame (2005)
- Scientific career
- Fields: Geologist; Petroleum geologist Paleontologist; Stratigrapher
- Workplaces: University of Alberta

Charles Richard Stelck, O.C., Ph.D., F.R.S.C., P.Geol. (May 20, 1917 – May 14, 2016) was a Canadian petroleum geologist, paleontologist, stratigrapher, and university professor. He is known for his pioneering work on unraveling the stratigraphy of the Western Canada Sedimentary Basin, and his inspired use of biostratigraphy as an exploration tool for finding petroleum and natural gas fields.

== Career ==
Charlie Stelck was born in Edmonton, Alberta, where he grew up hunting and fishing with his father and learning wilderness survival skills. As a teenager, he spent summers working on geological field parties, and after winning a Tegler Scholarship, he enrolled at the University of Alberta. He intended to pursue a degree in chemistry and education but entered the geology program at the urging of his friend, Robert Folinsbee, obtaining a B.Sc. degree in geology in 1937 and an M.Sc. in 1941. Later, after winning a fellowship from Imperial Oil, he obtained his Ph.D. degree at Stanford University in 1951.

During World War II Dr. Stelck worked on the Canol project and for Imperial Oil, mapping the geology of the Rocky Mountain foothills from Jasper, Alberta to the Canadian Arctic by horseback, canoe, and dogsled. During that time he confirmed that the oil field at Norman Wells in the Northwest Territories was producing from a fossil reef, and he postulated that other such reefs could be present elsewhere in the subsurface of the Western Canada Sedimentary Basin. This work led to the discovery of additional fossil reefs that proved to be excellent petroleum reservoirs, such as the Leduc oil field.

After the war Dr. Stelck began a long career as a professor at the University of Alberta, during which time he was a teacher and mentor to generations of students. Much of his research involved the use of Cretaceous foraminifera for determining biostratigraphy and interpreting paleoecology, and he introduced the use of palynology for unraveling the biostratigraphy of nonmarine sediments to western Canada. His efforts proved to be of great value in the exploration for oil and gas and led directly to a number of major discoveries, including the natural gas fields at Fort St. John and Monkman Pass in northeastern British Columbia.

Dr. Stelck died on May 14, 2016, at the age of 98. During his career he had published more than 100 peer reviewed scientific papers, the last one in the year of his death, as well as writing dozens of works on the geology of Alberta and northeastern British Columbia for various text books. In addition to the many honours he received, some of which are listed below, Asteroid 187680 Stelck is named for him, as are many fossil organisms such as the ammonite Stelckiceras liardense. The University of Alberta has established the C.R. Stelck Chair in Petroleum Geology to continue his work.

== Awards ==
- 1960, elected to the Royal Society of Canada
- 1980, received the Centennial Award of the Association of Professional Engineers and Geoscientists of Alberta
- 1982, received the Rutherford Award for Excellence in Undergraduate Teaching from the University of Alberta
- 1982, awarded the Logan Medal by the Geological Association of Canada
- 1994, awarded the R.J.W. Douglas Medal by the Canadian Society of Petroleum Geologists
- 1997, appointed Officer of the Order of Canada
- 2001, awarded the Stanley Slipper Medal by the Canadian Society of Petroleum Geologists
- 2001, received the Grover Murray Distinguished Educator Award from the American Association of Petroleum Geologists
- 2003, awarded an Honorary Doctor of Science Degree by the University of Alberta
- 2005, inducted into the Canadian Petroleum Hall of Fame
- 2005, received the Alberta Centennial Medal
- 2012, received the Queen's Diamond Jubilee Medal
