= Eric W. Mountjoy =

Canadian geologist (1931–2010)

Eric Walter Mountjoy PhD FRSC (1931 – 18 June 2010) was a Canadian geologist, who spent much of his career as a professor at McGill University. He was a foremost expert on sedimentology, Devonian reefs, carbonate diagenesis, porosity development and the structure of the Rocky Mountains. His research has provided useful applications to the petroleum industry.

== Early life ==
Mountjoy was raised near Calgary, Alberta, in the 1930s and 1940s. Regular visits to the nearby mountains led him into a career of geological research.

He obtained a B.A.Sc. from the University of British Columbia in 1955 and a Ph.D. from the University of Toronto in 1960.

== Career ==
From 1957 to 1963, Mountjoy worked for the Geological Survey of Canada, first as a technical officer, then as a geologist.

He left the survey to be an assistant professor at McGill University. In 1969, he was promoted to associate professor. In 1974, he was made a full professor. Between 1993 and 1998, Mountjoy was a Logan Professor. At the time of his death (2010), he was professor emeritus in the Department of Earth and Planetary Sciences, McGill University.

Most of Mountjoy's research has concentrated on Jasper National Park's Miette area, and in particular on its exposed coral reefs from the Devonian period (395 million to 345 million years ago).

Mountjoy, with Queen's University professor Raymond A. Price, mapped most of the Canadian Rockies between Banff and Jasper. This work produced cross-sections, which have become classic representations of the structure of a thrust-fold mountain belt and have been published in many textbooks.

He also studied ancient and modern reef geology, carbonate petrology and diagenesis, carbonate reservoirs and stratigraphy. He visited and applied his knowledge to the geology of Australia, China and Germany.

He directed the research of over 50 master's and doctoral students, many of whom have gone on to become professors.

Mountjoy died June 18, 2010, in Montreal, Quebec, Canada.

== Honours ==
- 1960, presented the Best Ph.D. thesis award by the Canadian Society of Petroleum Geologists
- 1985, awarded the R. J. W. Douglas Medal by the Canadian Society of Petroleum Geologists
- 1994, 1997, 2001, awarded the Medal of Merit by the Canadian Society of Petroleum Geologists
- 1997, awarded the Logan Medal by the Geological Association of Canada
- 1998, awarded the David Thompson Award for graduate teaching at McGill University
- 1998, awarded the F. J. Pettijohn Medal by the Society for Sedimentary Geology
- 1998, 1999, presented the Service Award by the Canadian Society of Petroleum Geologists
- 1999, made a fellow of the Royal Society of Canada
- 2001, bestowed Honorary Membership in the Canadian Society of Petroleum Geology

In his memory, in 2014 the Geological Association of Canada instituted the Eric Mountjoy Exchange Award. The award is made annually to a student or post-doctoral researcher at a Canadian university, and provides a grant to facilitate travel for research collaboration between their institution and another either within or outside the province of Quebec, depending on their own location.
