= E. R. Ward Neale =

Canadian geologist (1923–2008)

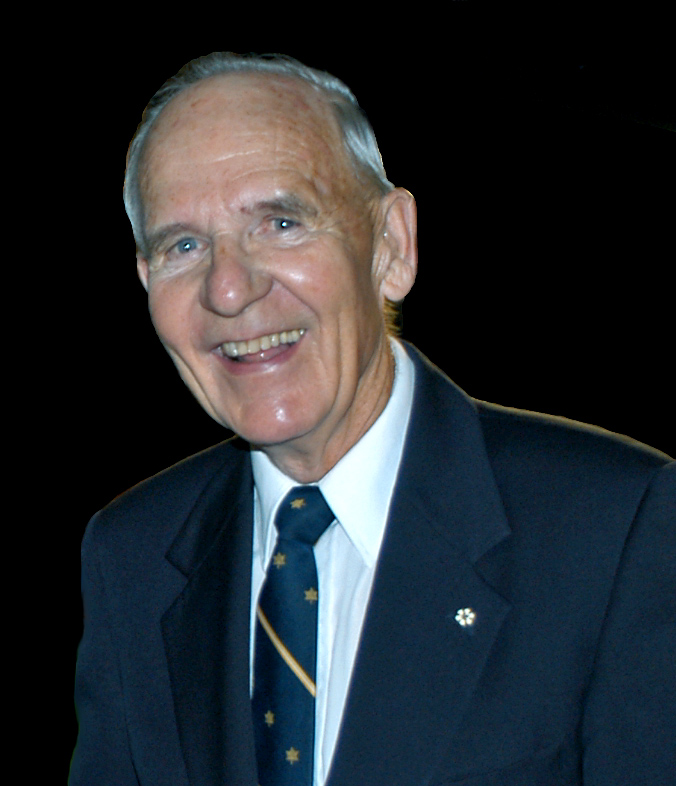
- Born: Ernest Richard Ward Neale; July 3, 1923; Beaconsfield, Québec
- Died: May 20, 2008 (aged 84); Calgary, Alberta
- Citizenship: Canadian
- Education: McGill University; Yale University
- Known for: Expertise in the geology of Appalachian region of Atlantic Canada
- Awards: Bancroft Award; R. T. Bell Medal; Queen Elizabeth II Silver Jubilee Medal; Ambrose Medal
- Scientific career
- Fields: Geology
- Workplaces: Geological Survey of Canada; Memorial University of Newfoundland

Ernest Richard Ward Neale, OC FRSC (July 3, 1923 – May 20, 2008) was a Canadian geologist. His scientific research contributed to the understanding of the large-scale structure of the northern Appalachian mountains of Atlantic Canada. Neale used his enthusiasm for geology to inform students and the general public about discoveries in his field through television, radio, pamphlets, booklets, news magazines, and the popular press.

Neale worked with the Geological Survey of Canada and Memorial University of Newfoundland. He, along with John Rodgers of Yale University, were the first to recognize the transported oceanic sedimentary rocks that overlie ancient shelf deposits in western Newfoundland.

== Early life ==
Neale was born in Beaconsfield, Québec in July 1923. He served in the Royal Canadian Navy during the Second World War between 1943 and 1945. After the war he went to study at McGill University, Montreal. He completed his BSc in 1949. In 1950, Ward married Roxie and they moved to New Haven, Connecticut so Ward could attend Yale University. There he obtained his MSc. (1951) and PhD (1952).

== Career ==
Neale worked briefly as an assistant professor at the University of Rochester, New York, between 1952 and 1954. After that he went on to work for the Geological Survey of Canada. His first position was as to head the Appalachian Geology Section. Between 1963 and 1965, Neale served as the Commonwealth Geology Liaison Officer. When he returned he was given the responsibility to head the Precambrian Geology Section.

In 1968, Neale left the Survey to become Professor and head of the Geology Department at Memorial University of Newfoundland. In 1972, he organized a Montreal-based symposium for the International Geological Congress on Geoscience Aid to developing Countries. This symposium led to the creation of the Association of Geoscientists for International Development.

In 1976, Neale moved to Calgary as Head of the Geological Information Subdivision of the Institute of Sedimentary and Petroleum Geology. He retained his ties to academia whilst in Calgary by holding an adjunct position at the University of Calgary and acting on the University Senate.

In 1982, Neale returned to Newfoundland to accept the position of Vice-President Academic of Memorial University. He held that position until retiring in 1987. After retirement, Ward and his wife moved to Calgary, Alberta.

== Other positions held ==
- 1972-1973, President of the Geological Association of Canada
- 1973-1978, Director of the Canadian Geological Foundation
- 1974-1980, Editor of the Canadian Journal of Earth Sciences
- 1976, President of the Canadian Geoscience Council
- Chaired the Royal Society of Canada's Committee on Public Awareness of Science
- co-Founder of the Calgary Science Network
- 1989, Chair of the Calgary Science Network

== Honours and awards ==
- was a Fellow of the Geological Society of America for over 50 years
- was a Fellow of the Royal Society of Canada
- 1975, awarded the Bancroft Award by the Royal Society of Canada
- 1977, awarded an honorary degree from the University of Calgary
- 1977, awarded a Queen Elizabeth II Silver Jubilee Medal
- 1977, awarded the R. T. Bell Medal by the Canadian Mining Journal
- 1981, awarded a Distinguished Service Award by the Geological Association of Canada
- 1986, awarded the Ambrose Medal of the Geological Association of Canada
- 1990, made an Officer of the Order of Canada
- 1992, awarded the 125th Anniversary of the Confederation of Canada Medal by the Government of Canada
- 1994, honored by the creation of the E. R. Ward Neale Medal by the Geological Association of Canada
- 2003, awarded an honorary award for a significant contribution to the field of education by the International Geoscience Education Organization
