= Ronald M. Clowes =

Canadian geophysicist

Ronald M. Clowes, CM is a professor specializing in seismic and other geophysical studies of the Earth's lithosphere. For his work he has been appointed a member of the Order of Canada.

He completed three degrees while attending the University of Alberta; B.Sc. (1964), M.Sc. (1966), Ph.D. (1969). In 1969–1970, Clowes completed an NRC postdoctoral fellowship at Australian National University. He became a professor at the University of British Columbia in 1970. In 1987, he became the director of Lithoprobe, a national geoscience research project. Clowes continues to teach at UBC as a professor in the Department of Earth and Ocean Sciences. His research, with colleagues and students, focuses on seismic and other geophysical studies of the Earth’s lithosphere; and relation of the results to geology and tectonics.

== Awards ==
- 2005- Logan Medal, Geological Association of Canada’s highest honour
- 2004–2006- Canada Council Killam Research Fellowship
- 2002- Queen Elizabeth II Golden Jubilee Medal
- 1998- Member, Order of Canada
- 1998- J. Tuzo Wilson Medal, Canadian Geophysical Union
- 1997- Distinguished Lecturer Award, The Canadian Institute of Mining, Metallurgy and Petroleum
- 1995- Honorary member, Canadian Society of Exploration Geophysicists
- 1995- Distinguished fellow, Geological Association of Canada
- 1994- Fellow, Royal Society of Canada
- 1993- George P. Woollard Award, Geological Society of America
- 1988- Past President`s Medal, Geological Association of Canada
- 1987-88- Canada Council Killam Research Fellowship (declined);
- 1966, 1981- Best Paper Award, Canadian Society of Exploration Geophysicists
- 1968- Best Paper Award, Geophysics
