= Thomas Edvard Krogh =

Canadian geochronologist

Thomas Edvard Krogh, FRSC (1936 – April 29, 2008) was a geochronologist and a former curator for the Royal Ontario Museum. He revolutionized the technique of radiometric uranium-lead dating with the development of new laboratory procedures and analytical methodologies. His discoveries have yielded an unprecedented level of precision in the dating of Precambrian rocks. Krogh's techniques have become the international de facto standard. The application of these techniques has provided a detailed understanding of the evolution of the Earth's Precambrian shield areas.

== Education ==
Krogh was born in Peterborough, Ontario. Between 1955 and 1959, he studied geological engineering at Queen's University and held several jobs. For the first two summers he worked as a Geological Assistant at Noranda Mines and Triana Explorations, respectively. Between 1957 and 1959, he worked as a Teaching Assistant at the university. In 1958, he supported the Geological Survey of Canada as a Geological Assistant. In 1959, he was a Senior Assistant for the Ontario Department of Mines. Krogh obtained a MSc in geology from the university in 1960. He left Canada to study at the Massachusetts Institute of Technology, where he continued to work whenever he was not studying. His first job was as a Teaching Assistant in Mineralogy, then as a Geologist at Cominco, then as a Research Assistant in Geochronology. In 1964, he obtained his PhD in geochronology.

== Career ==
Between 1964 and 1975, Krogh worked at the Carnegie Institution in Washington, D.C. He was a post-doctoral fellow in isotopic geochemistry until 1964 when he became a Scientific Staff Member. From 1964 to 1970, he specialized in Rubidium–Strontium dating of minerals and rocks. In 1970, he switched to specializing in the Uranium-Lead dating of zircons and other minerals.

In 1975, Krogh returned to Canada to work as the Associate Curator/Director of the Royal Ontario Museum's Geochronology Laboratory. In 1976, he became a professor in the Geology Department of the University of Toronto. In 1978, he shifted to be Graduate Faculty Member with the university.

In 1979, he returned to the Royal Ontario Museum to be their Full Curator.

He worked on the Lithoprobe project between 1991 and 1996.

== Discovery ==
Krogh's main focus of research has been geochronology, an effort which has long involved the integration of field work (particularly in high-grade gneisses of the Grenville Province) with clean-laboratory isotope dilution techniques. With uranium-lead (U-Pb) dating he developed a simple, yet innovative air-abrasion technique for removing exterior portions of minerals that may have suffered Pb-loss, which, combined with improved magnetic separation methods, greatly improved the accuracy and precision of zircon geochronology. In addition, Krogh's laboratory methods for the dissolution of minerals and the subsequent chemical separation of trace quantities of uranium and lead resulted in a significant reduction of environmental Pb contamination (blank) to ultra-low levels, and permitted increasingly small quantities of mineral grains and sub-grain domains to be analyzed. In the mid-1980s, he was instrumental in producing a synthetic 205Pb isotopic tracer (spike) that was distributed for use in U-Pb geochronology laboratories worldwide. The application of Krogh's novel and innovative techniques has revolutionized U-Pb geochronology and permitted the ages of rocks to be determined with unprecedented accuracy and precision. Most of what is known of the Earth's 4.5 billion-year history has been placed in precise geological sequence using these dating methods.

== Honors ==
- 1989, awarded the Logan Medal by the Geological Association of Canada
- 1990, made a fellow of the American Geophysical Union
- 1991, bestowed an honorary D.Sc. by Queen's University
- 1991, awarded the J. Tuzo Wilson Medal by the Canadian Geophysical Union
- 1994, became an elected member of the Norwegian Academy of Science and Letters
- 1995, became a distinguished fellow of the Geological Association of Canada
- 1996, awarded the Past President's Medal by the Mineralogical Association of Canada
- 1997, became a Geochemistry Fellow of the Geochemical Society and European Association of Geochemistry
- 1999, became an elected fellow of the Royal Society of Canada

== Select publications ==
- Davis, D.W., Williams, I.S., Krogh, T.E., 2003. Historical development of zircon geochronology. In Reviews in Mineralogy and Geochemistry, J.M. Hanchar and P.W.O. Hoskin (Editors) volume 53, p. 145-181.
- Krogh, T.E., Kamo, S.L., Gower, C. and Owen, J.V., 2002. Augmented and reassessed U-Pb geochronological data from the Labradorian-Grenvillian front in the Smokey archipelago, eastern Labrador. Canadian Journal of Earth Sciences 39: 831–843.
- Krogh, T.E., Kamo, S.L. and Bohor, B. 1996. Shock metamorphosed zircons with correlated U-Pb discordance and melt rocks with concordant protolith ages indicate an impact origin for the Sudbury Structure. In Earth Processes: reading the isotopic code. A. Basu and S. Hart, eds. Geophysical Monograph 95, Washington, D.C.: American Geophysical Union, pp. 343–353.
- Chen, Y. D., Krogh, T. E., Vetrin, V. R. and Mitrofanov, F. P. 1994. Precise zircon geochronology on Archean rocks sampled by the world's deepest continental borehole, SD-3 Superdeep Well, Kola Peninsula, Russia. ICOG-8 Program with Abstracts, 56..
- Krogh, T.E., Kamo, S.L., Sharpton, V., Marin, L. and Hildebrand, A.R. 1993. U-Pb ages of single shocked zircons linking distal K/T ejecta to the Chicxulub crater. Nature 366: 731–734.
- Krogh, T.E. 1988. High precision U-Pb ages of single zircons and parts of zircon in simple and complex populations. Chemical Geology 70: 70.
- Krogh, T.E. 1982. Improved accuracy of U-Pb zircon ages by the creation of more concordant systems using an air abrasion technique. Geochimica et Cosmochimica Acta 46: 637-649.
- Krogh, T.E. 1961. The titaniferous magnetite deposit of the Newboro District. M.Sc. Thesis, Department of Geology, Queen's University, Kingston, Ontario.
- An entry in Encyclopædia Britannica on isotopic dating.
