= Michael John Keen =

Canadian geologist (1935–1991)

- Born: 1935; Seaford, Sussex
- Died: 8 January 1991 (aged 55–56); Halifax, Nova Scotia
- Education: University College, Oxford and Trinity Hall, Cambridge
- Awards: Logan Medal (1986)
- Scientific career
- Fields: Geology

Michael John Keen (1935–1991) was a British geologist who was born in Seaford, Sussex and emigrated to Canada in 1961. From 1961 to 1977, he was a professor at Dalhousie University in the Department of Geology. He chaired the department for several years. From 1977 to 1991, he was with the Geological Survey of Canada’s Atlantic Geoscience Centre in Dartmouth, Nova Scotia.

== Honours ==
- 1986, awarded the Logan Medal by the Geological Association of Canada

== Legacy ==
- the Marine Geoscience Division of the Geological Association of Canada annually awards the Michael J. Keen Medal to a scientist who has made a significant contribution to the field of marine or lacustrine geoscience.
- Dalhousie University annually awards the Michael J. Keen Memorial Award to a female student in the second year of the earth sciences programme.

== Cited publications ==
- Keen, M.J. September 1968. An Introduction to Marine Geology. The Commonwealth and International library, Geophysics Division.
- Keen, M.J., and Williams, G.L.(editors), 1990. Geology of the continental margin of eastern Canada. Geological Survey of Canada, Geology of Canada, no. 2 (also Geological Society of America, The Geology of North America, V. I-1) 855p.
