= Stephen E. Calvert =

Canadian scientist

Dr. Stephen E. Calvert
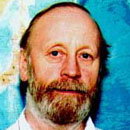
- Born: December 30, 1935 (age 90); London, England
- Education: University of Reading; Scripps Institution of Oceanography
- Awards: Logan Medal; Pettersson Bronze Medal
- Scientific career
- Fields: Geology; Oceanography
- Workplaces: University of British Columbia
- Doctoral advisor: Tj. H. van Andel; E.D. Goldberg

Stephen E. (Steve) Calvert, PhD, FRSC (born December 30, 1935) is a professor emeritus at the University of British Columbia. He has specialized in the study of chemical and geochemical oceanography. His work has shed light on the factors responsible for the wide compositional variability of marine sediments, the controls on organic matter burial and nutrient utilization in the ocean.

Calvert utilizes a combination of organic, inorganic and stable isotopic information to reconstruct past sea surface temperatures, plankton production, terrestrial sediment supply and transport modes, nutrient utilization and bottom water oxygen concentrations.

== Early life and career ==
Calvert was born in London, England in 1935. He studied at the University of Reading, obtaining a bachelor of science degree in 1958. Later, he emigrated to Canada, where he received his Ph.D. from Scripps Institution of Oceanography in 1964. Calvert is also a member of the UCSD Alumni Association. Currently, Calvert is a professor emeritus at the University of British Columbia.

== Honours ==
- 1992, made a fellow of the Royal Society of Canada
- 2000, awarded the Pettersson Bronze Medal by the Royal Swedish Academy of Sciences
- 2001, awarded the Logan Medal by the Geological Association of Canada
- 2001, made a fellow of the American Geophysical Union

== Works ==
Calvert has authored or coauthored numerous papers regarding geochemical oceanography:

- Calvert, S.E.; Pedersen, T.F. (1993). "Geochemistry of Recent oxic and anoxic marine sediments: Implications for the geological record". Marine Geology. 113 (1–2): 67–88. Bibcode:1993MGeol.113...67C. doi:10.1016/0025-3227(93)90150-T.
- Crusius, J.B.; Calvert, S.E.; Pedersen, T.F. (1996). "Rhenium and molybdenum enrichments in sediments as indicators of oxic, suboxic and sulfidic conditions of deposition". Earth and Planetary Science Letters. 145 (1–4): 65–78. Bibcode:1996E&PSL.145...65C. doi:10.1016/S0012-821X(96)00204-X.
- Schubert, C.J.; Calvert, S.E. (2001). "Nitrogen and carbon isotopic composition of marine and terrestrial organic matter in Arctic Ocean sediments:: implications for nutrient utilization and organic matter composition". Deep Sea Research. 48 (3): 789–810. Bibcode:2001DSRI...48..789S. doi:10.1016/S0967-0637(00)00069-8.

He has also contributed to and reviewed multiple published books, including:

- Proxies in Late Cenozoic Paleoceanography Contributor Elsevier May 25, 2007 ISBN 9780444527554
- The Monterey Formation: From Rocks to Molecules Review Columbia University Press 2001 ISBN 9780231105859
