= R. J. W. Douglas Medal =

The R.J.W. Douglas Medal is presented annually by the Canadian Society of Petroleum Geologists in recognition of outstanding contributions to the understanding of sedimentary geology in Canada, commending major contributions to regional tectonics, petroleum and structural geology. The award is open to all geologists who follow the example of R. J. W. Douglas in contributing to the development of Canadian sedimentary, petroleum and structural geology.

== Recipients ==
Source: CSPG

- 2019 - Carol Evenchick
- 2018 - Ashton Embry
- 2017 - David Morrow
- 2016 - Dale Leckie
- 2015 - Don Kent
- 2014 - George Pemberton
- 2013 - James Christopher
- 2012 - Guy Plint
- 2011 - Darrel Long
- 2010 - Deborah Spratt
- 2009 - James Dixon
- 2008 - No recipient
- 2007 – Ed Landing
- 2006 – Margot McMechan
- 2005 – Alan Carson Grant
- 2004 – Pierre-Andre Bourque
- 2003 – Clint Dahlstrom
- 2002 – Graham Davies
- 2001 – No Nomination
- 2000 – Ian Knight
- 1998 – Robert I. Thompson
- 1997 – Peter Jones
- 1996 – Albert W. Bally
- 1995 – James Monger
- 1994 – Charles R. Stelck
- 1993 – Henry Charlesworth
- 1992 – Philip Simony
- 1991 – Paul F. Hoffman
- 1990 – Roger G. Walker
- 1988 – Bruce V. Sanford
- 1987 – James D. Aitken
- 1986 – Hans P. Trettin
- 1985 – Eric W. Mountjoy
- 1984 – Don Norris
- 1983 – Raymond A. Price
- 1982 – James Fyles
- 1981 – Raymond Thorsteinsson
- 1980 – Harold Williams

== See also ==
- List of geology awards
