= Xie Jia Rong =

谢家荣 or 謝家榮 may refer to:

- Tse Ka Wing (born 1999), Hong Kong professional footballer
- Xie Jiarong (1897–1966), Chinese geologist
