= Donald F. Sangster =

Canadian geologist

Donald F. Sangster is a Canadian economic geologist. He has worked for the Geological Survey of Canada.

Sangster was president of the Society of Economic Geologists in 1994.

== Awards ==
- 1984, The Society of Economic Geologists Silver Medal
- 1998, awarded the Logan Medal by the Geological Association of Canada

== Selected publications ==
- Sangster, D.F., 1968, Some chemical features of lead-zinc deposits in carbonate rocks: Canada Geological Survey Paper 68–39, 17 p.
- Sangster, D.and Leach, D.L., 1995, Evidence for a genetic link between SEDEX and MVT deposits, in Leach, D.L. and Goldhaber, M.B., eds., Extended Abstracts, International Field Conference on Carbonate-hosted Lead-Zinc deposits, St. Louis Missouri, June 1–4, p. 260-263
- Donald F. Sangster (2002): The role of dense brines in the formation of vent-distal sedimentary- exhalative (SEDEX) lead-zinc deposits: field and laboratory evidence. Mineralium Deposita 37: 149-157
