= J. Willis Ambrose =

Canadian geologist (1904–1974)

- Born: John Willis Ambrose; 1904; Pincher Creek, Canada
- Died: 1974 (aged 62–63); Kingston, Ontario, Canada
- Education: Stanford University; Yale University
- Scientific career
- Fields: Geology
- Institutions: Queen's University at Kingston

John Willis Ambrose Ph.D. (1904 – 1974) was the first President of the Geological Association of Canada in 1947.

== Early life ==
Ambrose grew up in southwestern Alberta.

== Education ==
Ambrose obtained a B.A. from Stanford University in 1932 and a Ph.D. from Yale University in 1935.

== Career ==
Ambrose spent his career exploring geology in Canada. Between 1945 and 1948, he lived in Toronto, but was a Special Lecturer at Queen's University in Kingston, Ontario. In 1948, he moved to Kingston and joined Queen's full-time. He served as head of their geology department from 1962 until 1968. Ambrose retired in 1973.

== Legacy ==
The Geological Association of Canada honours Ambrose annually by awarding the Ambrose Medal to an individual for sustained dedicated service to the Canadian earth science community.
