= Mika McKinnon =

Canadian geophysicist

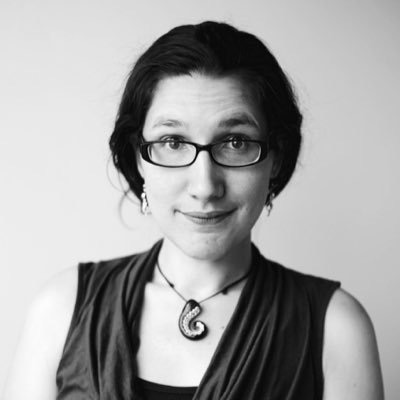
- Education: University of California, Santa Barbara; The University of British Columbia
- Known for: Disaster research, Stargate
- Scientific career
- Fields: Geophysics, Disaster Research, Science Communication
- Workplaces: SETI Institute; FEMA; Gizmodo; Natural Resources Canada
- Thesis: Landslide runout: statistical analysis of physical characteristics and model parameters (2010)
- Academic advisors: Oldrich Hungr
- Website: Website

Mika McKinnon is a Canadian field geophysicist, disaster researcher, and science communicator. She is a co-investigator of the Southwest Research Institute's Project ESPRESSO and was a science adviser to the science fiction television series Stargate Atlantis and Stargate Universe.

== Education and early career ==
In 2000, she was a student in the astronomy program of the Summer Science Program and later served on its board and as a guest lecturer.

McKinnon received her Bachelor of Science in Physics from the University of California, Santa Barbara in 2005, attending the College of Creative Studies. There, she re-launched the Society of Physics Students chapter and led a student colloquium on science in fiction.

She received her Master of Science in geophysics from the University of British Columbia in 2010. Her graduate work was about assessing and managing risk of landslides using statistical models to map their physical characteristics to better predict landslide runout and reduce the number of casualties and the extent of the damage.

While looking for work after graduation, during a hiring freeze by the Canadian government, she discovered women in her field were being hired because they could be paid less than men – which contributed to her vocal support for women and minorities in science.

== Research career ==
McKinnon's research interests are in disaster management, preparedness, and communication, working at the intersection of scientific research, advocacy and policy. In policy, she uses expertise in both science and communication to teach science to disaster managers, revising Federal Emergency Management Agency's (FEMA) science curriculum for emergency managers as a contractor and working on several projects with Natural Resources Canada.

McKinnon is a co-investigator of Project ESPRESSO, lending her expertise in terrestrial landslides and hazard mapping towards the project's goal of characterizing extraterrestrial target surfaces (asteroids, comets, and moons) and reducing other operational risks for robots and humans in space exploration. The project, which represents a consortium of seven partner institutions, was proposed in response to NASA's 2016 call for Solar System Exploration Research Virtual Institute nodes, and is one of four selected projects resulting from that call. She holds a joint appointment at the SETI Institute, one of ESPRESSO's partner institutions.

== Science communication ==
McKinnon earned the 2022 E. R. Ward Neale Medal, for sustained outstanding efforts in sharing earth science with Canadians, from the Geological Association of Canada.

McKinnon began her science communication efforts as a Master's student at UBC, after answering a call from the producers of the television show Stargate: Atlantis for a physicist who could help with accurate scientific justifications for the show's science fiction plots. After graduation, she pursued a career in science communication that included popular science writing and continuing her consulting role on the television shows Stargate: Atlantis and Stargate: Universe. More recently, McKinnon has consulted on Doomsday: 10 Ways the World Will End, No Tomorrow, Madam Secretary, and Star Trek: Discovery. In a profile with her alma mater, UCSB, she says that her interest in communication stemmed from the media's misrepresentation of a major landslide in the Pacific Northwest.

She was a contributing editor for Gawker Media, providing coverage on popular science topics for io9 and later became a science writer for Gizmodo. Her bylines cover topics including space exploration, dinosaur discovery, the convergence of science and art, and disaster preparedness. Her writing is in publications including Wired UK, Smithsonian magazine, Ars Technica, and Astronomy.

She volunteers for the National Academy of Sciences Science & Entertainment Exchange, providing subject matter expertise to the entertainment industry for more accurate depictions of science in the media.
