= Walter A. Bell =

Canadian geologist (1889–1969)

- Born: January 4, 1889; St. Thomas, Ontario, Canada
- Died: 1969 (aged 79–80); Pictou County, Nova Scotia, Canada
- Education: Queen's University; Yale University
- Known for: Carboniferous stratigraphy Paleobotany; Paleontology
- Awards: Logan Medal (1965)
- Scientific career
- Fields: Geology
- Workplaces: Geological Survey of Canada
- Author abbrev. (botany): W.A.Bell

Walter Andrew Bell (January 4, 1889 – 1969) was a Canadian geologist. He worked for the Geological Survey of Canada for over 40 years and authored or co-authored 70 publications. Most of them concerning Carboniferous stratigraphy, paleobotany and paleontology of Atlantic Canada. He also contributed significantly to central and western Canadian Mesozoic and Cenozoic paleobotany. His work provided support for the theory of continental drift.

== Early life ==
Bell was born to Scottish Presbyterian parents in St. Thomas, Ontario. He attended Queen's University in Kingston, Ontario, where he specialized in Geological Engineering. In 1911, he obtained a MSc in Geology from Yale University.

== Career ==
In 1911, Bell began his work with the Geological Survey of Canada examining the Carboniferous plants of Joggins near the Bay of Fundy. His scientific work was interrupted by World War I. From 1916 to 1919, he served with the Royal Regiment of Canadian Artillery and fought at Ypres, Vimy and Arras. After the war, Bell stayed in England for several months independently examining British fossils before returning to his studies at Yale. In 1920, he received his PhD with distinction.

After school he returned to the Geological Survey of Canada full-time. He concentrated his research on the structure, stratigraphy and palaeontology of the Lower Carboniferous Horton and Windsor groups of Nova Scotia. Bell was not a believer in the theory of continental drift, but his findings of the fossil plants proved to be well-known European species, thus becoming the foundation for the modern plate tectonics framework of the Maritimes.

Bell's 1949 publication on fossil plants from Alberta was expansive as Bell was able to supplement his own collections with those collected 50 years earlier by Dawson, Selwyn, and Tyrrell.

In 1950, Bell was promoted from Assistant Palaeobotanist to Director. As Director he encouraged and strengthened paleontological and stratigraphic studies. In 1953, Bell allowed George Hanson to take over as Director. In the final seven years before his death, his publications included 220 illustrated plates of fossil plants from across Canada.

In 1969, Bell died. He was buried at Alma, Pictou County, Nova Scotia.

== Legacy ==
In 1965, he was awarded the Geological Association of Canada's highest honour, the Logan Medal.

In 1968 the Saint Mary's University Geology Society was founded as the W.A Bell Geology Club. Subsequently, the name was changed to the D.Hope-Simpson Geology Club, in honour of the first chairperson of the Geology Department, Dr. David Hope-Simpson.

In 1995, the Walter A. Bell Memorial Symposium has held in North Sydney.

== Often cited papers ==
- Bell, W. A., 1957, Flora of the Upper Cretaceous Nanaimo Group of Vancouver Island, British Columbia: Geological Survey of Canada Memoir
