= Albrecht-Penck-Medaille =

Geology award

The Albrecht-Penck-Medaille is a scientific award of the Deutsche Quartärvereinigung (German Quaternary Union), given to an individual who made outstanding contributions in the fields of Quaternary science. The award is named after German geomorphologist Albrecht Penck (1858–1945).

== Laureates Albrecht-Penck-Medaille ==
Source: German Quaternary Association

- 1958: Henri Breuil, Franz Firbas, Rudolf Grahmann, Raimund von Klebelsberg, Paul Woldstedt
- 1962: Knud Jessen, Władysław Szafer
- 1964: Carl Troll
- 1966: Richard F. Flint, Alfred Rust
- 1968: Karl Gripp, Julius Büdel
- 1970: Konrad Richter
- 1972: André Cailleux, Waldo H. Zagwijn
- 1974: Raijmund Galon, Hans Graul
- 1978: J. K. Iwanowa, Gerald Richmond
- 1980: Vojen Loek, Martin Schwarzbach
- 1982: Julius Fink, Ingo Schaefer, Harry Godwin
- 1985: Max Welten, Erich Schönhals
- 1986: Karl Brunnacker
- 1988: Aleksis Dreimanis, Richard G. West
- 1990: Lothar Eissmann, Helmut Müller
- 1992: Hans Poser
- 1994: Arno Semmel, Heinz Kliewe, Alfred Jahn
- 1996: Hans-Jürgen Beug
- 1998: Frans Gullentops, Gerd Lüttig, J. E. Mojski
- 2000: René Handtke, Helmut Heuberger, Samuel Wegmüller
- 2002: Herbert Liedtke, Werner Schulz
- 2004: Karl-Ernst Behre
- 2006: Horst Hagedorn, Mebus A. Geyh
- 2008: Hermann Jerz, Dirk van Husen
- 2010: Klaus-Dieter Meyer, Hansjörg Streif
- 2012: Christian Schüchter, Charles Turner
- 2014: Ruth Drescher-Schneider, Klaus-Dieter Jäger

== Laureates DEUQUA Verdienst-Medaille ==
- 2020 Philip Gibbard
- 2020 Jürgen Ehlers
- 2022 Susan Ivy-Ochs
- 2024 Achim Brauer

== See also ==
- List of geology awards
