= Nick Eyles =

English geologist and professor (born 1952)

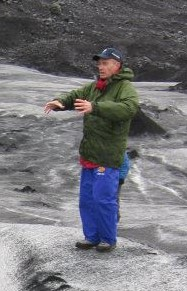
- Born: 1952 (age 73–74); London, England
- Education: Memorial University of Newfoundland; University of East Anglia
- Awards: E. R. Ward Neale Medal (2015)
- Scientific career
- Workplaces: University of Toronto
- Thesis: Facies of Supraglacial Sedimentation on Temperate Valley Glaciers (1978)

Nick Eyles is an English geologist. He has been Professor of Geology at the University of Toronto since 1982.

== Early life ==
Eyles was born in London, England in 1952. He attended Dartford Grammar School. He completed his bachelor's degree at University of Leicester and worked briefly at the Natural History Museum in London. He graduated from Memorial University of Newfoundland with an MSc under the supervision of Bob Rogerson and Roger Slatt. He completed his PhD at the University of East Anglia in 1978 under the supervision of Geoffrey Boulton.

== Professional career ==
Eyles began his teaching career at University of Newcastle-Upon-Tyne. He moved to Canada in 1980 and began teaching geology at University of Toronto Scarborough campus in 1982. His research interest is glacial geology and environmental urban geology. He is an author for the award-winning Rock series of books, including Toronto Rocks, Ontario Rocks, Canada Rocks: The Geologic Journey, Canadian Shield - The Rocks that Made Canada and Road Rocks - Geological Wonders of Ontario. For seven months in 2009-2010, he worked in the filming of the five-part documentary series Geologic Journey II for CBC Television's The Nature of Things. The documentary series was nominated for three Gemini Awards, including best documentary and best writing.

He was awarded the McNeil Medal of the Royal Society of Canada in 2013 and the E. R. Ward Neale Medal by the Geological Association of Canada in 2015. He also holds a Doctor of Science degree from University of Leicester.

== Personal life ==
Eyles is married to his wife Carolyn, also a geology professor but teaching at McMaster University. They have one son and one daughter.
