= William Fyfe (geochemist) =

New Zealand geologist and geochemist

William Sefton Fyfe
- Born: 4 June 1927; Ashburton, New Zealand
- Died: 11 November 2013 (aged 86); London, Ontario, Canada
- Occupation: Geologist

William Sefton Fyfe, CC FRSC FRS FRSNZ (4 June 1927 – 11 November 2013) was a New Zealand geologist and Professor Emeritus in the department of Earth Sciences at the University of Western Ontario. He is widely considered among the world's most eminent geochemists.

== Life ==
Born in Ashburton, New Zealand, he received his BSc degree in 1948, his MSc degree in 1949, and his PhD degree in 1952 all from the University of Otago, where he taught in the Geology department as a lecturer. He performed research at the University of California, Los Angeles and the University of California, Berkeley. He was a professor at Berkeley, Imperial College London and the University of Manchester before arriving at the University of Western Ontario in 1972. From 1986 until 1990 he was dean of science at the University of Western Ontario.

== Honours and awards ==
- From 1952 to 1954, Fulbright Scholar (Geology)
- In 1962 and 1983, he was a Guggenheim Fellow
- In 1969 he was elected a Fellow of the Royal Society
- Fellow of the Royal Society of Canada
- In 1970 he was elected an Honorary Fellow of the Royal Society of New Zealand.
- In 1981 he was awarded the Geological Association of Canada's highest honour, the Logan Medal.
- In 1985 he was awarded the Royal Society of Canada's Willet G. Miller Medal.
- In 1989 he was made a Companion of the Order of Canada.
- In 1989 he was awarded an honorary doctoral degree of science, from the Memorial University.
- In 1990 he was awarded an "honoris causa" doctoral degree from the University of Lisbon
- In 1990 he was awarded the Geological Society of America's Arthur L. Day Medal.
- In 1992 he was awarded the Natural Sciences and Engineering Research Council (NSERC) Canada Gold Medal for Science and Engineering.
- In 1994 he was awarded an honorary doctoral degree of science, from the Saint Mary's University, Halifax.
- In 1995 he was awarded honorary doctoral degrees of science, from the University of Otago and the University of Western Ontario.
- In 1995, he was awarded the Roebling Medal of the Mineralogical Society of America.
- In 2000 he was awarded the Geological Society's Wollaston Medal.
- In 2006 he was awarded an honorary doctoral degree of science, from the University of Alberta
- Asteroid 15846 Billfyfe is named in his honour
