= Syed Mahmood Naqvi =

Indian geochemist (1941–2009)

- Born: 28 August 1941; Amroha, United Provinces, British India
- Died: 4 September 2009 (aged 68); Hyderabad, Andhra Pradesh, India
- Education: Aligarh Muslim University, India
- Known for: Development in Geochemistry Science in India and Precambrian Geology of South India
- Scientific career
- Fields: Geochemistry and Precambrian Geology
- Workplaces: National Geophysical Research Institute (NGRI); CSIR

Syed Mahmood Naqvi (28 August 1941 — 4 September 2009) was an Indian Earth scientist specialising in geochemistry at the National Geophysical Research Institute (NGRI) in Hyderabad. In a four-decade career, from the 1960s through 2000s, he was the recipient of numerous awards, scientific as well as humanitarian, and served as Fellow of the Association of Applied Geochemists, Indian Geophysical Union, Andhra Pradesh Academy of Sciences and Indian National Science Academy (INSA) as well as vice-president of the Geological Society of India, the Geological Mining and Metallurgical Society of India and the Indian Society of Applied Geochemists (ISAG).

== Education ==
A native of the town of Amroha in northwestern Uttar Pradesh, Syed Mahmood Naqvi received his school and university education in Amroha and Aligarh, and moved to Hyderabad in 1964, upon being appointed as a research scientist at NGRI on 9 November. Becoming a member of the Geochemistry group, he obtained his Ph.D. in 1969/70, upon completing his thesis on the "structure, petrology, geochemistry, gravity field and tectonics of the central part of the Chitradurga Schist Belt, Dharwar Craton".

== Professional career ==
In his 39 years of active service with the NGRI, Mahmood Naqvi rose steadily through the cadre, serving as Acting Director of the institute from February to October 2001 and retiring with title of Scientist G in 2003. He remained loyal to the Council of Scientific and Industrial Research (CSIR) and did not leave it even when offered a professorship by his alma mater, Aligarh Muslim University (AMU).

In 1964, NGRI was mostly engaged in geophysical research, and Mahmood Naqvi was initially assigned to work with a team of geophysists, led by the eminent authority on mechanical engineering, M. N. Qureshi, in preparing a gravity map of India. However, he soon found his own niche. With the encouragement and support of NGRI director Hari Narain, as well as that of the head of his own division, Dr. Qureshi, Mahmood Naqvi initiated, as part of his Ph.D. project, the first systematic geological/geochemical studies at NGRI. Upon receiving his doctorate from AMU in 1970 and, over the following 35 years, he continued to explore the Precambrian Geology of South India by generating and interpreting diverse geochemical data. Since NGRI, during the 1960s, did not have the facilities required for such high-level research, he applied his entire efforts towards funding and building at the institute state-of-the-art geochemistry laboratories which have continued to meet analytical needs of a large number of research organizations and universities in India. He also established linkages with some leading geochemists outside the country and, among many other projects, led, with John A. Rogers of the University of North Carolina, Chapel Hill, a highly praised Indo-US collaborative programme on Precambrians of South India.

Mahmood Naqvi contributed immensely to human resource development in geochemistry by guiding over two dozen Ph.D. research students, most of whom have subsequently risen to occupy high positions in academic/research institutions and industry. Following superannuation in 2001, in his capacity as CSIR Emeritus as well as INSA Senior Scientist at NGRI, and despite failing health, he devoted his remaining years to research and authorship of several books, making this final period of his life one of his scientifically most productive.

Syed Mahmood Naqvi died in Hyderabad one week past his 68th birthday.

S.M. Naqvi Gold Medal was instituted in the name of outstanding scientist late Dr. S.M. Naqvi who contributed extensively in the field of Geology. He was associated with the Society in various capacities till his death in September 2009. Dr. S.M Naqvi Gold Medal will be awarded once in two years to a scientist below the age of 60 years for outstanding contributions in any field of Indian Geology.

== Research achievements ==
During a research career spanning nearly 45 years, Mahmood Naqvi made many outstanding contributions to earth sciences. These include:

1. Recognition and early description of the oldest crustal nucleus in Dharwar Craton around the Holenarsipur schist belt;
2. Importance of horizontal and plate tectonics in the Meso- and Neo-Archaean;
3. Identification, petrogenetic and tectonic characterization of a variety of rock types from the Archaean greenstone belts of southern India such as ultramafic komatiites, high-Mg basalts, anorthosites, boninites, adakites, Nb-rich basalts, grey-wakes, banded iron and manganese formations, the distinct phases and types of the TTG gneisses and granitoides;
4. Evidence for Archaean life;
5. Studies on Precambrian metallogeny such as gold mineralization in different geological environments within the Kolar, Ramgiri, Hutti and Gadag fields as well as in the banded iron formations at numerous localities both in southern India and Madagascar and the base metal deposits at Ingaldhal and Kalyadi.

Apart from catapulting the Dharwar Craton onto the canvas of global Precambrian terranes, Mahmood Naqvi's studies contributed new dimensions and leads toward unraveling several basic problems in Precambrian geology especially the relevance of uniformitarianism and paradigms such as plate tectonics to the early geologic history of the earth. He strongly advocated an early beginning of modern-style plate tectonics as far back in time as the Neo-Archean (2700 million years). He strived relentlessly to obtain critical evidences in the rock record of southern India to demonstrate his crust evolution model. His approach in this journey was holistic encompassing a range of earth processes involving interactions among atmosphere, hydrosphere and lithosphere in space and deep time.

== Awards and honours ==
- Gold Medal of the Geological Society of India (1978)
- Shanti Swarup Bhatnagar Prize in Earth Sciences (1983)
- Andhra Pradesh State Council for Science and Technology (APCOST) Award (1986)
- Taqi Hadi Award (1992)
- Amroha Gavrav (1994)
- Decennial Award of the Indian Geophysical Union (2001)
- Roll of Honour, Bundelkhand University (2005)
- Excellence Award from the Friendship Forum of India, New Delhi (2005)
- Lifetime Achievement – National Mineral Award for Excellence (2006).
- The S.M. Naqvi Gold Medal will be awarded biennially by the Geological Society of India in his honour. (2013)

== Sources ==
- "Obituary". Journal of the Geological Society of India. Volume 74 (Number 4) October 2009, pp. 531–2. DOI 10.1007/s12594-009-0160-3. Springer India, in co-publication with Geological Society of India. ISSN 0016-7622 (Print) ISSN 0974-6889 (Online. http://drs.nio.org/drs/handle/2264/4133. http://drs.nio.org/drs/bitstream/2264/4133/1/Biogr_Memoirs_Fellow_INSA_38_75.pdf
