= Norford =

Norford is a surname. Notable people with the surname include:

- Brian Norford (born 1932), British-Canadian geologist and paleontologist
- Donald Norford, Bermudian cricketer
- Patricia Norford (born 1932), Australian fencer
- William Norford (1715–1793), English medical practitioner and writer
