= Lithoprobe =

Lithoprobe was a Canadian national geoscience research project funded by the Natural Sciences and Engineering Research Council from 1984 to 2005, and one of the largest geoscientific research programs in Canadian history. The project aimed to research and map the lithosphere structure and composition, and its findings were used by scientists as well as petroleum and mining companies. By the end of the project, Lithoprobe had employed more than 1,000 scientists.

The name "Lithoprobe" is derived from "probing the lithosphere". The project used 20-tonne trucks, called vibroseis trucks and nicknamed "dancing elephants," that forced seismic waves beneath the Earth to generate geological and historical data, allowing researchers to glean information from at least 80 kilometers beneath the Earth's surface.

== History ==
The concept of Lithoprobe was proposed at a 1981 meeting sponsored by Canada's Natural Sciences and Engineering Research Council, and the project itself launched in 1984. It was jointly funded by the Natural Sciences and Engineering Research Council and the Geological Survey of Canada.

== Notable contributors ==
- Charlotte E. Keen
- Richard Lee Armstrong
- Ronald M. Clowes, Director (1987)
- Hu Gabrielse
- Thomas Edvard Krogh (1991–1996)
- James Monger
- John Oliver Wheeler, lobbied for establishment of the project, chairman of steering committee (two years)
- Harold Williams
