= Raymond A. Price =

Canadian geologist (1933–2024)

Dr. Raymond A. Price
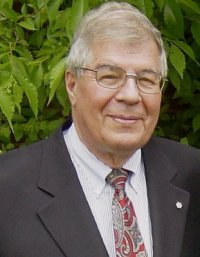
- Born: March 25, 1933; Winnipeg, Manitoba, Canada
- Died: October 16, 2024 (aged 91); Kingson, Ontario, Canada
- Education: University of Manitoba; Princeton University
- Known for: Structural geology Radioactive waste disposal
- Awards: Penrose Medal; Logan Medal; R.J.W. Douglas Medal; Major Edward D'Ewes Fitzgerald Coke Medal; Leopold-von-Buch-Plakette
- Scientific career
- Fields: Geology
- Workplaces: Geological Survey of Canada; Queen's University

Raymond Alexander Price, OC FRSC (March 25, 1933 – October 16, 2024) was a Canadian geologist. He has used his research on the structure and tectonics of North America’s lithosphere to produce extensive geological maps. He has also provided guidance for nuclear fuel waste disposal and reports on the human contribution to Global warming.

Price was born in Winnipeg, Manitoba, Canada. He obtained his BSc in Geology from the University of Manitoba in 1955. He completed two more degrees in geology at Princeton University; an A.M. in 1957 and a PhD in 1958.

== Career ==
In 1958, Price began working in the Petroleum Geology Section of the Geological Survey of Canada. For the next ten years he studied the structure and tectonics of the Cordillera of western Canada, mapping its geological features.

In 1968, he left the Geological Survey to work at Queen's University as an associate professor. Between 1972 and 1977, he was the head of the Department of Geological Sciences. From 1978 to 1980, Price was a Killam Research Fellow.

From 1980 to 1985, Price was the president of the International Lithosphere Program.

In 1981, Price returned to the Geological Survey to be director-general. He held that position as well as the assistant deputy minister in the Department of Energy, Mines and Resources in Ottawa for the next 7 years. From 1988 to 1998, Price was a professor at Queen’s University. From 1989 to 1990, he was president of the Geological Society of America.

From 1998, Price was professor emeritus of Geological Sciences and Geological Engineering at Queen's.

== Research ==
Price’s structural geology and tectonic mapping of the southern Canadian Rocky Mountains provided new insights on the evolution of the Cordilleran foreland thrust and fold belt in Canada. He has also researched the role of science in public policy development, nuclear fuel waste disposal, earth system science, and the human dimensions of global change.

== Affiliations ==
- Fellow, Royal Society of Canada, since 1972
- Foreign Associate, US National Academy of Sciences, since 1988
- Fellow, American Association for the Advancement of Science, since 1997
- Fellow, Geological Society of America
- Distinguished fellow, Geological Association of Canada, since 1995
- Professional engineer, member of Professional Engineers of Ontario
- Honorary member, Canadian Society of Petroleum Geologists, since 1996
- Honorary foreign fellow by the European Union of Geosciences, since 1989
- Member, American Geophysical Union
- Member, American Association of Petroleum Geologists

== Honours and awards ==
- 2010, awarded the Massey Medal by the Royal Canadian Geographical Society
- 2003, made an Officer of the Order of Canada
- 1998, invited to be the John P. Buwalda Lecturer by the California Institute of Technology
- 1997, awarded the Michel T. Halbouty Human Needs Award by the American Association of Petroleum Geologists
- 1993, invited to be the Muan Distinguished Lecturer by Pennsylvania State University
- 1990, invited to be the Herzberg Lecturer by Carleton University, Ottawa
- 1989, presented with a Doctor of Science (honoris causa) by Memorial University of Newfoundland
- 1989, awarded the Major Edward D'Ewes Fitzgerald Coke Medal by the Geological Society of London, England
- 1988, awarded the Leopold von Buch Medal by the Deutsche Geologische Gesellschaft, Germany
- 1988, invited to be the D. F. Hewett Lecturer by Lehigh University, Bethlehem, Pennsylvania
- 1988, made an Officier de l'Ordre des Palmes Académiques, France
- 1987, presented with a Doctor of Science (honoris causa) by Carleton University
- 1985, awarded the Logan Medal by the Geological Association of Canada
- 1984, awarded the R. J. W. Douglas Medal by the Canadian Society of Petroleum Geologists
- 1981, judged to have written the Best Technical Paper by the Rocky Mountain Association of Geologists, Denver
- 1980–1981, recognized as distinguished lecturer by the Canadian Society of Petroleum Geologists
- 1978–1980, awarded a Killam Senior Research Fellow
- 1969, recognized as distinguished lecturer by the Canadian Institute of Mining and Metallurgy
- 1957, awarded a Procter Fellow by Princeton University
- 1955, awarded the Gold Medal in Sciences by the University of Manitoba

== Select publications ==
- Price, R.A., 1956. "The base of the Cambrian system in the southeastern Cordillera of Canada". Canadian Mining and Metallurgical Bulletin, Vol. 49, pp. 765–771.
- Norris, D.K., and Price, R.A. 1956. "Coal Mountain, British Columbia". Geological Survey of Canada Map 4-1956.
- Price, R.A., 1959. "Flathead, British Columbia and Alberta". Geological Survey of Canada Map 1-1959.
- Price, R.A. and Mountjoy, E.W., 1970. "The geological structure of the Southern Canadian Rockies between Bow and Athabasca Rivers, -- A progress report", in "A structural cross-section of the Southern Canadian Cordillera", J.O. Wheeler, editor, Geological Association of Canada, Special Paper Number 6, pp. 7–25.
