= Grant Mossop =

Canadian geologist

Grant Mossop (1948 – 7 October 2005) was a geologist from Canada. He earned a B.Sc. in 1970 and an M.Sc. in 1971 from the University of Calgary followed by a Ph.D. in geology from the University of London. He served as the Director of the Institute of Sedimentary and Petroleum Geology, Geological Survey of Canada Calgary. A graduate scholarship in his name was established in 2009.

He was awarded the Ambrose Medal of the Geological Association of Canada in 1995.
