= Ambrose Medal =

Award presented by the Geological Association of Canada

The J. Willis Ambrose Medal is an award presented by the Geological Association of Canada, and is named after the association's first President, J. Willis Ambrose. It is awarded annually, unless no suitable candidate is identified, "to an individual for sustained dedicated service to the Canadian earth science community."

== Recipients ==
Source: Geological Association of Canada

- 1986 - E. R. Ward Neale
- 1987 - Atholl Sutherland Brown
- 1988 - John G. Fyles
- 1989 - W. Glen E. Caldwell
- 1990 - Hubert Gabrielse
- 1991 - Chris R. Barnes
- 1992 - not awarded
- 1993 - Hugh C. Morris
- 1994 - Brian S. Norford
- 1995 - Grant D. Mossop
- 1996 - William A. Padgham
- 1997 - Alan V. Morgan
- 1998 - Nathaniel Westland Rutter
- 1999 - Aicha Achab
- 2000 - G. D. Williams
- 2001 - Denis St-Onge
- 2002 - Roger Macqueen
- 2003 - Mary-Claire Ward
- 2004 - Ian McIlreath
- 2005 - Godfrey S. Nowlan
- 2006 - Graham Williams
- 2007 - Robert F. Martin
- 2008 - Frank Blackwood
- 2009 - Ed Debicki
- 2010 - Brian Jones
- 2011 - Grant Abbott
- 2012 - John J. Clague
- 2013 - Simon Hanmer
- 2014 - Brendan Murphy
- 2015 - Sandra Barr
- 2016 - Scott Swinden
- 2017 - Stephen T. Johnston
- 2018 – Peter T. Bobrowsky
- 2019 - Carolyn Anglin
- 2020 - Joseph Hodych

== See also ==
- List of geology awards
