= Petr Černý =

Czech geologist

Petr Černý FRSC (8 January 1934 – 7 April 2018) was a mineralogy professor at the University of Manitoba.

Černý's studies focus on pegmatite. He is best known for his geological mapping of Bernic Lake, Manitoba in the 1970s. The site has since hosted several tantalum-lithium-caesium mines, for example the Tanco Mine.

== Honours ==
- 1991, made a fellow of the Royal Society of Canada
- 1991, bestowed an honorary doctorate by the University of Manitoba
- 1993, awarded the Logan Medal by the Geological Association of Canada
- the mineral cernyite was named in his honour
- elected an honorary member of the Learned Society of Czech Republic
- received a medal from the Asociacion Geologica Argentina
