= Andersons Cove Formation =

Geologic formation in Newfoundland, Canada

- Stratigraphic range: 573–549 Ma
- Type: Formation
- Unit of: Long Harbour Group

Lithology
- Primary: Siliciclastic

Location
- Region: Newfoundland
- Country: Canada
- Occurrence of the Andersons Cove Formation in southeastern Newfoundland

The Andersons Cove Formation is a formation which overlies the Belle Bay Formation in Newfoundland, Canada. In 2001, Engineering & Mining Journal reported that Celtic Minerals Ltd. had staked a claim to a parcel of land at Terrenceville Junction to "cover prospective stratigraphy of the Andersons Cove Formation".
