= Claude Hillaire-Marcel =

Canadian geologist

Claude Hillaire-Marcel FRSC (born April 1, 1944, in Salies-de-Béarn, Pyrénées-Atlantiques) is a Canadian geoscientist working in Quaternary research. He is known for his research on the environment, climate change, and oceanography. He is a Fellow of the Royal Society of Canada and professor at l'Université du Québec à Montréal.

== Early life and education ==
Hillaire-Marcel was born and educated in France. He received advanced degrees at the Sorbonne in 1968, and the University of Paris in 1979.

== Career ==
He moved to Canada and became a professor at l'Université du Québec à Montréal. From between 1970 and 2003, Claude Hillaire-Marcel authored or co-authored over 150 scientific papers. He supervised 20 doctoral dissertations and 37 M.Sc. and D.E.A. theses, and in addition he had 13 scientists working with him as postdoctoral fellows from Belgium, Canada, Denmark, France, Germany, Mexico, the UK and the U.S.

His early papers covered Pleistocene marine fauna and isostatic rebound near Montreal. Later he broadened his geographic scope to include Ungava Bay and Hudson Bay. In 1976, he began writing about oxygen and carbon isotopes. By 1980 he was involved in dating studies utilizing isotopes of uranium and thorium.

Between 1985 and 1991, Hillaire-Marcel participated in, or was chief scientist on various scientific marine expeditions, including six cruises on Canadian ships (CSS Dawson & CSS Hudson) and a cruise aboard the French research ship Marion-Dufresne in Greenland waters in 1999.

In 1994, a special issue of the Canadian Journal of Earth Sciences featured Labrador Sea studies. Nine of the 12 articles were co-authored by Claude Hillaire-Marcel. In 2001, he was lead author on a paper in Nature entitled "Absence of deep-water formation in the Labrador Sea during the last interglacial period", and he was one of several authors of an EOS article entitled "New Record Shows Pronounced Changes in Arctic Ocean Circulation and Climate".

Most of his work has been around the shores of Canada, but he has carried out field studies or been involved in research in Africa (Algeria, Burundi, Egypt, Ethiopia, Kenya, Libya, Mali, Niger, Tanzania and Tunisia, the Middle East (Israel and Syria, Latin America (Chile, Mexico, Peru, and Uruguay), and Europe (France, Greece and Spain (including the Balearic and Canary island.

Hillaire-Marcel performs editorial duties for GpQ, CJES and QSR.

Claude Hillaire-Marcel was the Founding Director (1981-1989, 1997–1999) of The Centre de recherche en géochimie et géodynamique, or GEOTOP. He served twice as Chairman of the Department of Earth Sciences at UQAM (1983-1985 and 1987–1989)

Hillaire- Marcel has held two endowed chairs: from 1989 to 2000 the Industrial Chair Hydro-Québec- NSERC-UQAM and from 2000 on the International Chair UNESCO.

Between 1977 and 2002 he co-authored 24 non-Quaternary scientific papers in the fields of agriculture, nutrition, and physical exercise. One involved testing the authenticity of maple syrup.

== Committee memberships ==
Claude Hillaire-Marcel served on the following committees; the Royal Society of Canada, Canadian Quaternary Association, International Union for Quaternary Research, Ocean Drilling Program, International Marine Global Change Study (IMAGES), the World Climate Research Program (WCRP), and the Joint Global Oceans Flux Studies (JGOFS).

He is a member of the Consultative Committee for the Environment of Hydro-Québec, the Canadian Scientific Committee for the Integrated ODP, the Scientific Committee of the Institut du Sahel, and the executive committee of Fonds québécois de la recherche sur la nature et les technologies (FONDS FCAR) and vice-president of the Sub-commission for the Americas of the INQUA Commission on Shorelines.

== Awards and Distinctions ==
- 1991- Made a Fellow of the Royal Society of Canada
- 2001- Awarded Prix Michel-Jurdant
- 2002- Received the prestigious Prix Marie-Victorin, the highest award in Quebec for scientific merit in the natural sciences and engineering.
- 2003- the Canadian Quaternary Association awarded him with the W.A. Johnston Medal
- 2005- Fellow of the American Association for the Advancement of Science
- 2006- Awarded the Logan Medal, the Geological Association of Canada's highest honour
