= Charlotte Keen =

Canadian geologist

Charlotte E. Keen
- Born: Halifax, Nova Scotia
- Education: Dalhousie University; University of Cambridge
- Known for: Seismology
- Scientific career
- Workplaces: Dalhousie University; Geological Survey of Canada; Bedford Institute of Oceanography

Charlotte E. Keen (née Davidson) is a Canadian geologist and professor emeritus at the Geological Survey of Canada. Her work focuses on the structure of the Earth's crust and the upper mantle using geophysical imaging and magnetic measurements. She was the first woman to go on a Canadian Survey Ship.

== Early life and education ==
Keen was born in Halifax, Nova Scotia. She attended elementary school in Ottawa and went to school at Lachine High School in Montreal. She studied at Dalhousie University, and earned her bachelor's degree in 1964 and master's degree in 1966.

In 1964 Keen became the first woman to go to sea on the Canadian Survey Ship Hudson. As a woman, Keen was technically not allowed to be on board, but was smuggled aboard with Frances Wagner in the Strait of Canso. She published her first Nature paper whilst still an undergraduate student. She moved to the United Kingdom, where she completed a PhD at the University of Cambridge and was one of the first two women members of her department.

During her doctoral studies, she investigated the Mid-Atlantic Ridge, and her thesis included the first demonstration of seismic refraction experiments near a ridge. At Cambridge, Keen worked with Drum Hoyle Matthews, who had recently discovered seafloor spreading. She quickly became an expert in plate tectonics. After completing her PhD, Keen joined the Atlantic Oceanography Lab of Energy, Mines and Resources in Dartmouth, Nova Scotia.

== Career ==
=== Research ===
In 1971, Keen was made a research scientist at the Geological Survey of Canada, eventually becoming the most senior research scientist. At this time, women were not formally allowed on Canadian Research Ships, which resulted in Keen and her boss raising the issue with the Ottawa Deputy Minister's Office. She became the first woman to legally work on a Canadian Survey Ship. Her early work considered the continental margins and sedimentary basins in the Pacific Ocean. She performed refraction measurements to study the seismic anisotropy in the upper mantle, showing that the maximum and minimum velocity was consistent with seafloor spreading. Alongside extensive studies of the Atlantic and Pacific Ocean, Keen used biostratigraphic and metamorphic data to analyse the exploratory wells around Labrador. She showed that the subsidence of basement followed similar depth-age curves to the oceanic lithosphere.

Keen developed thermal-mechanical models and applied them to rifted continental margins. She has studied the crystal structure of the continental margin of Eastern Canada. Keen was responsible for the development of the LITHOPROBE, the largest ever research science project in Canada. LITHOPROBE looked to investigate the geology and continental lithosphere of the ocean floor. In 1986 she was appointed the Head of Regional Reconnaissance at the Bedford Institute of Oceanography. Her research provided the scientific framework to interpret the petroleum geology of the region.

In 1992 Keen was featured in Claiming the Future: The Inspiring Lives of Twelve Canadian Women Scientists and Scholars, a book of biographies about Canadian women scientists. She retired from the Bedford Institute of Oceanography in 1998. Keen is an adjunct Professor at Dalhousie University.

=== Awards and honours ===
- 2014 - Discovery Centre Hall of Fame
- 2003 - Dalhousie University Honorary Doctoral Degree
- 1995 - Geological Association of Canada Distinguished Fellow
- 1995 - Canadian Geophysical Union Wilson Medal
- 1994 - Geological Society of America Woollard Award
- 1993 - Geological Association of Canada Michael J. Keen Medal in Marine Geosciences
- 1992 - Canadian Society of Exploration Geophysicists Honorary Member
- 1991 - Royal Society, Royal Society of Canada Canada–United Kingdom Rutherford Lecturer
- 1986 - American Geophysical Union Fellow
- 1980 - Royal Society of Canada Fellow
- 1979 - Geological Association of Canada Past President's Medal
- 1975 - Atlantic Provinces Inter-University Committee on the Sciences Young Scientist Medal
