= Anthony R. Barringer =

Canadian geologist (1925–2009)

- Born: October 20, 1925
- Died: August 15, 2009 (aged 83); Golden, Colorado, U.S.
- Education: Imperial College London
- Known for: Development of technology for mineral, oil and gas exploration
- Awards: Mining Hall of Fame; Logan Medal; Virgil Kauffman Gold Medal; Maurice Ewing Medal; Daniel C. Jackling Award
- Scientific career
- Fields: Geophysics
- Workplaces: Barringer Research Inc.

Anthony R. "Tony" Barringer (October 20, 1925 – August 15, 2009) was a Canadian geophysicist. He made numerous contributions to mineral exploration technology. His most famous work was the development of the INPUT airborne electromagnetic system, which has been credited in the discovery of tens of billions of dollars' worth of ore deposits.

Before beginning his university studies, Barringer served with the British Army in World War II. In 1948, he began attending the University of London. In 1951, he obtained a B.Sc. in economic geology from the university's Imperial College of Science and Technology. He obtained a PhD degree in 1954, from the same institution.

== Career ==
Barringer left the United Kingdom to accept a post in Toronto, Ontario, Canada with Selco Exploration as an exploration geologist. Eventually he was promoted to Manager of its Airborne and Technical Services division. At this time, he invented the INPUT (Induced Pulse Transient) airborne electromagnetic system and the equipment for a portable ground electromagnetic system. This technology uses one horizontal transmitter looped around a fixed-wing aircraft and a vertically suspended receiver loop about 120 meters behind the aircraft. The transmitter electromagnetic pulses are half sine wave shape of millisecond duration, the induced transient is picked up by the receiver coil; analysis of the received wave pattern when matched against a catalog of waves forms generated in the lab based upon analog scale modeling allows explorers to get a better understanding of the minerals in a rock formation, without extracting the rocks. The Society of Exploration Geophysicists said INPUT was "a meritorious technical achievement which has been instrumental in the discovery of many base metal deposits in a number of countries around the world."

In 1961, he formed a private company, Barringer Research Ltd. He was the President and major shareholder. Barringer continued to develop the airborne system and licenses its use to exploration companies. Major oil and mining companies depended on this remote-sensing technology for their exploration. It has been credited in the discovery of over 25 commercial ore deposits, representing tens of billions of dollars.

Barringer Research went public in 1967. Ten years later, Barringer moved to Denver, Colorado and brought the company's headquarters with him. He later became a citizen of the United States.

Barringer made numerous technical contributions to the mining industry, including a laser-induced fluorescence-based system used primarily in oil and gas exploration (FLUOROSCAN), correlation spectrometer used to measure atmospheric dispersions of various gases (COSPEC), an infrared remote sensor for atmospheric gases which has been used by NASA to measure the worldwide atmospheric distribution of carbon dioxide (GASPEC), two airborne conductivity mapping systems using very low frequency fields (E-phase and radiophase) and several particulate analyzers (COTRAN, SURTRACE, LASERTRACE and AIRTRACE). He has presented more than 80 technical papers and has been awarded more than 70 patents in Canada, the U.S., and other countries.

In 1989, Barringer officially retired. He died in Golden, Colorado at the age of 83.

== Honours and awards ==
- inducted into the Canadian Mining Hall of Fame by the Mining Association of Canada
- 1977, awarded the Logan Medal by the Geological Association of Canada
- 1980, awarded the Virgil Kauffman Gold Medal by the Society of Exploration Geophysicists
- 1985, awarded the Daniel C. Jackling Award by the American Association of Mining and Petroleum Engineers
