= Yves Fortier (geologist) =

Canadian geologist (1914–2014)

- Born: Yves Oscar Fortier; August 17, 1914; Quebec City, Quebec, Canada
- Died: August 19, 2014 (aged 100)
- Education: Séminaire de Québec; Laval University (BA); McGill University (MSc); Queen's University (BSc); Stanford University (PhD)
- Spouse: Trudy
- Children: 4
- Awards: Logan Medal, Massey Medal
- Scientific career
- Fields: Geology
- Workplaces: Geological Survey of Canada

Yves Oscar Fortier OC FRSC (August 17, 1914 – August 19, 2014) was a Canadian geologist.

== Early life ==
Fortier was born on August 17, 1914 in Quebec City.

He was educated at the Jesuit Séminaire de Québec. He went on to Laval University, obtaining a BA in 1936. One of his teachers, Fr. J.W. Laverdière, introduced Yves to geology. He entered Queen’s University in 1936 and chose the geology option in mining engineering area of study where he obtained a BSc in 1940. He obtained a MSc from McGill University in 1941. His PhD degree was conferred by Stanford University in 1946.

== Career ==
He was the director of the Geological Survey of Canada from 1964 to 1973. He led expeditions to the Canadian Arctic in the 1950s and 1960s which identified significant potential oil and gas resources.

== Personal life and death ==
Fortier had a wife Trudy, and had 2 sons, Georges and Marc, and 2 daughters Mimi and Claire.

He died at the age of 100 on August 19, 2014.

== Honours ==
- 1953 - Fellow of the Royal Society of Canada
- 1964 - Massey Medal, Royal Canadian Geographical Society
- 1974 - Logan Medal, Geological Association of Canada
- 1980 - Officer of the Order of Canada
- The mineral Yofortierite was named in his honor by Canadian geologist Guy Perrault, F.R.S. (1927–2002).
- The Yves Fortier Earth Science Journalism Award is also named in his honor.
