= Logan Medal =

Highest award of the Geological Association of Canada

There is also a Logan Medal of the arts, awarded by the Chicago Arts Institute.

The Logan Medal is the highest award of the Geological Association of Canada. Named after Sir William Edmond Logan, noted 19th-century Canadian geologist. It is presented annually to an individual for sustained distinguished achievement in Canadian earth science.

== Recipients ==
- 1964 - James Edwin Hawley
- 1965 - Walter A. Bell
- 1966 - Henry C. Gunning
- 1967 - James E. Gill
- 1968 - John Tuzo Wilson
- 1969 - James M. Harrison
- 1970 - Duncan R. Derry
- 1971 - Thomas Henry Clark
- 1972 - Robert F. Legget
- 1973 - Clifford H. Stockwell
- 1974 - Yves O. Fortier
- 1975 - Edward A. Irving
- 1976 - R. J. W. Douglas
- 1977 - Anthony R. Barringer
- 1978 - Aleksis Dreimanis
- 1979 - Raymond Thorsteinsson
- 1980 - Gerard V. Middleton
- 1981 - William S. Fyfe
- 1982 - Charles R. Stelck
- 1983 - John Oliver Wheeler
- 1984 - David W. Strangway
- 1985 - Raymond A. Price
- 1986 - Michael John Keen
- 1987 - Digby McLaren
- 1988 - Harold Williams
- 1989 - Thomas Edvard Krogh
- 1990 - Richard Lee Armstrong
- 1991 - J. Ross Mackay
- 1992 - Paul F. Hoffman
- 1993 - Petr Černý
- 1994 - Anthony J. Naldrett
- 1995 - Jan Veizer
- 1996 - Frank C. Hawthorne
- 1997 - Eric W. Mountjoy
- 1998 - Donald F. Sangster
- 1999 - Roger G. Walker
- 2000 - Hu Gabrielse
- 2001 - Stephen E. Calvert
- 2002 - James Monger
- 2003 - Fred Longstaffe
- 2004 - Stewart Blusson
- 2005 - Ronald M. Clowes
- 2006 - Claude Hillaire-Marcel
- 2007 - John J. Clague
- 2008 - James M. Franklin
- 2009 - Noel P. James
- 2010 - Christopher R. Barnes
- 2011 - Anthony E. Williams-Jones
- 2012 - Robert Kerrich
- 2013 - George Pemberton
- 2014 - Andrew Miall
- 2015 - Richard A.F. Grieve
- 2016 - Brian Jones
- 2017 - Roy Hyndman
- 2018 - Barbara Sherwood Lollar
- 2019 - Cees van Staal
- 2020 - Margot McMechan
- 2021 - Kurt Konhauser
- 2022 - J. Brendan Murphy
- 2023 - Sandra Kamo
- 2024 - Sandra Barr

Source: Geological Association of Canada

== See also ==
- List of geology awards
