= AAG Gold Medal =

Highest award given by the Association of Applied Geochemists

The AAG Gold Medal is the highest award given by the international Association of Applied Geochemists (AAG). It recognizes recipients' lifetime achievements, or significant contributions to geochemistry and its applications. The medal is minted with the name of the recipient and the year of the award from two troy ounces of silver bullion.

== Recipients ==
The following have received the gold medal:

Year	Recipient
1995	Charles Butt and Ray Smith
1999	Robert W. Boyle
2005	Gwendy Hall
2007	Xie Xuejing
2009	Gerry Govett
2011	Eion Cameron
2013	Clemens Reimann and Eric Hoffman
2014	Colin Dunn
2015	Ravi Anand
2016	Reijo Salminen
2017	Stu Averill
2019	Benedetto De Vivo
2020	Cheng Qiuming
2021	William K. Fletcher
2022	Robert G. Garrett
2023	Renguang Zuo

== See also ==
- List of geology awards
