= Yves Fortier Earth Science Journalism Award =

Journalism award

The Yves O. Fortier Earth Science Journalism Award is presented annually by the Geological Association of Canada to "a journalist who is a resident of Canada and who has been exceptionally effective in presenting one or more earth science stories during the previous 1-3 years in one of Canada's daily or weekly newspapers or periodicals." The award was established by and is named after Yves O. Fortier, a founding member of the Geological Association of Canada and a former director of the Geological Survey of Canada.

== Recipients ==
Source: GAC

- 2001 – Ed Struzik of the Edmonton Journal
- 2002 – Larry Pynn of the Vancouver Sun
- 2003 – Ed Struzik of the Edmonton Journal
- 2004 – Bob Burtt of the Waterloo Record
- 2005 – Peter Calamai of the Toronto Star
- 2006 – Margret Brady of the Ottawa Citizen
- 2007 – Colin Hunter (journalist) of Waterloo Record
- 2008 – Dominique Forget of Géographica (L'Actualité)
- 2009 – Marian Scott of The Gazette
- 2010 – Randy Boswell of CanWest News Service
- 2011 – Karissa Donkin and Hilary Paige Smith of The Telegraph
- 2012 – Edward Struzik of Edmonton Journal
- 2013 – Tom Spears of The Ottawa Citizen
- 2014 – Kate Lunau of Maclean's Magazine
- 2015 – Margaret Munro of Postmedia News
- 2016 – Ivan Semeniuk of The Globe and Mail
- 2017 – not awarded

== See also ==
- List of geology awards
- List of science communication awards
- Prizes named after people
