= Terrenceville Formation =

Geological formation in North America

- Stratigraphic range: Mississippian – Pennsylvanian
- Type: Formation

Lithology
- Primary: Non-marine conglomerate (siliciclastic)

Location
- Region: Newfoundland
- Country: Canada
- Occurrence of the Terrenceville Formation in southeastern Newfoundland

The Terrenceville Formation is a formation cropping out in Newfoundland. These formations are included in the 1995 publication of Geology of the Appalachian—Caledonian Orogen in Canada and Greenland which was edited by Harold Williams.
