= E. R. Ward Neale Medal =

The E. R. Neale Medal, named after E. R. Ward Neale, past Geological Association of Canada president, is awarded by the Geological Association of Canada to an individual for sustained outstanding efforts in sharing earth science with Canadians.

The award recognizes outstanding efforts to communicate and explain geoscience to the public through public lectures, print or electronic media articles, school visits, elementary and secondary school educational materials, field trips, science fairs, and other public communications. The medal is awarded annually, unless no suitable candidate is nominated.

== Recipients ==
Source: GAC

- 1995: Godfrey S. Nowlan
- 1996: Graham L. Williams
- 1997: Arthur F. King
- 1998: Alan V. Morgan
- 1999: P. Tremblay
- 2000: D. A. B. Pearson
- 2001: Howard V. Donohoe Jr.
- 2002: Bob Turner
- 2003: David Baird
- 2004: Peter Russell
- 2005: Fran Haidl
- 2006: John J. Clague
- 2007: Dixon Edwards
- 2008: Christy Vodden
- 2009: Eileen Van der Flier-Keller
- 2010: Jane Wynne
- 2011: Randall F. Miller
- 2012: John Calder
- 2013: Murray Roed
- 2014: Ben Gadd
- 2015: Nick Eyles
- 2016: Rob Fensome
- 2017: Guy Narbonne
- 2018: Mark Fenton
- 2019: Beth McLarty-Halfkenny (Carleton University)
- 2020: not awarded
- 2021: Kylie Williams
- 2022: Mika McKinnon
- 2023: Jeff Young
- 2024: Nick Zentner

== See also ==
- List of geology awards
