= Bancroft Award =

The Bancroft Award is an award of the Royal Society of Canada "given for publication, instruction, and research in the earth sciences that have conspicuously contributed to public understanding and appreciation of the subject".

The award was endowed in 1968 to honour her late husband by the wife of Joseph Austin Bancroft (1882–1957), formerly Dawson Professor at McGill University. It is normally awarded on a biennial basis and consists of a presentation scroll and a cash award of CAD $2,500.

== Recipients ==
- 1968 - John Tuzo Wilson, FRSC
- 1970 - David M. Baird, FRSC
- 1975 - E.R. Ward Neale, FRSC
- 1976 - Roger A. Blais
- 1978 - Frank Kenneth North
- 1980 - William W. Hutchison
- 1982 - Christopher R. Barnes, FRSC
- 1984 - Jack G. Souther
- 1986 - Derek York, FRSC
- 1990 - Steven D. Scott, FRSC
- 1992 - Godfrey S. Nowlan
- 1994 - Alan V. Morgan
- 1996 - Dale A. Russell
- 2000 - Jan Veizer, FRSC
- 2002 - John J. Clague, FRSC
- 2004 - William Richard Peltier, FRSC
- 2006 - David J. Dunlop, FRSC
- 2008 - Anthony E. Williams-Jones, FRSC
- 2010 - Frank C. Hawthorne
- 2014 - Guy Narbonne
- 2016 - Barbara Sherwood Lollar, FRSC
- 2018 - Michel Jébrak
- 2020 - Irena Creed, FRSC
- 2022 - Sandra M. Barr
- 2024 - Kurt Konhauser, FRSC
- 2026 - John Pomeroy

== See also ==
- List of geology awards
- List of geographers
- List of prizes named after people
- List of science and technology awards
