= Irena Creed =

Canadian hydrologist

- Education: University of Toronto (BS, MS, PhD)
- Scientific career
- Fields: Hydrology, Biogeochemistry, Watershed Sciences, Climate Change, Planetary health, Ecosystem Services
- Workplaces: University of Toronto, University of Saskatchewan, Western University, UNU Institute for Water, Environment and Health, Egerton University
- Thesis: Topographic regulation of nitrate-N export from catchments within an old-growth sugar maple forest in the Turkey Lakes Watershed, central Ontario, Canada Thesis.

Irena Creed is a Canadian hydrologist. She is a professor in the Department of Physical and Environmental Sciences at University of Toronto Scarborough in Toronto, Canada, and was formerly the University's Vice-President for Research and Innovation, the Associate Vice-President for Research at the University of Saskatchewan, and the Executive Director of the University of Saskatchewan's School of Environment and Sustainability in Saskatoon, Canada. Creed studies the impacts of global climate change on ecosystem functions and services, often focusing on the hydrology of freshwater wetlands and catchments.

== Education ==
Creed did her undergraduate and graduate studies at the University of Toronto. She graduated with honors with a Bachelor of Science in Zoology with a minor in Botany. She then went on to pursue a Master of Science in Botany and Environmental Sciences, and a Doctorate of Philosophy in Geography. Creed then became a postdoctoral fellow at the University of Alberta, where she studied forest management strategies and their impacts on surrounding ecosystems.

== Career and research ==
From 1998 to 2017, Creed was a professor at Western University in London, Canada in the Biology and Geography departments. From 2007 to 2017, Creed held a Canada Research Chair in Watershed Sciences at Western University. From 2008 to 2009, she served as the Acting Director of Western University's Centre for Environment and Sustainability. From 2013 to 2017, she served as the Associate Chair of Research in the Biology department of Western University. From 2014 to 2017, she served as the Director of the Africa Institute at Western University, of which she was a Founding Fellow.

In 2017, Creed became a professor at the University of Saskatchewan's School of Environment and Sustainability and the School's Executive Director. In 2019, she became the Associate Vice-President for Research at the University of Saskatchewan before taking the position of Vice-Principal for Research and Innovation at University of Toronto Scarborough in 2021, which she held until 2024. Creed remains an adjunct professor at Western University and the University of Saskatchewan and also holds adjunct appointments at the United Nations University Institute for Water, Environment, and Health and the Department of Environmental Sciences at Egerton University in Nakuru, Kenya.

From 2013 to 2015, Creed was awarded a Visiting Female Professorship at Umeå University in Umeå, Sweden. In 2019, she was awarded an Honorary Doctorate in Agricultural Sciences from the Swedish University of Agricultural Sciences in Uppsala, Sweden, and was elected as a Fellow to the Royal Society of Canada (RSC). She was a recipient of the RSC's Bancroft Award in 2020 for outstanding contributions in earth sciences. In 2022, Creed was elected a Fellow of the American Geophysical Union. From 2022 to 2024, she held the distinguished Wallenberg Professorship awarded by the Royal Swedish Academy of Agriculture and Forestry for contributions to the recognition and promotion of wetlands as nature-based climate solutions.

Creed's research is based in planetary health, both locally and globally. Specifically, Creed focuses on hydrology and the impacts of water on surrounding terrestrial and aquatic ecosystems. Her work is often focused on involving water more in discussions of forest management.

Creed has served on numerous Canadian and international advisory boards, panels, delegations and committees, including for the Canadian Wetlands Roundtable, the Government of Alberta Ministry of Environment and Protected Areas, Alberta Innovates, the International Joint Commission, and United Nations High-Level Political Forums on Sustainable Development. She served as a panel member in an American Geophysical Union (AGU) discussion at the 2023 United Nations Climate Change Conference (COP28). From 2019 to 2021, Creed served as the Special Advisor to the President on Sustainability at the University of Saskatchewan where she helped prepare the University´s Institutional Sustainability Strategy, which was approved in 2021.

Creed has led numerous projects involving collaborations with Canadian and international researchers, including several funded by the Natural Sciences and Engineering Research Council. From 2010 to 2015, she led researchers from the United States and Canada in the Great Lakes Futures Project, a multi-institutional effort to make predictions on possible futures of share water resources in the Great Lakes basin and to help develop strategies for water resource management. From 2013 to 2018, Creed led a collaboration of Canadian researchers and industrial and government partners in the Boreal 2050 Project to train graduate students and develop knowledge about ecosystem functions in the Boreal ecosystem of Canada. Creed also collaborates internationally, participating in numerous international panels and delegations and in multiple international reports including a scientific synthesis report based on contributions from more than 50 scientists around the world on the links between water and forests for the Global Forest Expert Panel of the International Union of Forest Research Organizations which was presented at the 2018 UN High-level Political Forum on Sustainable Development. Creed is currently leading an international collaboration of researchers and industrial and government partners in several projects funded by Environment and Climate Change Canada to develop and advance knowledge of wetlands as nature-based climate solutions.

=== Contributions ===
Creed has authored or co-authored over 200 peer-reviewed publications including articles, book chapters, and books, many of which were invited. Creed has delivered over 100 invited, keynote, or plenary presentations and has contributed to over 300 other presentations at Canadian and international conferences, workshops, and meetings.

Creed has studied the hydrologic effects of nutrient cycling in forest ecosystems. Using unique suite of methodologies and statistics, Creed and her lab discovered the variation of nutrient sources areas in catchments and where changes in the soil redox environment affect the exchange of greenhouse gases from and into the atmosphere. This information was previously unknown to scientists, specifically that summer storms cause nitrogen to release into the atmosphere, explaining why catchments are often missing expected nitrogen in summer months while snow-covered soils are an important source of nitrogen production that is not accounted for or monitored. Creed has shared this work both with other scientists as well as with policymakers who work on forest management.

Creed has made a significant impact on the Great Lakes Region with her work on risk management, which combined science and policy. This work utilized International Organization of Standardization (ISO) tools in order to gain a better understanding of the risks associated with natural resource extraction in the region. Creed has used ISO tools in other work as well in order to assess risk in ecosystem management techniques in a changing climate.

Creed has led two reviews that set research agendas for improving the scientific understanding of global change effects on freshwaters, focusing on hydrological and biogeochemical processes controlling the downstream movement of from headwaters to large rivers, proposing a conceptual model explaining the observation that rivers show a tendency towards chemostats, and examining the effects of global changes on the browning of lakes.

Creed was part of a team of international scientists who reviewed existing understanding of pressures on the world's freshwater ecosystems in the face of a global freshwater aquatic biodiversity crisis, and documented twelve new or intensifying threats to these ecosystems including global climate change and harmful algal blooms in a highly cited peer-reviewed article in Biological Reviews. Creed has published numerous articles in her studies to identify many of the conditions that provide cyanobacteria a competitive advantage over other algae, including higher temperatures, hydrological intensification, and iron limitations, which give rise to harmful algal blooms in northern temperate forest lakes.

Creed has also worked with American scientists to synthesize data to highlight the importance of enhancing protection for small streams and wetlands that form a large majority of the world's freshwater ecosystems but are the most vulnerable to loss or degradation, showing that these vulnerable waters are needed to maintain ecosystem functions and services upon which society depends. Aspects of this argument were presented in a series of high impact peer-reviewed articles urging policy makers to develop management strategies that recognize and protect these vulnerable waters.
