= S.M. Naqvi Gold Medal =

S. M. Naqvi Gold Medal was instituted in 2013 by the Geological Society of India in the name of the late Syed Mahmood Naqvi, an outstanding scientist who contributed extensively in the field of Precambrian geology. He was associated with the Society in various capacities till his death in September 2009. The S. M. Naqvi Gold Medal will be awarded every two years to a scientist below the age of 60 years for outstanding contributions in any field of Indian Geology.

== Medallists ==
Source: Geological Society of India

- 2013 Talat Ahmad and Arun Kumar
- 2015 R. P. Tiwari
- 2017 Birendra Pratap Singh, BHU, Varanasi

== See also ==
- List of geology awards
