= John J. Clague =

Canadian geologist

Dr. John Joseph Clague
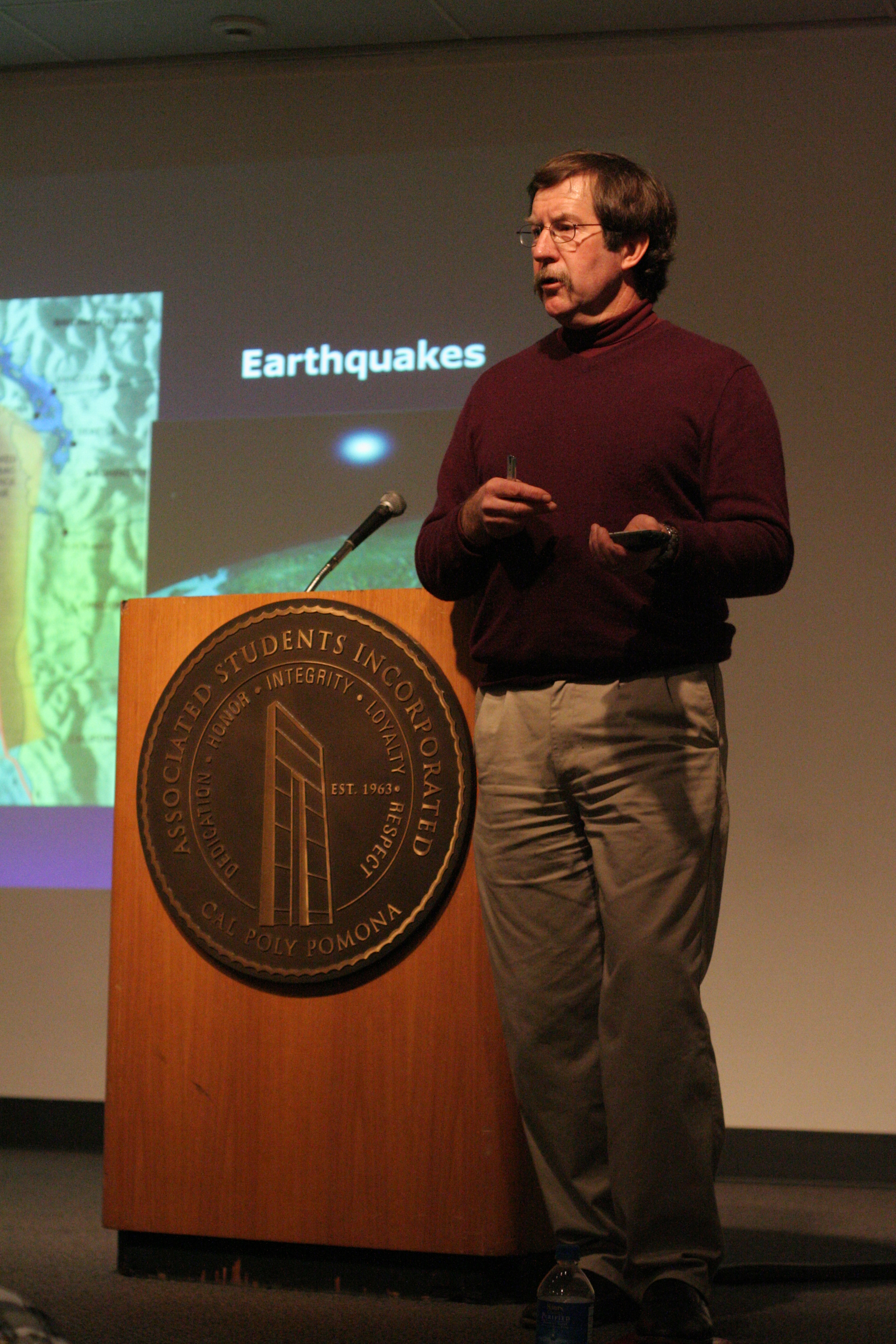
- Born: 1946 (age 79–80); San Diego, California
- Citizenship: Canadian
- Education: Occidental College; University of California, Berkeley; University of British Columbia
- Known for: Expert on geological hazards; earthquakes, tsunamis, landslides, and floods
- Scientific career
- Fields: Quaternary; Environmental earth sciences
- Workplaces: Geological Survey of Canada; Simon Fraser University

John Joseph Clague PhD FRSC OC (born 1946) is a Canadian authority in Quaternary and environmental earth sciences. He is a professor of earth sciences at Simon Fraser University and an emeritus scientist of the Geological Survey of Canada.

Clague was the editor-in-chief of the Canadian Journal of Earth Sciences, president of the Canadian Geomorphology Research Group and vice president of International Union for Quaternary Research (INQUA).

Clague focuses on the science of the last 2 million years of earth geological history, particularly geological hazards, such as earthquakes, tsunamis, landslides, and floods.

He has received recognition for his research, his communication of science to the public, and his service and leadership in geoscience.

== Education ==
In 1967, Clague earned an A.B. magna cum laude from the Occidental College. Two years later he obtained a M.A. in Geology from the University of California, Berkeley. In 1973 he earned his Ph.D. in Geology from the University of British Columbia.

== Career ==
From 1973 to 1998, Clague worked for the Geological Survey of Canada in Vancouver studying the evidence and effects of historic disasters. Specializing in the study of major earthquakes in the Pacific Northwest.

Clague spent many years mapping the glacial deposits over a large area of the Fraser drainage basin of central British Columbia. This research allowed him to describe the character and extent of the ice sheet that once covered the area, the pattern and timing of ice growth and decay, and the effects of the ice sheet on the crust of western Canada.

In 1984, he and fellow geologist Prof. G.H. Eisbacher had their book Destructive Mass Movements in High Mountains published.

In 1998, Clague took the position of Professor and Shrum Chair at the Department of Earth Science at Simon Fraser University (SFU). He established an interdisciplinary research program drawing together researchers from different fields together, for example, geologists, biologists, physicists, and physical geographers. His collaborators include scientists at the Geological Survey of Canada, the U.S. Geological Survey, and the British Columbia Geological Survey, and faculty at SFU, University of British Columbia and Carlton University.

In 2003, Clague was appointed Canada Research Chair in Natural Hazards Research at Simon Fraser University.

== Work ==
Clague's maps and reports have provided information vital to land-use planning, the forestry industry, urban developers, and the siting of highways, pipelines and railroads. With this background, he went on to investigate other natural hazards such as earthquakes and tsunamis. Clague's concern about potential earthquakes on the west coast led to research on recent subsurface deformation of the Earth's crust, and on geological evidence of past tsunamis.

Correlation of earthquake and tsunami events showed that magnitude 6 to 7 earthquakes have affected southern Vancouver Island about once every 100 years. Not content with this academic success, he became a leading voice in alerting people and governments to the challenges of coping with and planning for future disasters. It is expected that the threat of large magnitude earthquakes will lead to changes in the National Building Code and improvements in emergency preparedness procedures in the Vancouver area.

Clague has vigorously led efforts to make scientific understanding of earthquakes, landslides, and floods more available to the general public, educators and politicians. He has had numerous television and radio interviews (CBC Newsworld, CBC Radio, CTV Television) and has been featured in newspaper and magazine articles (Vancouver Sun, Victoria Times-Colonist, Equinox, Beautiful B.C., Westside News, The Westerly News). Clague’s research was featured in a 1997 Discovery Channel documentary on earthquakes and tsunamis on the west coast of Canada.

Clague has made presentations to federal politicians on earthquakes and tsunamis as part of a series designed to increase politicians' knowledge of the impact of science in Canada.

== Accolades ==
- 2019, appointed as Officer of the Order of Canada by the Governor General of Canada
- 2007, awarded the Logan Medal by the Geological Association of Canada
- 2006, awarded the Neale Medal of the Geological Association of Canada
- 2003, first in the country to obtain a Canada Research Chair in Natural Hazards
- 2002, awarded the Bancroft Award by the Royal Society of Canada
- 1999, awarded the C. J. Westerman Memorial Award by the Association of Professional Engineers and Geoscientists of British Columbia
- 1998, elected to be a Fellow of the Royal Society of Canada
- 1995, awarded the W. A. Johnston Medal by the Canadian Quaternary Association
- 1988, awarded the E. B. Burwell Jr. Memorial Award by the Geological Society of America

== Select publications ==
- Clague, J.J. and Evans, S.G. 1998. Natural hazards in the Canadian Cordillera. In Engineering Geology; A Global View from the Pacific Rim. Edited by D.P. Moore and O. Hungr. A.A. Balkema, Rotterdam, Proceedings, 8th International Congress, International Association for Engineering Geology and the Environment, Vancouver, B.C., v. 1, p. 17-44.
- Mustard, P.S., Clague, J.J., Woodsworth, G.J., Hickson, C.J., Jackson, L.E., Jr., Luternauer, J.L., Monger, J.W.H., Ricketts, B.D., Turner, R.J.W., Hunter, J.A., and Monahan, P.A. 1998. Geology and geological hazards of the Greater Vancouver area. In Urban Geology of Canadian Cities. Edited by P.F. Karrow and O.L. White. Geological Association of Canada, Special Paper 42, p. 39-70.
- Thompson, S.C., Clague, J.J., and Evans, S.G. 1997. Holocene activity of the Mt. Currie scarp, Coast Mountains, British Columbia, and implications for its origin. Environmental and Engineering Geoscience, v. 3, p. 329-348.
- Hyndman, R.D., Rogers, G.C., Dragert, H., Wang, K., Clague, J.J., Adams, J., and Bobrowsky, P.T. 1996. Giant earthquakes beneath Canada’s west coast. Geoscience Canada, v. 23, p. 63-72.
- Turner, R.J.W., Clague, J.J., and Groulx, B.J. 1996. Geoscape Vancouver—poster. Geological Survey of Canada, Open File 3309, one sheet.
- Nelson, A.R., Atwater, B.F., Bobrowsky, P.T., Bradley, L.-A., Clague, J.J., Carver, G.A., Darienzo, M.E., Grant, W.C., Krueger, H.W., Sparks, R., Stafford, T.W., Jr., and Stuiver, M. 1995. Radiocarbon evidence for extensive plate-boundary rupture about 300 years ago at the Cascadia subduction zone. Nature, v. 378, p. 371-374.
