= Harold Williams (geologist) =

Canadian geologist

Harold 'Hank' Williams FRSC
- Born: 14 March 1934; St. John's, Newfoundland
- Died: 28 September 2010 (aged 76); St. John's, Newfoundland and Labrador, Canada
- Education: Memorial University of Newfoundland; University of Toronto
- Known for: Tectonics of the Appalachian Mountains
- Awards: Governor General's Medal (1956); Past President's Medal (1976); Douglas Medal (1980); Miller Medal (1987); Logan Medal (1988)
- Scientific career
- Fields: Geology
- Workplaces: Geological Survey of Canada; Memorial University of Newfoundland
- Thesis: A petrographic study of the Metamorphic rocks of the Chisel lake area, northern Manitoba (1961)
- Doctoral advisor: J. Tuzo Wilson

Harold Williams (14 March 1934 – 28 September 2010) was one of the premier field geologists in the history of Newfoundland geology and the foremost expert on the Appalachian Mountains of North America. An expert on the evolution and tectonic development of mountain belts, Williams advanced the theory of colliding super-continents in the 1960s and 1970s by helping to transform the notion of continental drift into the theory of plate tectonics.

== Background ==
Williams was born in St. John's, Newfoundland and attended Memorial University of Newfoundland earning a diploma in Engineering and a Bachelor of Science degree (1956) and a Master of Science degree (1958) on a Dominion Command scholarship. He earned a Ph.D from the University of Toronto in 1961.

== Career ==
He thereafter joined the Geological Survey of Canada (GSC), where he gained the reputation of being an expert field geologist and outstanding scientist. He left the GSC in 1968 and joined the faculty at Memorial University of Newfoundland, where he was the first to receive the prestigious title of University Research Professor (1984) and the first to be appointed Alexander Murray Professor (1990). He was the first to win both the Past President’s Medal and the Logan Medal of the Geological Association of Canada.

== Groundbreaking work ==
He was elected Fellow of the Royal Society of Canada at age 38, a very rare accolade, and 15 years later was awarded the Miller Medal by its Academy of Science. First winner of the R.J.W. Douglas Medal of the Canadian Society of Petroleum Geologists, he was also the first geoscientist to be awarded an Isaac Walton Killam Memorial Fellowship and the first scientist of any kind to hold this award for four full years. He has over 250 publications to his credit and for several years in the past three decades has been the most cited Canadian geoscientist in the world.

Williams was among the first to describe the evidence for the existence of the Iapetus Ocean, the predecessor of the modern Atlantic Ocean. A sampling of these rocks is preserved and protected in Gros Morne National Park of western Newfoundland, which has qualified for UNESCO World Heritage Site recognition under his advocacy. Williams is perhaps best known for producing the world's first tectonic lithofacies map and the first geological map of the entire Appalachian Mountains in the U.S. and Canada in 1978.

== Awards ==
- Governor General's Medal, Memorial University of Newfoundland (1956)
- Dominion Command Scholarship, Memorial University of Newfoundland (1956,1957)
- Fellow, Royal Society of Canada (1972)
- Past Presidents Medal, Geological Association of Canada (1976)
- Izaak-Walton-Killam Research Fellowship (1976, 1978)
- R. J. W. Douglas Medal, Canadian Society of Petroleum Geologists, First Recipient (1980)
- University Research Professor, Memorial University of Newfoundland, First Recipient (1984)
- Miller Medal, Royal Society of Canada (1987)
- Logan Medal, Geological Association of Canada (1988)
- James Chair Professor, St. Francis Xavier University (1989)
- Alexander Murray Professor, Memorial University of Newfoundland (1990–1995)
- Honorary Research Professor, Memorial University of Newfoundland (2005–2010)
- Member, Canadian Mining Hall of Fame (2017)
