= Belle Bay Formation =

Geologic formation In Canada

- Stratigraphic range: 573 – 563 Ma
- Type: Formation
- Unit of: Long Harbour Group

Lithology
- Primary: Hornfels

Location
- Region: Newfoundland
- Country: Canada
- Occurrence of the Belle Bay Formation in southeastern Newfoundland

The Belle Bay Formation is a metamorphosed formation cropping out in Newfoundland, Canada. It is locally overlain by 1,000 feet (300 m) of the Andersons Cove Formation.
