= Aleksis Dreimanis =

Canadian geologist

Aleksis Dreimanis (August 13, 1914 – July 8, 2011) was a Latvian Canadian Quaternary geologist. He was born in Valmiera, Latvia.

== Biography ==
He first studied geology at the Institute of Palaeontology at the University of Latvia in Riga. In 1939, he worked as a lecturer at the University. As World War II was being fought, he also took on the responsibility of consulting in Quaternary mapping in the Latvian Institute of Mineral Resources. He was conscripted into the Latvian Legion in 1943 or 1944, and later sent by the German Army to work as a military geologist in Italy and Germany. After the war Dreimanis was appointed associate professor in the Baltic University in the Displaced Persons camps at Hamburg and Pinneberg in Germany.

In 1948, Dreimanis immigrated to Canada to assume a lecturer position at the University of Western Ontario in London, Ontario. Several Canadian institutions called on him for his Quaternary expertise, including the Geological Survey of Canada, the Ontario Department of Mines, and the Ontario Department of Planning and Development for the St. Lawrence Seaway Authority, the Thames River Conservation Authority and various private companies. The university promoted him to associate professor in 1956, then to professor in 1964. In 1980 the university gave made him an emeritus professor. In the over 40 years with the university, he has produced over 200 papers, notes and abstracts in the field of Quaternary research.

Between 1974 and 1982, Dreimanis acted as an international advisor for several groups including; the Polish Academy of Sciences, the Geological Survey of Finland, and the Ministry of Education in Finland.

Dreimanis maintained his link with Latvia. He made numerous visits as an invited lecturer to Riga, and to Tallinn in Estonia. He was a correspondent with the Dictionary of Latvian Technical Terminology from 1970 to 1986. He has been an associate editor of the Technical Review Journal (for Geology) from 1979. He served as chairman of the Commission on Technical and Natural Sciences at the Latvian Cultural Foundation from 1973 to 1976.

He died on July 8, 2011, at University Hospital, London, Ontario.

== Roles and duties ==
- 1960, Delegate to the International Geological Congress
- 1965, 1969, 1973, 1977 and 1982, Canadian delegate to the International Quaternary Association (INQUA) Congresses
- 1965, Co-organised the INQUA Field Excursion in the Great Lakes-Ohio River Valley *1972, Co-organised the INQUA Field Excursion with the Montreal lGC
- President of the INQUA Commission on genesis and lithology of Quaternary deposits
- President of the INQUA Working Group on tills
- 1974-1984, Leader of the Canadian Working Group of the UNESCO-IUGS International Geological Correlation Project on Quaternary Glaciations of the Northern Hemisphere
- 1974-1980, Councillor for the American Quaternary Association
- 1975, helped organize the Royal Society of Canada's Conference on Glacial Till
- 1976-1978, Associate Editor for Geoscience Canada
- 1980-1982, President of the American Quaternary Association
- 1981-1987, Associate Editor for Quaternary Science Reviews
- 1987, made Honorary Member of INQUA

== Awards ==
- 1967, awarded the Canadian Centennial Medal
- 1969, bestowed an honorary D.Sc. from the University of Waterloo
- 1978, awarded the Logan Medal by the Geological Association of Canada
- 1979, appointed to the Royal Society of Canada
- 1980, bestowed an honorary D.Sc. from the University of Western Ontario
- 1987, awarded the Distinguished Career Award by the Geological Society of America
- 1987, awarded the Centennial Medal by the Geological Survey of Finland
- 1988, awarded the Albrecht Penck Medal of the German Quaternary Association
- 1989, recipient of the W. A. Johnston Medal from the Canadian Quaternary Association
- 1990, made an Honorary Member of the Geographical Society of Latvia
- 1990, made a Foreign Member of the Latvian Academy of Sciences
- 1990, awarded the University of Helsinki Medal
- 1991, bestowed an honorary D.Geogr. from the University of Latvia
- 2003, awarded the Order of the Three Stars of Latvia for his contribution as a scientist to Latvian culture
