= Brian Norford =

Chancellor of the University of Calgary
- In office 1982–1986
- Preceded by: Louis Lebel
- Succeeded by: James S. Palmer

Personal details
- Born: September 15, 1932 (age 94) Gidea Park, London, England
- Education: Cambridge University; Yale University
- Occupation: geologist, paleontologist

Brian Norford (born September 15, 1932) is a British-Canadian geologist and paleontologist who served as the chancellor of the University of Calgary in Alberta from 1982 until 1986.

He concentrated on Ordovician and Silurian fossils.

== Research ==
- Geological Survey of Canada Bulletin

== Awards and recognition ==
Norford was awarded the Ambrose Medal of the Geological Association of Canada in 1994.
