= Xie Xuejin =

Chinese geochemist

- 谢学锦
- Born: 21 May 1923; Beijing, China
- Died: 24 February 2017 (aged 93)
- Education: Zhejiang University; Chongqing University
- Known for: Geochemical mapping
- Awards: AAG Gold Medal (2007)
- Scientific career
- Fields: Geochemistry
- Workplaces: IGGE, Chinese Academy of Sciences

Xie Xuejin (simplified Chinese: 谢学锦; traditional Chinese: 謝學錦; 21 May 1923 – 24 February 2017) was a Chinese geochemist who won the AAG Gold Medal in 2007. Xie was considered as the Father of Geochemical Mapping in China.

== Biography ==
Xie was born 21 May 1923 in Beijing, with his ancestral home in Shanghai. He was the son of the geologist Xie Jiarong. From 1941 to 1945, Xie studied physics and chemistry at the College of Sciences of Zhejiang University. Xie also studied chemistry at Chongqing University.

After graduation, Xie mainly worked for the Institute of Geophysical and Geochemical Exploration of the Chinese Academy of Sciences (CAS). He was elected as an academician of CAS in 1980. Xie also taught as a professor at Changchun Geological College (later merged into Jilin University), Jilin Province, China.

== Research activities ==
During the 1970s and 1980s, Xie proposed and led the National geochemical mapping project and the China-Regional Geochemistry-National Reconnaissance (RGNR) Project. He also technically sponsored these programs, and initially emphasized and demonstrated by mapping the gold mines in China's territory (see also Gold mining in China).

This RGNR project lasted for at least 24 years and scanned more than six million km^{2} of China's mainland surface. The useful information offered from this mega program also contributed to about 80% new mineral discoveries within recent two decades in China.

In the 1990s, Xie also contributed to the international standardization for methodology of world geochemical mapping.

Xie also further developed some new approaches of searching for buried giant ore deposits. Xie also proposed several deep-penetrating geochemical techniques and methods.

== Academic assignments ==
Xie has served many academic positions including:

- Leader, the Geochemical Exploration Research Division of the Institute of Geophysical and Geochemical Exploration, CAS.
- Deputy director, the Institute of Geophysical and Geochemical Exploration, CAS.
- Honorary director, the Institute of Geophysical and Geochemical Exploration, CAS.
- Member of the executive committee of the IGCP Board, UNESCO.
- Associate editor and the member of the editorial board of the Journal of Geochemical Exploration
- Member of the editorial board of the Geochemistry: Exploration, Environment, Analysis
- Member of the central executive committee and the chairman of the Analytical Technology Committee of the Global Geochemical Mapping Working Group, IUGS.

== Honors and awards ==
Xie received many honors and awards both from China and international organizations, especially the prestigious AAG Gold Medal from the Association of Applied Geochemists in June, 2007 at the 23rd International Geochemical Exploration Symposium banquet in Oviedo, Spain, for "his outstanding scientific achievements in exploration geochemistry".

== Monograph ==
- Geochemistry: Proceedings of the 30th International Geological Congress, by Xie Xuejing (Editor); Page: 288; Publisher: Brill Academic Publishers (1 October 1997); Language: English; ISBN 90-6764-267-3, ISBN 978-90-6764-267-5.
