= Xie Jiarong =

Chinese geologist

- 谢家荣
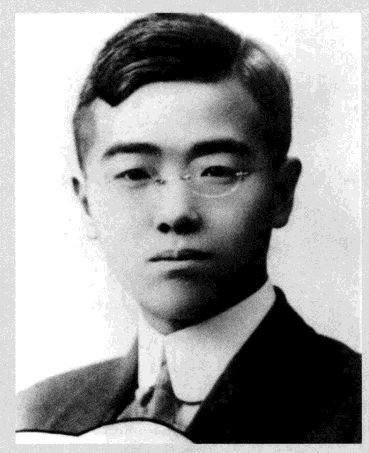
- Xie Jiarong in 1918.
- Born: August 19, 1897; Shanghai, Qing China
- Died: August 14, 1966 (aged 68); Beijing, China
- Education: Stanford University; University of Wisconsin; University of Freiburg
- Spouse: Wu Jingnong
- Children: 5, including Xie Xuejin
- Scientific career
- Fields: Geology
- Workplaces: Chinese Academy of Sciences

Chinese name
- Traditional Chinese: 謝家榮
- Simplified Chinese: 谢家荣
Transcriptions
Standard Mandarin
- Hanyu Pinyin: Xiè Jiāróng

Xie Jiarong (Chinese: 谢家荣; 19 August 1897 – 14 August 1966), courtesy name Jihua (季骅; 季驊), was a Chinese geologist and one of the founders of the Geological Society of China. Xie was the founder of mineral deposit in China.

Xie was a member of the Academia Sinica, Chinese Academy of Sciences, and Jiusan Society.

== Biography ==
Xie was born into a poor family in Shanghai, on August 19, 1897, during the late Qing dynasty. In 1913 he was accepted to the Institute of Geology and graduated in 1916. That same year, he published his research paper of three coal fields in Luan County, Fengcheng County and Jinxian County.

In 1917, he was sent abroad to study at the expense of the government. At first, he studied at Stanford University in California, but switched to the University of Wisconsin a year later. He returned to China in 1920 and that year became a geologist at the Ministry of Agriculture and Commerce.

In 1921, Xie went to Gansu province in northwestern China to perform investigations with Weng Wenhao and Wang Lie. After the end of the work, he published the preliminary results of the Gansu Yumen oil report.

Xie was a professor at Southeast University and Sun Yat-sen University from 1924 to 1927. In 1925 he went to Germany to perform investigations. There, he pursued advanced studies at the University of Freiburg in 1929. Xie returned to China in 1930 and that same year he was assigned to the Ministry of Industry. A year later he was hired as a professor at Tsinghua University, and in 1948 Xie was elected an academician of the Academia Sinica.

In 1949, the year of the victory of the Communists over the Nationalists in the Chinese Civil War, Xie stayed in mainland China. He was appointed as an official in Nanjing, Jiangsu. In 1952, he became the chief engineer of the newly established Ministry of Geology.

In 1957 Xie and his son Xie Xuejin were labeled as rightists by the Communist Government. They were mistreated and tortured in prison. After Mao Zedong launched the ten-year Cultural Revolution in 1966, Red Guards attacked Xie as a counter-revolutionary. They paraded Xie through the streets, beat him in public, searched his house, and confiscated his property. He could not endure the humiliation and committed suicide by swallowing sleeping pills. One month later, his wife, Wu Jingnong, also committed suicide by swallowing sleeping pills.

== Personal life ==
Xie married Wu Jingnong (Chinese: 吴镜侬), a graduate of Beijing Normal University. The couple had four sons and one daughter. Their children were, in order of birth: Xie Xuejin, Xie Xuequan (Chinese: 谢学铨), Xie Xuefang (Chinese: 谢学钫), Xie Xuezheng (Chinese: 谢学铮) and Xie Xueying (Chinese: 谢学锳).

== Works ==
- Hsieh CY. Preliminary Notes on the Composition and Structure of the First Speci Men of Meteoric Stone received by the Geological Survey of China. Bull．Geol．Soc．China, 1922, 1 (1–2): 95–97．
- Hsieh CY. Some New Methods in Coal Petrography. Bull．Geol．Soc．China, 1930, 9 (3): 311–328, pls．1–4．
- Hsieh CY. Note on the Geology of Changsintien-Tuoli Area, S. W. of Peiping. Bull．Geol．Soc．China, 1933, 12: 513–529, pls．1–3．
- Hsieh CY. On the Late Mesozoic-Early Tertiary Orogenesis and Vulka-nism, and Their Relation to the Formation of Metallica Deposits in China. Bull．Geol．Soc．China, 1936, 15 (1): 61–74.
- Hsieh CY. An Outline of the Geological Structure of the Western Hills of Peiping. Bull．Geol．Soc．China, 1936–1937, 16: 371–388.
- Hsieh CY. Tin Placer Deposits in Fuhochungkiang Area, Northeastern Juangsi and Southern Hunan, and with a Note on the Distribution of Tin Belts in China. Bull．Geol．Soc．China, 1943, 23 (1–2): 79–94, pls．1–2．
- Hsieh CY. Palaeogeography as Aguide Mineral Exploration. Bull．Geol．Soc．China, 1948, 28 (1–2): 1–11
- Hsieh CY. On the Geotectionic Framework of China. Scientia Sinica. 1962, 11 (8): 1131–1146
- Hsieh CY. A Study of the Tin Depositsin China. Scientia Sinica. 1963, 12 (3): 373–390.
- Hsieh CY. Problems Pertaining to Geology and Ore Deposits of a Cop-per Depositin Shanxi Province. Scientia Sinica. 1963, 12 (9): 1345–1355.
