= Association of Applied Geochemists =

- Abbreviation: AAG
- Formation: 1970; 56 years ago
- Type: INGO
- Region served: Worldwide
- Official language: English, French
- Website: AAG Official website

The Association of Applied Geochemists (AAG) is an international society that seeks to advance the study and application of geochemistry and represents scientists working in that field.

== History ==
The society was founded in 1970 as the Association of Exploration Geochemists.

== Membership ==
Members of the society are required to have worked in geochemistry for at least two years at the time of application; student members are admitted if they are enrolled in courses recognised by the Association. To become a voting member, or fellow, members must satisfy the society that they have adequate training and experience in the field. Membership in the society has been used to measure total numbers of working geochemists.

== Activities ==
=== Symposia ===
The Association organizes a series of biennial International Applied Geochemistry Symposia (titled the International Geochemical Exploration Symposium until 2005), held recently in Oviedo, Spain, and Perth, Australia.

=== Publications ===
Shortly after its inauguration the society began publishing the Journal of Exploration Geochemistry in 1972. Today the society's flagship journal is Geochemistry: Exploration, Environment, Analysis, co-published with the Geological Society of London. The journal covers fields relating to the application of geochemistry to the exploration and study of mineral resources. It aims to promote interchange between exploration and environmental geochemistry. The journal is a hybrid open-access journal, publishing both subscription and open access articles. It also publishes Explore, a newsletter, and co-publishes Elements, a membership magazine.

=== Awards ===
The Society awards the AAG Gold Medal to recognize a lifetime's achievement in or outstanding contribution to applied geochemistry. It also offers an annual student paper prize to reward student contributors of outstanding papers on geochemistry.
