= Canadian Society of Petroleum Geologists =

Canadian professional society

Canadian Energy Geoscience Association
- Founded: 1927
- Type: Professional Organization
- Purpose: Energy Geoscience, Petroleum Geology
- Location: Calgary, Canada
- Region served: Canada
- Method: Conferences, Publications, Training
- Members: 2,000
- Affiliations: American Association of Petroleum Geologists
- Employees: 5
- Website: www.cegageos.ca

The Canadian Energy Geoscience Association (CEGA) is a professional geoscience society in Canada. CEGA works to advance the science of geology, foster professional development of members and promote community awareness of the profession. The organization was founded on December 17, 1927, as the Alberta Society of Petroleum Geologists in Calgary and was modelled after the American Association of Petroleum Geologists. It is based in Calgary, Alberta.

== History ==
The society was founded in 1927 in Calgary, and was affiliated to the American Association of Petroleum Geologists in 1930. In the 1950s, the Saskatchewan Geological Society and the Edmonton Geological Society were affiliated to the ASPG.

The organization was renamed to Canadian Petroleum Geology Society in 1969, when it merged with the Saskatchewan Geological Society and the Edmonton Geological Society. In 2022 the society was renamed to the Canadian Energy Geoscience Association.

== Publications ==
The society published a Journal of Canadian Petroleum Geology, renamed in 1963 to Bulletin of Canadian Petroleum Geology. Another publication, the Geological History of Western Canada became the main reference for stratigraphy of Canadian geological units.

The society published the Atlas of Western Canada in 1964. It was edited by R.G. McCrossan and R.P. Glaister, and contained detailed references to the Geological History of Western Canada and the stratigraphy of the Western Canadian Sedimentary Basin.

== See also ==
- List of geoscience organizations
