= Geological Association of Canada =

- Abbreviation: GAC
- Formation: 14 February 1947
- Location: St. John's, Newfoundland, Canada
- President: Brian Pratt(2014-2015)
- Website: http://www.gac.ca

The Geological Association of Canada (GAC) is a learned society that promotes and develops the geological sciences in Canada. The organization holds conferences, meetings and exhibitions for the discussion of geological problems and the exchange of views in matters related to geology. It publishes various journals and collections of learned papers dealing with geology.

== History ==
On February 14, 1947, a group of geologists met in Toronto with the objective of creating the Geological Institute of Canada, an association of geologists with the purpose of promoting, discussing and disseminating geological knowledge. Later that year a preliminary Constitution and Bylaws were approved and the first councillors were elected. The organization's name was changed to the Geological Association of Canada. The group initially began with 140 charter members.

The Association was designed to bridge the gap between the perceived industrial mineral orientation of the Geological Division of the Canadian Institute of Mining and Metallurgy, and the purely scientific objectives of Section IV of the Royal Society of Canada.

The Geological Association of Canada (GAC) is currently a national multi-disciplinary geoscience organization with representatives in all Canadian Territories and Provinces as well as the United States, Europe and other parts of the world. The GAC makes significant contributions to the promotion and development of the geological sciences in Canada through publications, awards, conferences, meetings and exhibitions.

Objectives of the Geological Association of Canada:

- to promote the science of geology and closely related fields of study
- to promote the knowledge of its members
- to hold conferences, meetings and exhibitions for the discussion of geological problems and the exchange of views in matters related to geology
- to publish journals and collections of learned papers dealing with geology

GAC provides geoscientists from Canada and abroad with Annual Conferences, known as the GAC-MAC (Mineralogical Association of Canada), Sympsia, Short Courses, Field Trips, National Geoscience Lecture Tours, as well as Geoscience Canada and GEOLOG publications.

== Sections and Divisions ==
GAC Members can also choose to join and participate in numerous Sections, representing geographic regions; and Divisions, representing specific branches of geoscience. The GAC's Sections and Divisions publish books and newsletters, host meetings, talks and lectures along with promoting general geoscience relative to their areas or disciplines.

Sections include:

- AQUEST (Quebec)
- Cordilleran (Vancouver, British Columbia)
- Edmonton Geological Society (Alberta)
- Newfoundland and Labrador Section
- Pacific Section (Victoria, British Columbia)
- Winnipeg Geological Society (Winnipeg, Manitoba)

Divisions include:

- Canadian Geomorphological Research Group
- Canadian Sedimentology Research Group
- Canadian Tectonics Group
- Environmental Earth Sciences Division
- Geomatics Division
- Geophysics Division
- Isotope Sciences Division
- Marine Geosciences Division
- Mineral Deposit Division
- Paleontology Division
- Planetary Sciences Division
- Precambrian Division
- Volcanology and Igneous Petrology Division

== Medals and awards ==
The Geological Association of Canada recognizes geological contributions with a series of individual awards.

- The Logan Medal for sustained distinguished achievement in Canadian earth science.
- The Ambrose Medal for sustained dedicated service to the Canadian earth science community
- The W. W. Hutchison Medal (previously the Past Presidents' Medal), awarded to a young individual for recent exceptional advances in Canadian earth science research
- The E. R. Ward Neale Medal for sustained outstanding efforts in sharing earth science with Canadians
- The Yves Fortier Earth Science Journalism Award for excellence in journalistic treatment of earth science in the newspaper medium

== Partner Societies ==
The Partner Societies are made up of GAC Members and persons organized as a local or university discussion group or society. They may be recognized as a Partner Society of the Association for the purpose of cooperation or participation in the Annual, Sectional, Divisional or other meetings and for the distribution of publications, and in such other ways for the furtherance of geoscience.

- American Geophysical Union
- Atlantic Geoscience Society
- Canadian Federation of Earth Sciences
- Canadian Geophysical Union
- Canadian Quaternary Association
- Canadian Society of Petroleum Geologists
- The Toronto Geological Discussion Group

== Allied Societies ==
- The Geological Society of America

== See also ==
- Geological Survey of Canada
