= List of geologists =

A geologist is a contributor to the science of geology. Geologists are also known as earth scientists or geoscientists.

The following is a list of notable geologists. Many have received such awards as the Penrose Medal or the Wollaston Medal, or have been inducted into the National Academy of Sciences or the Royal Society.

Geoscience specialties represented include geochemistry, geophysics, structural geology, tectonics, geomorphology, glaciology, hydrology, hydrogeology, oceanography, mineralogy, petrology, crystallography, paleontology, paleobotany, paleoclimatology, palynology, petroleum geology, planetary geology, sedimentology, soil science, stratigraphy, and volcanology. In this list, the person listed is a geologist unless another specialty is noted. Only geologists with biographical articles in Wikipedia are listed here.

== A ==
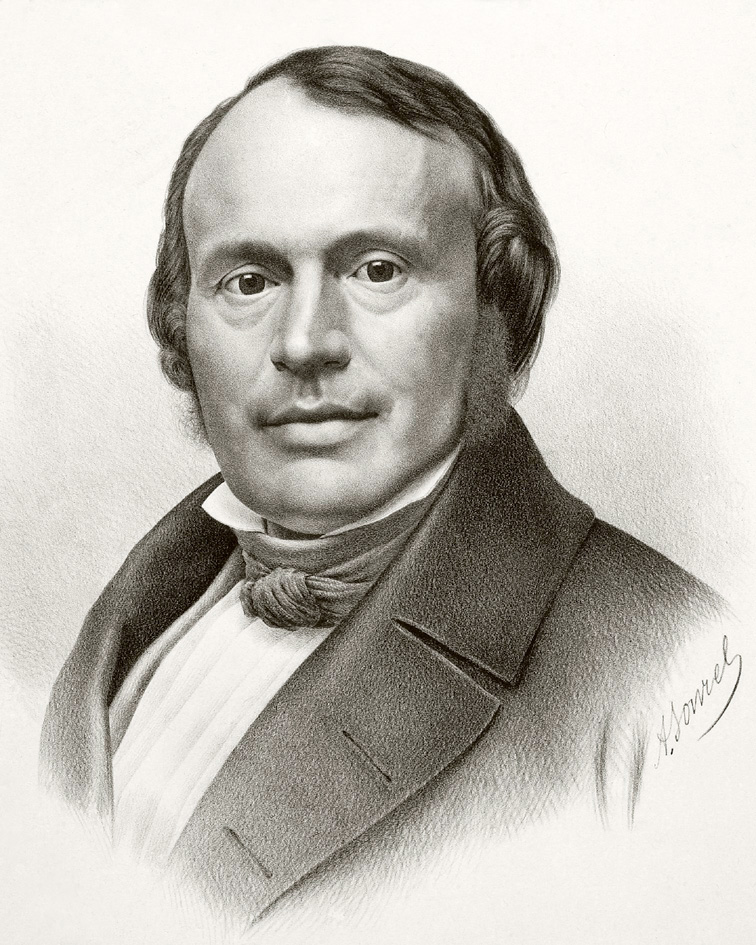
Louis Agassiz

- Vladimir Abazarov (1930–2003), Soviet geologist, discoverer of Samotlor oil field
- Aziz Ab'Saber (1924–2012), Brazilian geomorphologist, member Brazilian Academy of Sciences
- Otto Wilhelm Hermann von Abich (1806–1886), German mineralogist
- Louis Agassiz (1807–1873), Swiss-American geologist, work on ice ages, glaciers, Lake Agassiz
- Georgius Agricola (Georg Bauer) (1494–1555), German naturalist and 'Father of Mineralogy', author of De re metallica
- Ulisse Aldrovandi (1522–1605), Italian, Renaissance naturalist
- Claude Allègre (1937–2025), French geochemist, member of the French Academy of Sciences
- Fernando Flávio Marques de Almeida (1916–2013), Brazilian geologist, member Brazilian Academy of Sciences
- Walter Alvarez (born 1940), American, co-author of the impact theory for the Cretaceous–Paleogene extinction event
- J. Willis Ambrose (1911–1974), first President of Geological Association of Canada
- Ernest Masson Anderson (1877–1960), Scottish structural geologist, influential in theory of faulting
- Roy Chapman Andrews (1884–1960), American explorer and naturalist; Mongolian dinosaurs
- Mary Anning (1799–1847), English pioneer fossil collector
- Adolphe d'Archiac (1802–1868), French paleontologist, member French Academy of Sciences
- Giovanni Arduino (1714–1795), Italian, first classification of geological time
- Richard Lee Armstrong (1937–1991), American/Canadian geochemist, won Logan Medal
- Rosemary Askin (born 1949), first New Zealand woman to undertake her own research program in Antarctica in 1970.
- Tanya Atwater (born 1942), California, American geophysicist, marine geologist, plate tectonics specialist

== B ==
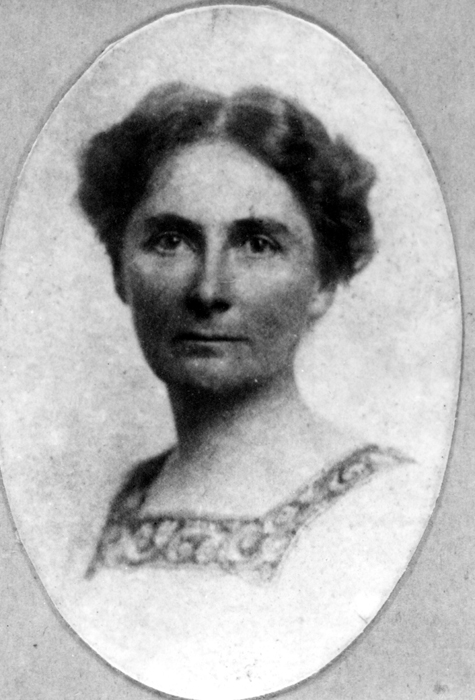
Florence Bascom, 1893

- Ralph Bagnold (1896–1990), British, studied deserts and the physics of sand
- Andrew Geddes Bain (1797–1864), South African, prepared first detailed geological map of South Africa
- Bashiru Ademola Raji, Nigerian geologist and pedogenesist
- Robert T. Bakker (born 1945), American dinosaur paleontologist; author, The Dinosaur Heresies
- Octávio Barbosa (1907–1997), Brazilian field geologist and prospector; Gold Medal, Sociedade Brasileira de Geologia
- Thomas Barger (1909–1986), American, pioneered oil exploration in Saudi Arabia, later CEO of Aramco
- Anthony R. Barringer (1925–2009), Canadian/American geophysicist and inventor
- Charles Barrois (1851–1939), French geologist and paleontologist
- Florence Bascom (1862–1945), American, first woman geologist at the US Geological Survey
- Éliane Basse (1899–1985), French geologist and research director at the National Center for Scientific Research (CNRS)
- Abhijit Basu, Indian born American geologist
- Robert Bell (1841–1917), considered Canada's greatest explorer-scientist
- Walter A. Bell (1889–1969), Canadian paleobotanist and stratigrapher
- Helen Belyea (1913–1986), Canadian geologist best known for her research of the Devonian System.
- Reinout Willem van Bemmelen (1904–1983), Dutch, structural geology, economic geology and volcanology
- Etheldred Benett (1776–1845), English, pioneer paleontologist
- Pierre Berthier (1782–1861), French geologist, discovered the properties of bauxite
- Luca Bindi (born 1971), Italian geologist, discovered the first natural quasicrystal icosahedrite
- Eliot Blackwelder (1880–1969), American field geologist, president of the Geological Society of America
- George Stanfield Blake (1876–1940), British geologist
- William Blake (1774–1852), President of the Geological Society of London 1815–1816
- William Phipps Blake (1826–1910), American geologist
- Selwyn G. Blaylock (1879–1945), Canadian chemist and mining executive with Cominco
- Stewart Blusson (born 1939), Canadian, co-discoverer of Ekati Diamond Mine
- Alexei Alexeivich Bogdanov (1907–1971), Soviet geologist
- Bruce Bolt (1930–2005), American (born Australia), pioneer engineering seismologist in California
- José Bonaparte (1928–2020), Argentinian paleontologist, discovered many South American dinosaurs
- William Borlase (1696–1772), Cornish natural historian, studied the minerals of Cornwall
- Norman L. Bowen (1887–1956), Canadian, pioneer experimental petrologist
- Scipione Breislak (1748–1826), Italian mineralogist and geologist, pioneer of volcanic gas collection
- J Harlen Bretz (1882–1981), American, discovered origin of channeled scablands
- David Brewster (1781–1868), Scottish physicist, studied the optical properties of minerals.
- Wallace S. Broecker (1931–2019), American paleoclimatologist and chemical oceanographer
- Robert Broom (1866–1951), South African palaeontologist, discovered australopithecine hominid fossils
- Barnum Brown (1873–1963), American, dinosaur hunter and self-taught paleontologist
- Christian Leopold von Buch (1774–1853), German geologist and paleontologist
- Mary Buckland (1797–1857), English, paleontologist, marine biologist and scientific illustrator
- William Buckland (1784–1856), English, wrote the first full account of a fossil dinosaur
- Judith Bunbury (born 1967), British, geoarchaeologist
- B. Clark Burchfiel (1934-2024), MIT structural geologist, studied the Tibetan Plateau; member of National Academy of Sciences
- Perry Byerly (1897–1978), American geophysicist and seismologist

== C ==
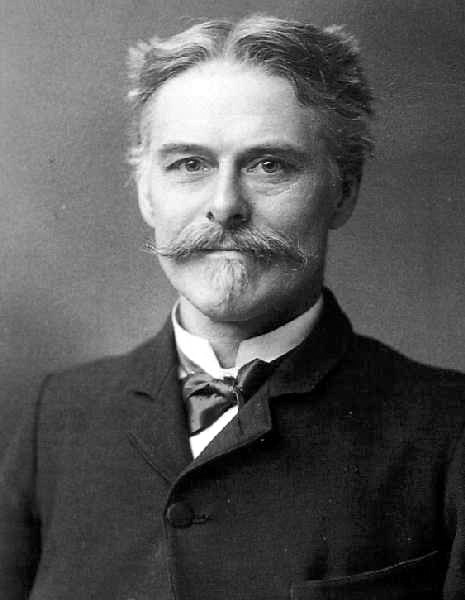
Edward Drinker Cope

- Louis J. Cabri (born 1934), Canadian, geologist and mineralogist, Fellow, Royal Society of Canada
- Stephen E. Calvert (born 1935), Canadian professor, geologist, oceanographer; awarded Logan Medal
- Colin Campbell (1931–2022), British petroleum geologist and Peak Oil theorist
- Neil Campbell (1914–1978), Canadian, Northwest Territories mineral exploration; Fellow, Royal Society of Canada
- Samuel Warren Carey (1911–2002), Australian, continental drift proponent and later developed Expanding Earth hypothesis
- María Casanova de Chaudet (1899–1947), Italian-born Argentine geologist, director of Argentina's first petrographic laboratory
- Petr Černý (1934–2018), Czech/Canadian mineralogist, won Logan Medal; Fellow, Royal Society of Canada
- Alexandre-Emile Béguyer de Chancourtois (1820–1886), French, geologist and mineralogist
- George V. Chilingar (1929–2023), American, distinguished international petroleum geologist
- Václav Cílek (born 1955), Czech geologist and science popularizer
- John J. Clague (born 1946), Canadian, Quaternary and geological hazards expert
- Thomas H. Clark (1893–1996), Canadian, co-author of The Geological Evolution of North America (1960)
- William Branwhite Clarke (1798–1878), Australian (born England), discovered gold in New South Wales, 1841
- Peter Clift (born 1966), British marine geologist and monsoon researcher, best known for work in Asia
- Hans Cloos (1885–1951), prominent German structural geologist
- Lorence G. Collins, (born 1931), American, petrologist, discoveries on metasomatism
- Simon Conway Morris (born 1951), palaeontologist and writer, best known for study of Burgess Shale fossils
- William Conybeare (1787–1857), English, author of Outlines of the Geology of England and Wales (1822)
- Isabel Clifton Cookson (1893–1973), Australian paleobotanist and palynologist, namesake of genus Cooksonia
- Edward Drinker Cope (1840–1897), American, pioneer dinosaur paleontologist; Bone Wars competitor
- Charles Cotton (1885–1970), New Zealand, geologist and geomorphologist
- James Croll (1821–1890), Scottish scientist who developed the theory of climate change based on changes in the Earth's orbit
- Georges Cuvier (1769–1832), French, proponent of catastrophism
- Lindsay Collins (1944–2015), Australian marine geologist and sedimentologist

== D ==
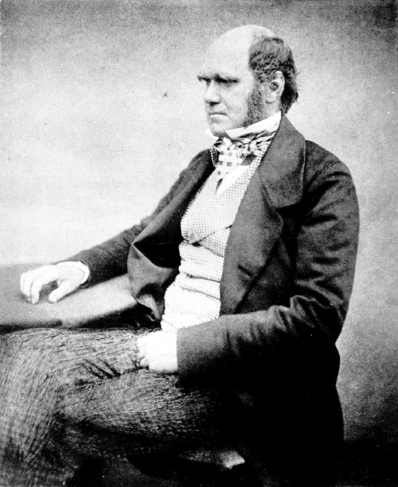
Charles Darwin, c.1860

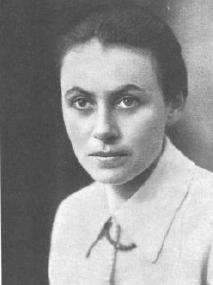
Ljudmila Dolar Mantuani (1906–1988) first female professor of petrography in Yugoslavia

- G. Brent Dalrymple (born 1937), United States, author The Age of the Earth (1991), winner National Science Medal, 2005
- James Dwight Dana (1813–1895), American, author of System of Mineralogy (1837)
- Charles Darwin (1809–1882), British naturalist, author of On the Origin of Species, atoll formation
- George Mercer Dawson (1849–1901), Canadian, pioneer Yukon geologist, Fellow of the Royal Society
- John William Dawson (1820–1899), Canadian, pioneer Acadian geologist, Fellow of the Royal Society
- Henry De la Beche (1796–1855), English, first director of the Geological Survey of Great Britain
- Duncan R. Derry (1906–1987), Canadian economic geologist, awarded Logan Medal
- Nicolas Desmarest (1725–1815), French, pioneer volcanologist
- Thomas Dibblee (1911–2004), American, geological mapper and pioneer of San Andreas Fault movement study
- William R. Dickinson (1930–2015), Arizona, American, plate tectonics, Colorado Plateau; Member of National Academy of Sciences
- Robert S. Dietz (1914–1995), American, seafloor spreading pioneer, awarded Penrose Medal
- Déodat de Dolomieu (1750–1801), French geologist
- Ljudmila Dolar Mantuani (1906–1988), Slovenian petrologist, first female professor of petrography in Yugoslavia
- Louis de Loczy (1897–1980), Hungarian-Brazilian geologist
- Ignacy Domeyko (1802–1889), Slavic-Chilean geologist and mineralogist, namesake of the mineral domeykite
- Robert John Wilson Douglas (1920–1979), Canadian petroleum geologist, Fellow of the Royal Society of Canada
- Aleksis Dreimanis (1914–2011), Latvian-Canadian award-winning Quaternary geologist, Fellow of the Royal Society of Canada
- Hugo Dummett (1940–2002), South African mineral-exploration geologist, co-discoverer of Ekati Diamond Mine
- Alexander du Toit (1878–1948), South African geologist, established correlations between Argentina, Paraguay, Brazil and South Africa
- Clarence Edward Dutton (1841–1912), American, author of Tertiary History of the Grand Canyon District

== E ==
- Edith Ebers (1894–1974), German geologist, glaciologist
- Heinz Ebert (1907–1983), German-Brazilian, geologist, petrologist; awarded gold medal, Sociedade Brasileira de Geologia
- Fanny Carter Edson (1887–1952), American petroleum geologist
- Niles Eldredge (born 1943), American, paleontologist; theory of punctuated equilibrium
- Jean-Baptiste Élie de Beaumont (1798–1874), French, prepared first geological map of France
- Kay-Chrisitan Emeis, German geologist and academic
- W. G. Ernst (born 1931), American, Stanford petrologist and geochemist, member of National Academy of Sciences
- Pentti Eskola (1883–1964), Finnish geologist and professor who created the concept of metamorphic facies
- Robert Etheridge, Junior (1847–1920), Australian (born England) paleontologist, longtime curator of the Australian Museum
- Raul-Yuri Ervier (1909–1991), Soviet geologist, an eminent organizer and head of wide-ranging geological explorations that discovered of the largest oil and gas fields in Western Siberia
- Maurice Ewing (1906–1974), American, pioneering geophysicist and oceanographer

== F ==
- Barthélemy Faujas de Saint-Fond (1741–1819), French, pioneer volcanologist
- Mikhail A. Fedonkin (born 1946), Russian paleontologist, awarded Charles Doolittle Walcott Medal
- Walter Frederick Ferrier (1865–1950), Canadian, mineral collector, namesake of the mineral Ferrierite
- Judy Fierstein, American, volcanology and petrology researcher of the U.S. Geological Survey
- Frederick C. Finkle (1865–1949), American consulting engineer and geologist; Chief Engineer on 18 major dam projects
- Michael Fleischer (1908–1998), American chemist and mineralogist
- Charles E. Fipke (born 1946), Canadian, co-discoverer of Ekati Diamond Mine
- Richard Fortey (1946–2025), English, trilobite paleontologist, author, Fellow of the Royal Society
- Yves O. Fortier (1914–2014), Canadian, High Arctic explorer, won Logan Medal
- Gillian Foulger (born 1952), British, professor of geophysics at Durham University; awarded Price Medal
- William Fyfe (1927–2013), Canadian geochemist, won Wollaston Medal

== G ==
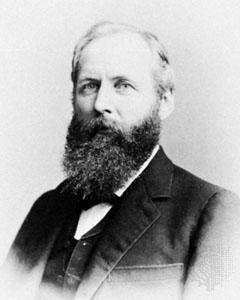
Grove Karl Gilbert

- Patrick Ganly (1809–1899), Irish surveyor and geologist, described the use of cross-bedding in stratification
- Robert Garrels (1916–1988), American geochemist, revolutionized aqueous geochemistry
- Archibald Geikie (1835–1924), Scottish, geologist, President of the Royal Society
- Mark S. Ghiorso (born 1954), American geochemist, thermodynamic modeling of magma
- Grove Karl Gilbert (1843–1918), American, influential Western geologist, won Wollaston Medal
- James E. Gill (1901–1980), Canadian, McGill University professor, explorer, Logan Medal winner
- Victor Goldschmidt (1888–1947), Norwegian (born Switzerland), a founder of modern geochemistry
- Stephen Jay Gould (1941–2002), American paleontologist and writer
- L. C. Graton (1880–1970), American, Harvard economic geologist, awarded Penrose Gold Medal
- Alexander Henry Green (1832–1896), English, surveyed Derbyshire and Yorkshire, Fellow of the Royal Society
- George Bellas Greenough (1778–1855), English, gentlemanly geologist, founding member and first President of the Geological Society
- John Walter Gregory (1864–1932), English, geology of Australia and East Africa, glacial geology, President of the Geological Society of London (1928–1930)
- Robbie Gries (born 1943), American, first female president (2001–02) of the American Association of Petroleum Geologists (AAPG)
- Djalma Guimarães (1894–1973), Brazilian geochemist and mineralogist in Minas Gerais
- Henry C. Gunning (1901–1991), Canadian (born Northern Ireland), British Columbia geologist, Logan Medal winner

== H ==
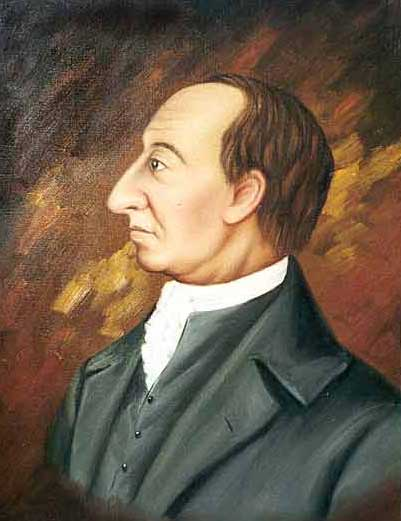
James Hutton

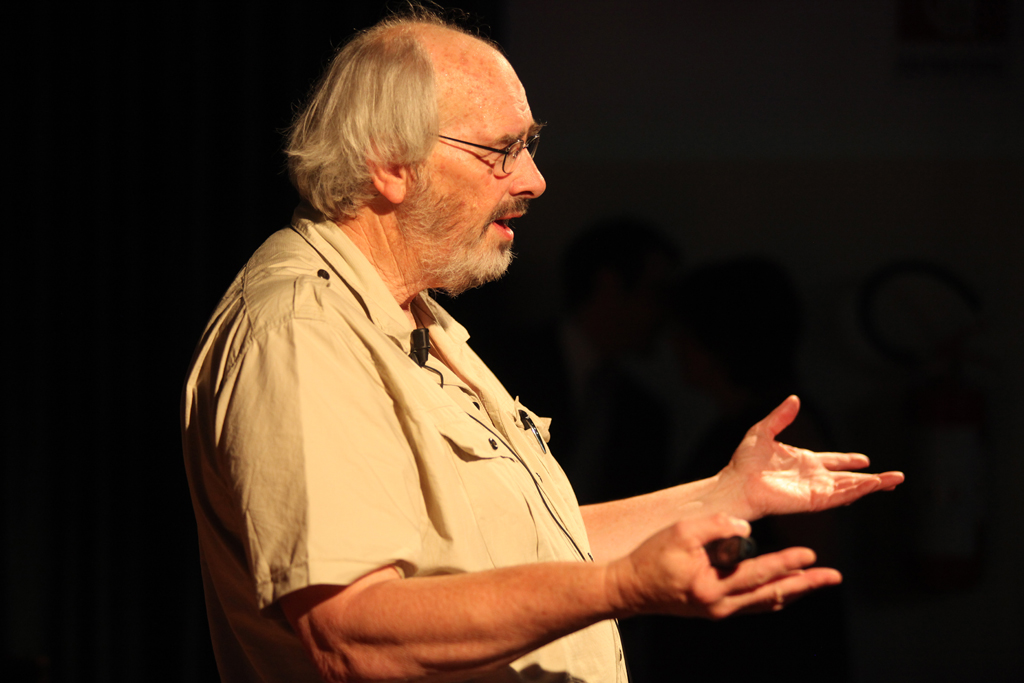
Jack Horner, 2012

- Julius von Haast (1824–1887), New Zealand (born Germany), founded Canterbury Museum
- Sir James Hall, 4th Baronet (1761–1832), Scottish geologist, president of the Royal Society of Edinburgh
- James Hall (1811–1898), American geologist and paleontologist
- William Hamilton (1731–1803), Scottish, volcanologist, Copley Medal
- Alfred Harker (1859–1939), English, igneous petrologist and petrographer
- W. Brian Harland (1917–2003), English, polar geologist
- Geoffrey Hattersley-Smith (1923–2012), English and Canadian, polar geologist
- Donald E. Hattin (1928–2016), American geologist and paleontologist
- Thomas Hawkins (1810–1889), English fossil collector
- James Edwin Hawley (1897–1965), Canadian, studied mineralogy of ore deposits
- Erasmus Haworth (1855–1932), founder of the Kansas Geological Survey and the first state geologist of Kansas
- Frank Hawthorne (born 1946), Canadian mineralogist and crystallographer
- Richard L. Hay (1929–2006), American geologist
- Ferdinand Vandeveer Hayden (1829–1887), American, pioneer Western geologist
- Robert Hazen (born 1948), American, mineralogist and astrobiologist
- Hollis Dow Hedberg (1903–1988), American geologist
- Bruce Heezen (1924–1977), American geologist who first mapped the Mid-Atlantic Ridge
- Sue Hendrickson (born 1949), American paleontologist; discoverer of "Sue", the largest Tyrannosaurus rex ever found
- Harry Hammond Hess (1906–1969), American geologist and oceanographer
- Laura Hezner (1862–1916), German geologist, first female lecturer at ETH Zurich
- Henry Hicks (1837–1899), FRS, President of the Geological Society
- Pattillo Higgins (1863–1955), American, known as the "Prophet of Spindletop"
- Wes Hildreth (born 1938), American, volcanologist and petrologist
- Eugene W. Hilgard (1833–1916), American (born Germany), soil scientist
- Dorothy Hill (1907-1997), Australian geologist
- Robert T. Hill (1858–1941), American geologist, Cretaceous deposits of Central Texas
- Claude Hillaire-Marcel (born 1944), Canadian (born France), Quaternary geologist
- Ferdinand von Hochstetter (1829–1884), German-Austrian, produced first regional New Zealand geological maps and surveys.
- Paul F. Hoffman (born 1941), American and Canadian, Snowball Earth theorist
- Arthur Holmes (1890–1965), English, author of Principles of Physical Geology
- Marjorie Hooker (1908–1976), American, acted as a mineral specialist for the United States Department of State from 1943 to 1947
- Jack Horner (born 1946), American dinosaur paleontologist
- Kenneth J. Hsu (born 1929), American (born China), author of The Mediterranean was a Desert
- M. King Hubbert (1903–1989), American, originator of "Peak Oil" theory
- James Hutton (1726–1797), Scottish geologist, father of modern geology

== I ==
- Edward A. Irving (1927–2014), Canadian, used paleomagnetism to support continental drift theory

== J ==
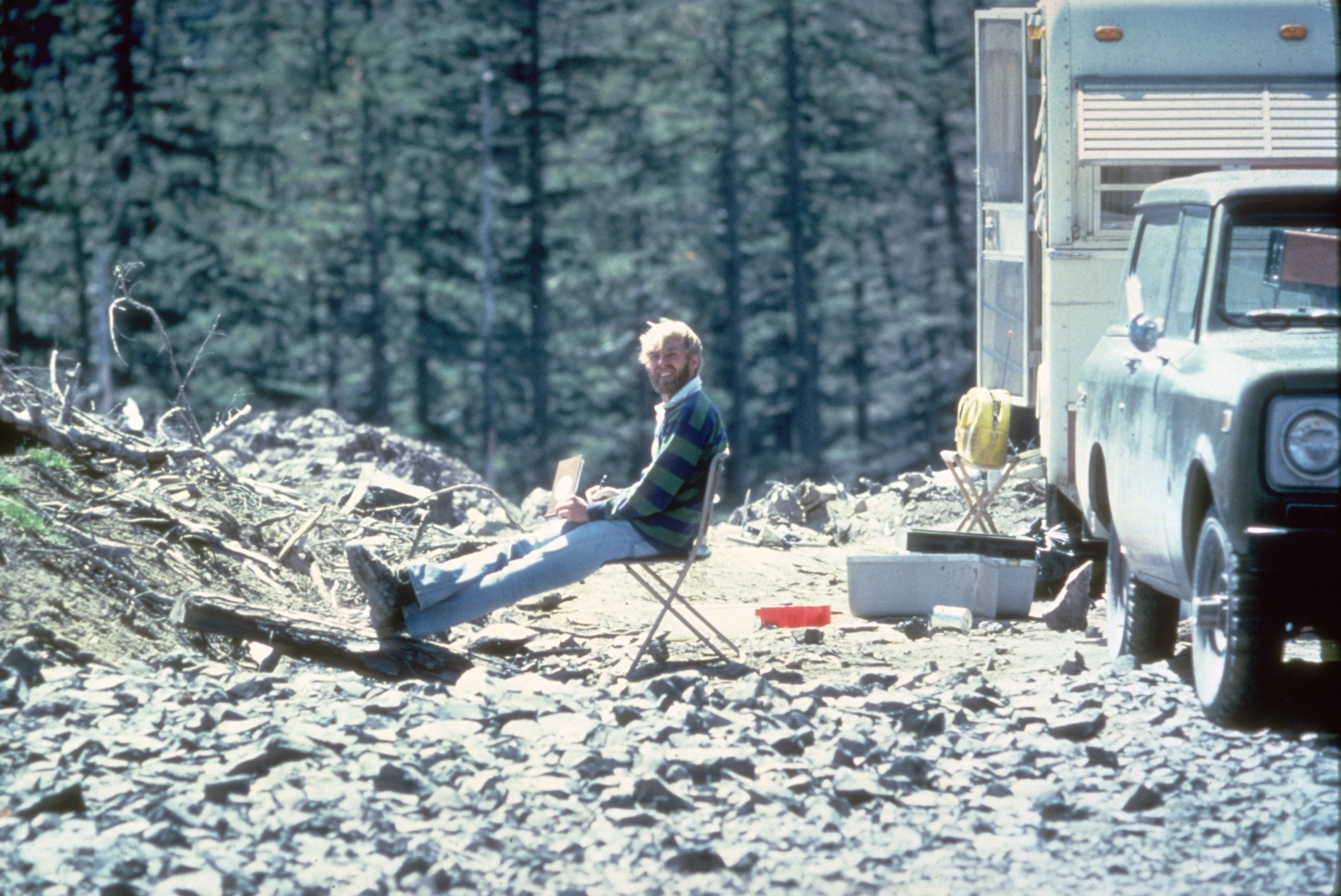
David A. Johnston at Mount St. Helens, 5-17-1980

- Thomas Jaggar (1871–1953), American, volcanologist and founder of the Hawaiian Volcano Observatory
- James A. Jensen (1911–1998), American, distinguished dinosaur paleontologist and sculptor
- Dougal Jerram (born 1969), British geologist/earth scientist, television and media presenter and author
- David A. Johnston (1949–1980), American, volcanologist, killed in the 1980 eruption of Mount St. Helens
- Franc Joubin (1911–1997), Canadian (born United States), discovered Elliot Lake uranium district
- John Wesley Judd (1840–1916), British geologist, professor at the Royal School of Mines, London
- Wilhelmine Mimi Johnson (1890–1980), Norway's first female geologist

== K ==
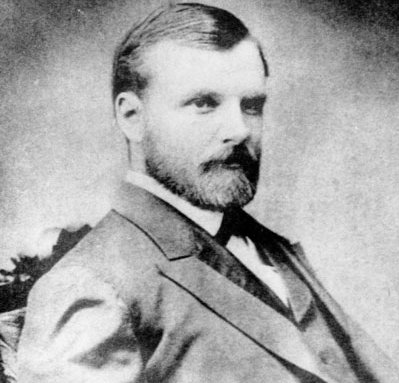
Clarence King, c. 1875

- Michael John Keen (1935–1991), Atlantic Canada, marine geoscientist
- Dennis V. Kent (born 1946), American geomagnetist
- Zofia Kielan-Jaworowska (1925–2015), Polish paleontologist, led several paleontological expeditions to the Gobi desert
- Clarence King (1842–1901), American, first director of the U.S. Geological Survey
- James Kitching (1922–2003), South African, Karoo vertebrate palaeontologist
- Sir Albert Ernest Kitson (1868–1937), Australian (born England), economic geologist, mineral exploration in Africa
- Maria Klenova (1898–1976), Russian marine geologist and one of the founders of Russian marine science
- Andrew H. Knoll (born 1951), American, Harvard geologist and paleontologist
- Danie G. Krige (1919–2013), South African mining engineer, inventor of kriging
- M. S. Krishnan (1898–1970), Indian geologist, author of Geology of India and Burma
- Thomas Edvard Krogh (1936–2008), Canadian, geochronologist, revolutionized uranium-lead radiometric dating
- William C. Krumbein (1902–1979), American, sedimentologist
- Nikolai Kudryavtsev (1893–1971), Russian petroleum geologist

== L ==
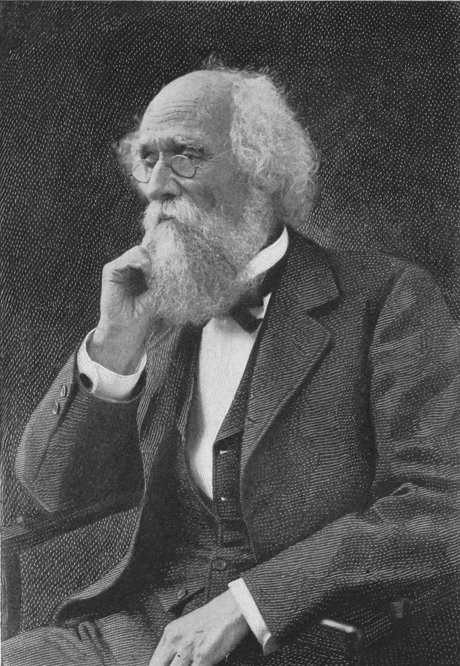
Joseph LeConte

- Alfred Lacroix (1863–1948), French geologist
- Charles Lapworth (1842–1920), English geologist, defined the Ordovician Period
- Andrew Lawson (1861–1952), American (born Scotland), named San Andreas Fault
- Richard Leakey (1944–2022), Kenyan paleontologist
- Joseph LeConte (1823–1901), United States, first professor of geology, University of California, Berkeley
- Robert Legget (1904–1994), Canadian non-fiction writer, civil engineer, pedologist
- Inge Lehmann (1888–1993), Danish seismologist, discovered Lehmann discontinuity. The asteroid 5632 Ingelehmann was named in her honour.
- Luna Leopold (1915–2006), eminent American hydrologist
- Xavier Le Pichon (1937–2025), French plate tectonics geophysicist
- Zofia Licharewa (1883–1980), Polish geologist and museum founder
- Waldemar Lindgren (1860–1939), distinguished Swedish-American economic geologist
- Li Shizhen (1518–1593), Ming Dynasty Chinese mineralogist, author of the Ben Cao Gang Mu (Compendium of Materia Medica)
- Martin Lister (c. 1638–1712), English, pioneer geologist
- William Edmond Logan (1798–1875), Canadian, founded Geological Survey of Canada
- Fred Longstaffe, Canadian, Provost of University of Western Ontario
- Rosaly Lopes (born 1957), Brazilian, planetary geology and volcanology
- Sir Charles Lyell (1797–1875), Scottish geologist, popularized principle of uniformitarianism

== M ==
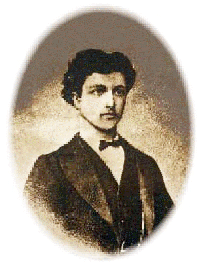
Andrija Mohorovičić, c.1880

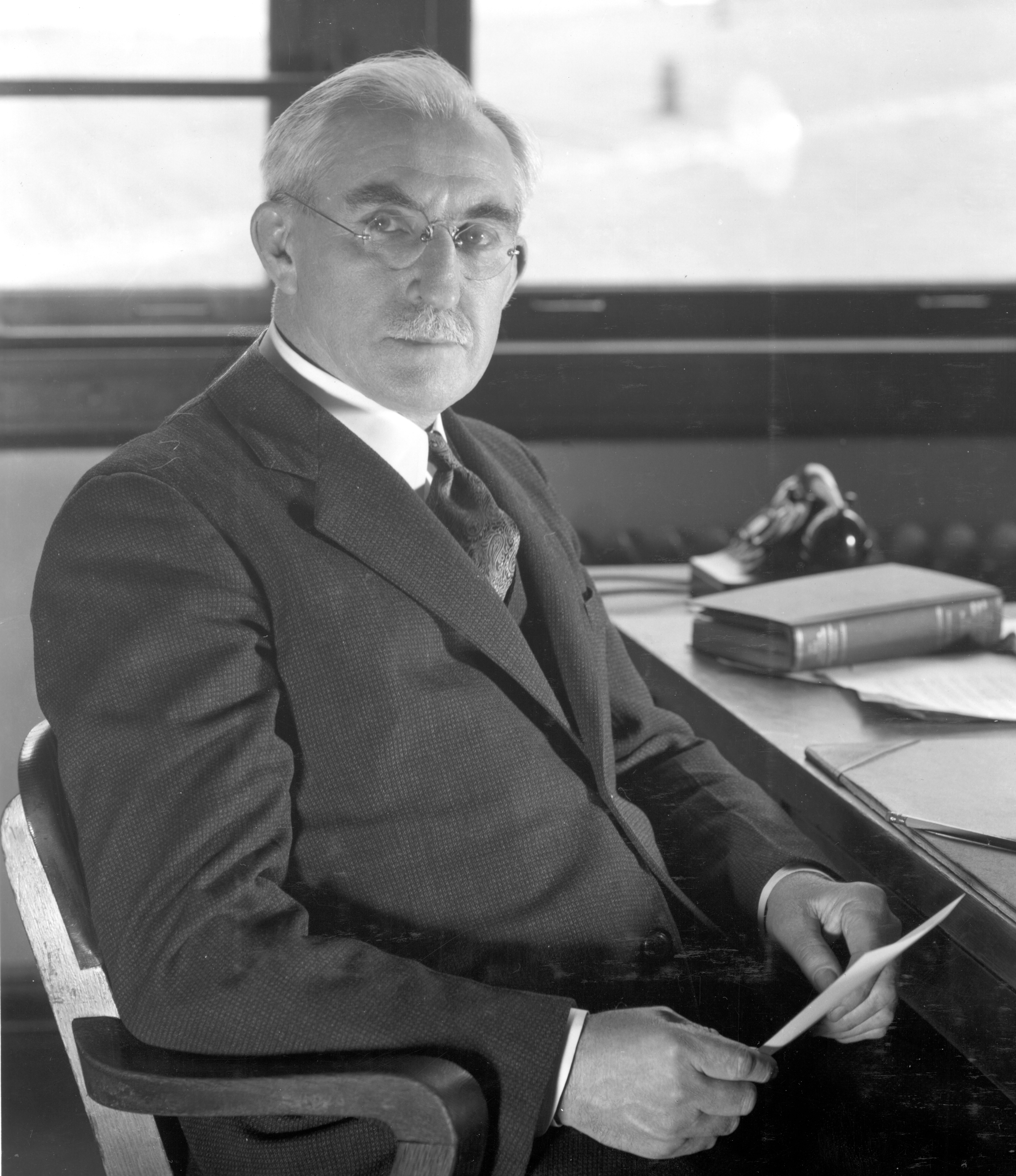
Oscar Edward Meinzer

- William Maclure (1763–1840), published first geological map of United States (1809)
- J. Ross Mackay (1915–2014), Canadian permafrost geologist
- Robert Mallet (1810–1881), Irish, "father of seismology"
- Vera Malycheff (1886–1964), Russian-born French geologist
- Joseph A. Mandarino (1929–2007), American mineralogist
- Othniel Charles Marsh (1831–1899), American, pioneer dinosaur paleontologist; Bone Wars competitor
- Teresa Maryańska (1937–2019), Polish, paleontologist specializing in dinosaurs
- Kirtley F. Mather (1888–1978), Harvard professor, Scopes Monkey Trial
- William Williams Mather (1804–1859), professor, de facto state geologist of Ohio
- Drummond Matthews (1931–1997), British marine geologist, geophysicist, plate tectonics pioneer
- Sir Douglas Mawson (1882–1958), Australian Antarctic explorer
- Sir Frederick McCoy (c. 1817–1899), British and Australian palaeontologist and museum director
- Edith Merritt McKee (1918–2006), American geologist
- Dan McKenzie (born 1942), British geophysicist, plate tectonics pioneer
- Digby McLaren (1919–2004), Canadian paleontologist, Fellow of the Royal Society
- Marcia McNutt (born 1952), American geophysicist and the 22nd president of the National Academy of Sciences (NAS) of the United States, 15th director of the United States Geological Survey (USGS) (and first woman to hold the post)
- Oscar Edward Meinzer (1876–1948), American hydrologist, "father of groundwater geology"
- Luiz Alberto Dias Menezes (1950–2014), Brazilian geologist and mineralogist
- Giuseppe Mercalli (1850–1914), Italian seismologist and volcanologist, developed the Mercalli intensity scale for measuring earthquakes
- Hans Merensky (1871–1952), South African economic geologist, discovered major diamond, platinum, chrome and copper deposits, including the Merensky Reef
- John C. Merriam (1869–1945), American, vertebrate paleontologist, studied fossils from La Brea Tar Pits
- Waman Bapuji Metre (1906–1970), Indian, petroleum geologist
- Ellen Louise Mertz (1896–1987), was one of Denmark's first female geologists and the country's first engineering geologist.
- Gerard V. Middleton (1931–2021), Canadian, sedimentologist, awarded Logan Medal
- Milutin Milanković (1879 - 1958), Serbian, geophysicist, climatologist
- Hugh Miller (1802–1856), Scottish, geologist, palaeontologist, author, The Old Red Sandstone
- John Milne (1850–1913), British seismologist and anthropologist, Order of the Rising Sun
- Andrija Mohorovičić (1857–1936), Croatian meteorologist and seismologist, discovered Mohorovicic Discontinuity
- Friedrich Mohs (1773–1839), German, devised Mohs' scale of mineral hardness
- James Monger, Canadian Cordillera geologist, won Logan Medal
- Eldridge Moores (1938–2018), American plate tectonics pioneer and petrologist who specialized in ophiolites
- Marie Morisawa (1919–1994), American geomorphology pioneer. The Geological Society of America established the Marie Morisawa Award in her honor.
- W. Jason Morgan (1935–2023), American plate tectonics pioneer, won National Medal of Science
- Edelmira Inés Mórtola (1894–1973), Argentine geologist for whom the Mórtola Mineralogy Museum was named.
- Eric W. Mountjoy (1931–2010), Canadian sedimentologist and petrologist, awarded Logan Medal
- Roderick Murchison (1792–1871), Scottish, author of The Silurian System (1839)
- Emiliano Mutti (born 1933), Italian petroleum geologist, won Twenhofel Medal

== N ==
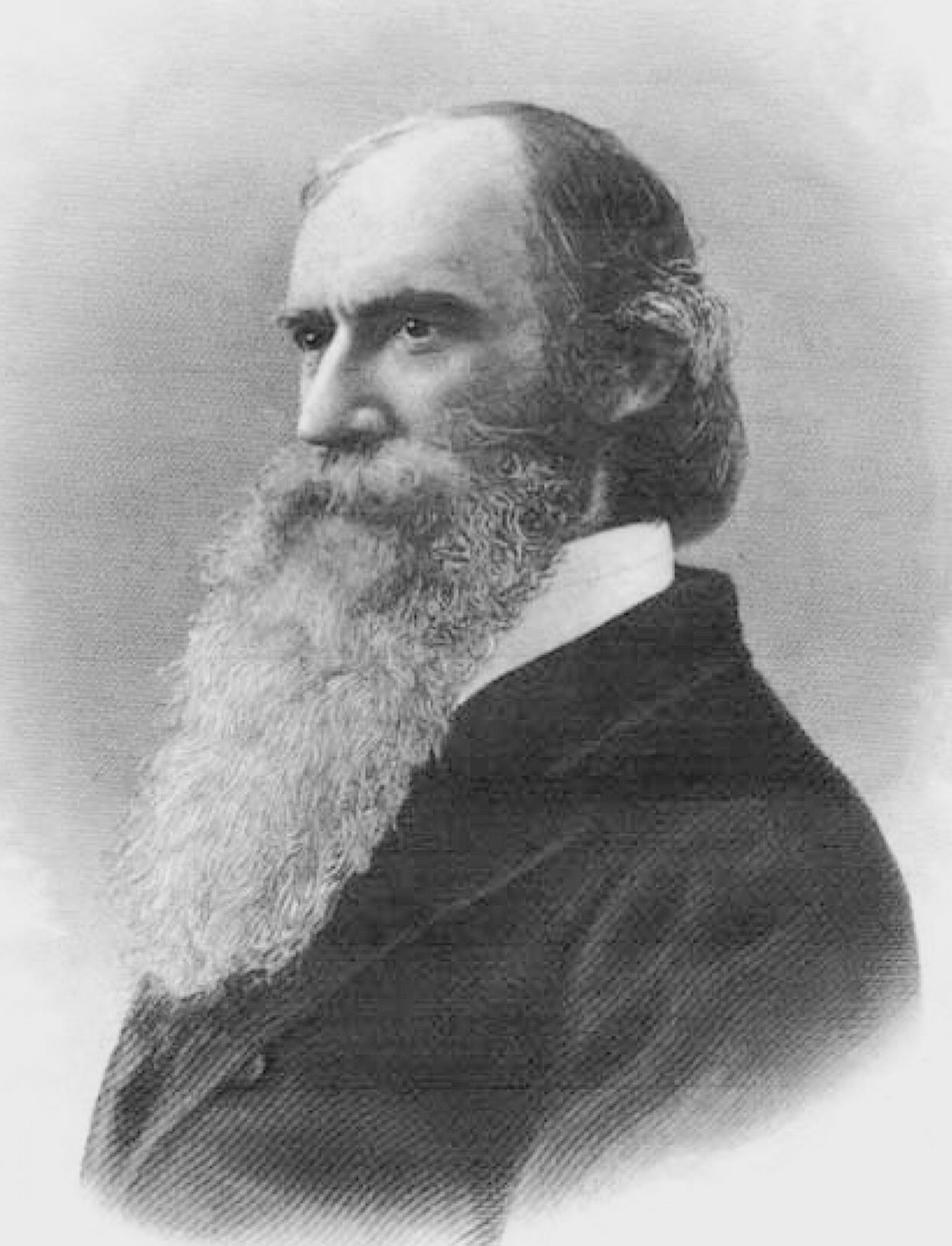
John Strong Newberry

- Anthony J. Naldrett (1933–2020), Canadian (born England) nickel ore geologist
- E. R. Ward Neale (1923–2008), Atlantic Canada geologist
- John Strong Newberry (1822–1892), American, pioneer Western geologist and explorer
- Ernest (Ernie) H. Nickel (1925–2009), Canadian mineralogist
- Stephen Robert Nockolds (1909–1990), FRS and Murchison Medallist, petrologist
- Nils Gustaf Nordenskiöld (1792–1866), Finnish and Russian, mineralogist

== O ==
- Henry Fairfield Osborn (1857–1935), American geologist and paleontologist
- Halszka Osmólska (1930–2008), Polish paleontologist specializing in dinosaurs
- John Ostrom (1928–2005), American, dinosaur paleontologist, discovered warm-blooded Deinonychus
- David Dale Owen (1807–1860), American, first state geologist of Indiana, Kentucky, and Arkansas

== P ==
- Joseph Pardee (1871–1960), American, channeled scablands
- Clair Cameron Patterson (1922–1995), American, geochemist, fought lead poisoning
- R.A.F. Penrose, Jr. (1863–1931), American, mining geologist, Penrose Medal
- Francis J. Pettijohn (1904–1999), American, sedimentologist
- John Phillips (1800–1874), Yorkshire geologist
- John Arthur Phillips (1822–1887), FRS, Cornish geologist, metallurgist and mining engineer
- Vasiliy Podshibyakin (1928–1997), Soviet geologist, discoverer of Urengoy gas field
- Vladimir Porfiriev (1899–1982), Russian petroleum geologist
- Henry W. Posamentier (born 1948), American, petroleum geologist
- John Wesley Powell (1834–1902), American, ex-soldier who mapped the Colorado River, second director of the USGS
- Raymond A. Price (1933-2024), Canadian, structural and tectonic geologist
- Raphael Pumpelly (1837–1923), American, geologist and explorer

== Q ==
- Jin Qingmin (1939-1999), Chinese, discovered for the first time the "breccia field peridotite" in Bachu Wajir Tagar in the Tarim Basin

== R ==
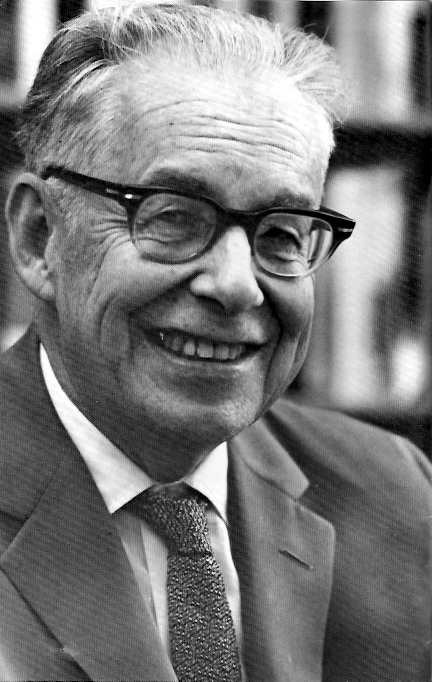
Charles Richter, c.1971

- Bangalore Puttaiya Radhakrishna (1918–2012), a founder and officer of the Geological Society of India
- John G. Ramsay (1931–2021), British structural geologist
- Frederick Leslie Ransome (1868–1935), American (born England), USGS economic geologist, National Academy of Sciences
- David M. Raup (1933–2015), American, paleontologist; author of Extinction: Bad Genes or Bad Luck?
- Mary Louise Rhodes (1916–1987) American petroleum geologist; Permian Basin field research
- Charles Richter (1900–1985), American seismologist, devised Richter magnitude scale for earthquakes
- Ferdinand von Richthofen (1833–1905), German geologist and geographer
- Ronald Ringsrud (born 1951), American gemologist specializing in emerald research
- A.E. "Ted" Ringwood (1930–1993), Australian experimental geophysicist and geochemist, Wollaston Medal winner
- Andrés Manuel del Río (1764–1849), Spanish–Mexican mineralogist, discoverer of vanadium
- Alfred Rittmann (1893–1980), Swiss volcanologist, three-time president of the IAVCEI, Gustav Steinmann medal winner
- Mariano Eduardo de Rivero y Ustáriz (1798–1857), Peruvian mineralogist, founded the first school of mines and natural history museum in Gran Colombia
- John Cole Roberts (1935–2016), Welsh geologist, fracture patterning
- Ralph J. Roberts (1911–2007), American geologist, Nevada gold districts
- Meyer Rubin (1924–2020), American geologist, known for radiocarbon dating work with the USGS
- Stanley Keith Runcorn (1922–1995), British geophysicist and plate tectonics pioneer; Fellow of the Royal Society

== S ==
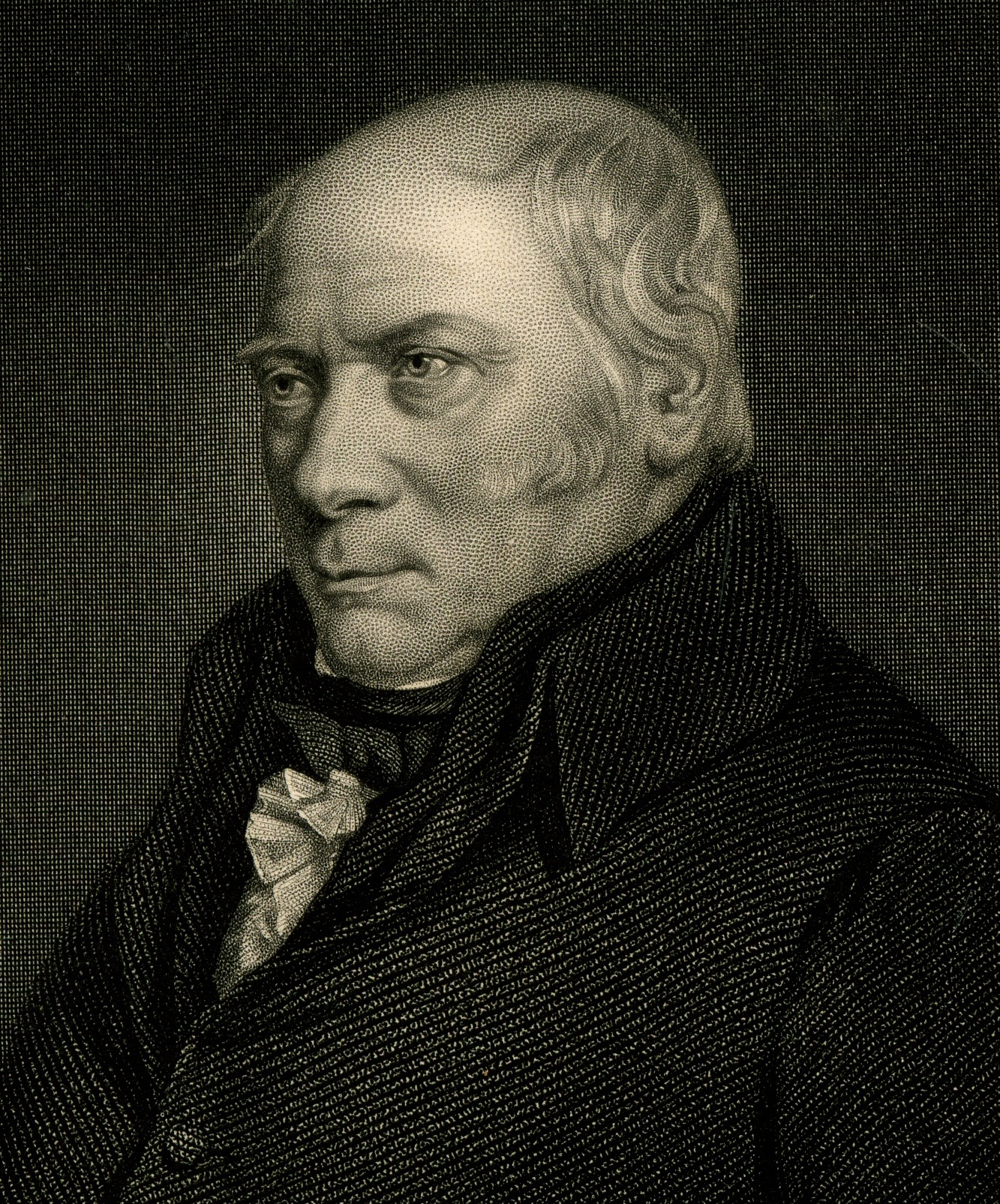
William Smith, father of English geology

- Donald F. Sangster, Canadian, lead-zinc economic geologist
- Emilia Săulea (1904–1998), Romanian geologist and paleontologist
- Celâl Şengör (born 1955), Turkish, member of The United States National Academy of Sciences and The Russian Academy of Sciences, Bigsby Medal, Gustav-Steinmann-Medaille and Arthur Holmes Medal winner
- Harrison Schmitt (born 1935), American, Apollo 17 astronaut, walked on the Moon
- Kevin M. Scott (born 1935), American, volcanology research in United States and China, Kirk Bryan Award
- George Julius Poulett Scrope (1797–1876), English, volcanology, Wollaston Medal
- Adam Sedgwick (1785–1873), English, proposed Devonian and Cambrian periods
- Karl von Seebach (1839–1880), German volcanologist
- Adolf Seilacher (1925-2014), German paleontologist, invented the concept and study of ichnofacies, coined the term "Lagerstätten", and championed the photoautotrophic view of the Ediacaran biota. Craaford Prize, Paleontological Society Award, Gustav-Steinmann-Medaille, and Lapworth Award winner, among others.
- Seikei Sekiya (1855–1896), Japanese seismologist, created the model showing the motion of an earth-particle during an earthquake
- Nicholas Shackleton (1937–2006), British geologist and climatologist
- Shen Kuo (1031–1095), Chinese scientist, magnetic compass pioneer, geomorphology theory
- Richard H. Sibson (born 1945), New Zealand geologist, defined the relationship between seismogenic processes and fault zone rheology.
- Eugene Merle Shoemaker (1928–1997), American, meteoriticist, co-discovered Comet Shoemaker-Levy
- Haraldur Sigurdsson, (born 1939), Icelandic, provided proof for a meteorite impact at the time of the extinction of the dinosaurs
- Leon Silver (1925–2022), American, National Academy, NASA medal for contribution to Apollo program's lunar explorations
- George Gaylord Simpson (1902–1984), American, paleontologist
- Kamini Singha (born 1977), professor at the Colorado School of Mines
- H. Catherine W. Skinner (1931-2025), mineralogist, specialist in medical geology, editor of Dana's New Mineralogy 8th edition.
- William Smith (1769–1839), father of English Geology
- Su Song (1020–1101), Chinese naturalist, author of treatise on metallurgy and mineralogy
- Paul Spudis (1952–2018), American planetary geologist
- Josiah Edward Spurr (1870–1950), American, geologist, author and Alaskan explorer
- Laurence Dudley Stamp (1898–1966), British, petroleum geologist and geographer
- Charles Steen (1919–2006), American, discovered uranium near Moab, Utah
- Max Steineke (1898–1952), American, discovered Abqaiq oilfield with 12 billion barrels of recoverable oil in Saudi Arabia
- Charles R. Stelck (1917–2016), Canadian, petroleum geologist, emeritus professor, Logan Medal winner
- Nicolas Steno (1638–1686), Danish, pioneer in early-modern geology, especially in stratigraphy
- Iain Stewart (born 1964), British, presenter of several television series on geology
- Clifford H. Stockwell (1897–1987), Canadian structural geologist, Geological Survey of Canada, Logan Medal winner
- David Strangway (1934–2016), Canadian, geophysicist and university administrator, Logan Medal award
- K. Hugo Strunz (1910–2006), German mineralogist, co-creator of the Nickel–Strunz classification.
- Eduard Suess (1831–1914), Austrian (born England), named Gondwanaland
- Peter Szatmari, Hungarian-Brazilian geologist, Gold Medal award, Sociedade Brasileira de Geologia

== T ==
- Pierre Teilhard de Chardin (1881–1955), French paleontologist and philosopher, co-discovered Peking Man
- Karl von Terzaghi (1883–1963), geologist and civil engineer, "father of soil mechanics"
- Marie Tharp (1920–2006), co-discoverer of the Mid-Oceanic Ridge
- Lonnie Thompson (born 1948), American, glaciologist and ice-core climatologist
- Sigurdur Thorarinsson (1912–1983), Icelandic, pioneered the field of tephrochronology
- Raymond Thorsteinsson (1921–2012), Canadian, Arctic geologist
- Bahal Tambunan (born 1974), Indonesian geoscientist who studies geothermal energy
- Phillip Tobias (1925–2012), South African palaeoanthropologist, homo habilis pioneer
- Otto Martin Torell (1828–1900), chief of the Geological Survey of Sweden
- Francis John Turner (1904–1985), New Zealand, igneous and metamorphic petrologist
- Joseph Tyrrell (1858–1957), Canadian paleontologist, namesake of Royal Tyrrell Museum of Palaeontology

== U ==
- Warren Upham (1850–1934), American, studied glacial Lake Agassiz
- David Ure (1749–1798), Scottish, known as "the father of Scottish palaeontology"

== V ==
- Charles-Louis-Joseph-Xavier de la Vallée-Poussin (1827–1903), Belgian geologist and mineralogist
- Jan Veizer (born 1941), Canadian isotope geochemist
- Felix Andries Vening Meinesz (1887–1966), Dutch geophysicist and gravimetric geodesist
- Rogier Verbeek (1845–1926), Dutch geologist and nature scientist
- Vladimir Vernadsky (1863–1945), pioneer Russian geochemist and biogeochemist
- Fred Vine (1939–2024), British marine geologist, geophysicist, plate tectonics pioneer

== W ==
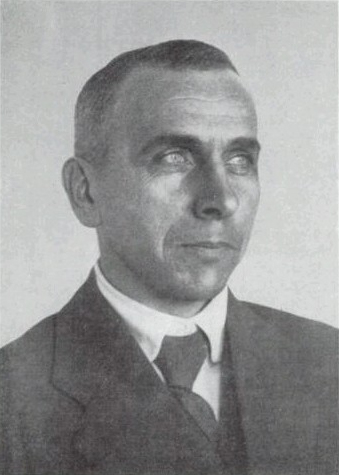
Alfred Wegener, c.1925

- Lawrence Wager (1904–1965), British geologist and explorer, discovered the Skaergaard intrusion
- Charles Doolittle Walcott (1850–1927), American paleontologist, discovered Burgess Shale fossils
- George P. L. Walker (1926–2005), British volcanologist
- Roger G. Walker (born 1939), Canadian sedimentologist, emeritus professor
- Wolfgang Sartorius von Waltershausen (1809–1876), German, magnetic observations and study of Mount Etna
- Janet Watson, (1923–1985), Precambrian specialist, first female president of the Geological Society of London
- Alfred Wegener (1880–1930), German meteorologist, continental drift pioneer
- Harold Wellman (1909–1999), New Zealand geologist of plate tectonics
- Abraham Werner (c. 1749–1817), German, proponent of Neptunism
- Israel Charles White (1848–1927), American, coal geology; Permian paleontology
- Josiah Whitney (1819–1896), chief of the California Geological Survey; Mount Whitney
- Harry B. Whittington (1916-2010), British palaeontologist, worked on Burgess Shale biota, professor at Cambridge
- Harold Williams (1934–2010), Atlantic Canada geologist
- Howel Williams (1898–1980), American (born England) volcanologist
- John Williamson (1907–1958), discovered the Williamson diamond mine, Tanzania
- J. Tuzo Wilson (1908–1993), Canadian geophysicist and plate tectonics geologist
- Newton Horace Winchell (1839–1914), American, geology of Minnesota
- Isaac J. Winograd, American geologist
- Jay Backus Woodworth (1865–1925), American geologist and president of the Seismological Society of America
- William Henry Wright (1876–1951), Canadian prospector and newspaper publisher, discovered Kirkland Lake gold district

== Y ==
- Eiju Yatsu (1920–2016), Japanese, geomorphologist
- Ivan Yefremov (1907–1972), Soviet paleontologist and originator of taphonomy
- Sorojon Yusufova (1910–1966), Tajik geologist, first person to publish a textbook in the Tajik language

== Z ==
- Peter Ziegler (1928–2013), Swiss petroleum geologist, researched on plate reconstructions and paleogeographies
- Mary Lou Zoback (born 1952), American geophysicist who led the world stress map project of the International Lithosphere Program

== See also ==
- List of geophysicists
- List of mineralogists
- List of paleontologists
- List of Russian geologists
