= Sociedade Brasileira de Geologia =

Sociedade Brasileira de Geologia (SBG)
- Other name: (English: Brazilian Geological Society)
- Established: 6 May 1945
- Mission: "To foster the knowledge and development of geosciences, applied geology and related research and technology and the rational and sustainable use of mineral and water resources"
- President: Djalma Guimarães
- Coordinates: 23°33′42″S 46°43′40″W
- Website: http://www.sbgeo.org.br/

The Sociedade Brasileira de Geologia is a technical and scientific society that aims brings to bring together Brazilian geologists, to disseminate technical and scientific information, and to participate in national decisions involving the geological sciences.

== Publications ==
The major publication of the society is the Brazilian Journal of Geology (formerly Revista Brasileira de Geociências) which is a quarterly publication established in 1971. It superseded the now defunct SBG Bulletin which had been published since 1952.

== Prizes ==
The society awards a number of prizes including the José Bonifácio de Andrada e Silva award (named after José Bonifácio de Andrada). This prize is awarded to honour those who have contributed to the development and advancement of geological knowledge and acted in the interests of the society.

=== José Bonifácio de Andrada e Silva Prize winners ===
- 2010 José Maria Landim Dominguez
- 2009 Carlos Schobbenhaus Filho
- 2008 Roberto Dall’Agnol
- 2007 Márcio Martins Pimentel
- 2006 Kenitiro Suguio
- 2005 Joachim Karfunkel
- 2004 Jorge Silva Bettencourt
- 2003 Reinhardt Adolfo Fuck
- 2002 Benjamin Bley de Brito Neves
- 2001 Hardy Jost
- 1998 Umberto Giuseppe Cordani
- 1997 Marcel Auguste Dardenne
- 1992 Bhaskara Rao Adusumilli
- 1988 Friedrich Wilhelm Sommer
- 1984 Francisco Celso Ponte
- 1982 Frederico Waldemar Lange
- 1980 Llewellyn Ivor Price
- 1978 Alberto Ribeiro Lamego
- 1977 José Moacyr Vianna Coutinho and Aluízio Licínio de Miranda Barbosa
- 1976 Jannes Markus Mabesoone
- 1975 Sérgio Mezzalira
- 1974 Heinz Ebert
- 1973 Francisco Moacyr de Vasconcelos and Irajá Damiani Pinto
- 1972 Karl Beurlen and Carlos Walter Marinho Campos
- 1971 Rui Ribeiro Franco
- 1970 Pedro de Moura
- 1969 Setembrino Petri
- 1968 Octávio Barbosa
- 1967 Reinhard Maack
- 1966 Djalma Guimarães, João José Bigarella, and José Raymundo de Andrade Ramos
- 1965 Wilhelm Kegel
- 1964 John Von Nostrand Dorr II and Carlos de Paula Couto
- 1963 Josué Camargo Mendes and Fernando Flávio Marques de Almeida
- 1962 Glycon de Paiva
- 1961 Luciano Jaques de Moraes
- 1960 Elysiário Távora Filho
- 1959 William D. Johnston Jr. and Sylvio Fróes de Abreu
- 1958 Avelino Ignácio de Oliveira, Otton Henry Leonardos, and Viktor Leinz
