= Dolar =

Dolar may refer to:

- Dólar, a municipality in the province of Granada, Spain
- Dolar (surname), a family name
- Dolar, a given name:
  - Dolar Mahmud (born 1988), Bangladeshi cricketer
  - Dolar Popat (born 1953), British politician

== See also ==
- Dollar, the name of more than 25 currencies
