= Robert John Pankhurst =

British geologist

Robert Pankhurst
- Education: University of Cambridge
- Known for: Contributions to the geology of Antarctica and South America
- Scientific career
- Fields: Geochronology, Geochemistry, Tectonics, Tectonostratigraphy
- Workplaces: British Geological Survey; British Antarctic Survey; University of Oxford

Robert John Pankhurst is a British geologist who has contributed to the study of the evolution and plate tectonics of Antarctica and South America. He has been a member of the Chilean Academy of Science since 2004. and the National Academy of Sciences of Argentina since 2005.

Robert (Bob) Pankhurst has authored or co-authored of hundreds scientific papers since 1970 and is a Visiting Research Associate at the British Geological Survey.

== See also ==
- Francisco Hervé
- Carlos Washington Rapela
- Víctor Alberto Ramos
- Benjamin Bley de Brito Neves
