= Mary Louise Rhodes =

American geologist (1916-1987)

- Born: April 5, 1916; Clinton, Missouri, US
- Died: June 26, 1987 (aged 71); Midland, Texas, US
- Education: University of Missouri
- Known for: Field Research in the Permian Basin
- Scientific career
- Fields: Petroleum Geology

Mary Louise Rhodes (April 5, 1916 – June 26, 1987), an American petroleum geologist, was born April 5, 1916, in Clinton, Missouri. She achieved a bachelor's degree (1938) and a master's degree (1939) in Geology at the University of Missouri. In 1942, Rhodes started her professional career in the production department at the Standard Oil Company of Texas (SOTEX), where she examined well samples, constructed sample logs, and prepared subservience maps and cross-sections. Later she transferred to the exploration department in 1946, she continued to work in this department for the rest of her career. Her duties in this department mainly included travelling the world to collect soil samples and collect to find oil reserves. Throughout her professional career, Rhodes became well known as a carbonate stratigrapher and an expert on several of the Permian basin rock units. Rhodes died on June 26, 1987, from cancer in Midland, Texas.

== Biography ==
Rhodes was born on April 5, 1916, in Clinton, Missouri but grew up in Humansville, Missouri. As Rhodes was pursuing a journalism degree, she had to take a science course as part of her degree's requirements. To satisfy this, she took a geology course, from where her interest in geology grew. She changed her major to geology after being inspired by Raymond E. Peck, who was a dedicated professor to her. After Rhodes changed her major to geology, she was taught by other well-known professors such as Edwin B Branson and Maurice G. Mehl. After graduation from the University of Missouri, Rhodes was active in the Jefferson Club, and she participated in several meetings of the University of Missouri Geology Department board for several years. With this job Rhodes examined well samples and constructed sample logs, prepared subsurface maps and cross sections, and recommended well locations to production management. Rhodes transferred to the Department of Exploration Geology in February 1946, and spent the rest of her career working on various exploration assignments. Through dedicated work and interest, She became a distinguished carbonate stratigrapher and was considered to be an expert on several of the Permian basin rock units. She was also known to have taught hundreds of earth scientists who worked in the petroleum industry. Rhodes and co-worker John Emery Adams shared an interest in Permian basin and were coauthors of two papers, Starved Pennsylvanian Midland Basin and Dolomitization by Seepage Refluxion. Rhodes was also awarded honorary life memberships in the Permian Basin Section of Society for Sedimentary Geology in 1974 and to the West Texas Geological Society in 1978. Rhodes retired in December 1977, and moved back from Denver to Midland. She died from cancer 26 June 1987 in Midland, Texas.

== Education ==
Rhodes graduated from Humansville High School in Missouri and after her high school graduation, Rhodes enrolled in the University of Missouri to undertake a degree in journalism. She achieved a bachelor's degree with distinction in 1938 and a master's degree in 1939 at the University of Missouri. While she studied at the University of Missouri she also acted as a teaching assistant for geology courses while pursuing her own education.

== Career ==
The Standard Oil Company of Texas (SOTEX) gave Rhodes the opportunity to begin her geological career in Houston Texas in April 1942. This would also become the company that would lead her to move to Midland Texas where she would eventually retire. Her official role would have been "production department staff". Rhodes began her career as a petroleum geologist by testing and analyzing well samples, constructing sample geologic logs, and producing "subsurface maps and cross-sections". Meaning, at her job the Standard Oil Company of Texas (SOTEX) she was essential for the production of oil, and her department in general. After working in the production department for 6 years, she transferred to the exploration department, in February 1946 Rhodes transferred into the exploration department of the Chevron Corporation. During this time Rhodes had completed many exploration assignments including in Abilene, San Angelo, Amarillo, Corpus Christi, Texas and Denver. She was well practiced and respected in the industry as a carbonate stratigrapher, as well as in the field of Permian basin rock units. The experience and knowledge gained first-hand working with Chevron Corporation allowed Rhodes to help educate hundreds in the field. While at Standard Oil Company of Texas, Mary would find others captivated with interests similar to hers. With her colleague, John Emery Adams, she helped produce papers on the Permian Basin. These papers garnered attention in her field of study, as well as influenced studies at other institutions. These papers were the "Starved Pennsylvanian Mid Land Basin", and "Dolomitization by Seepage Reflfauxion". Rhodes also published on the work she did. It is recognizable that she has seven publications that she co-wrote or was referenced on within the AAPG Bulletin. Examples of the papers she was referenced in is Wellman Field, Terry County, Texas and Exploratory Drilling in 1950.

== Personal life ==
Rhodes was a noted traveler during her time off, a passion she shared with her two sisters, Ann R. Bradshar of Fort Collins and Doris E. Munroe, who lived with Mary until her death. Rhodes never married, and she did not have any children. She studied and was a Teacher Advisor (TA) at the University of Missouri, where she received her bachelor's and master's degree in Geology.

== Awards ==
Throughout her career, Rhodes was an active member of Geology societies on both local and national levels. Her work and her contributions to the geology field were acknowledged and resulted in her being awarded an Honorary Life Membership in the Permian Basin Section of SEPM in 1974. Just four years later, she received equal recognition from the West Texas Geological Society.
