= Robbie Gries =

American petroleum geologist

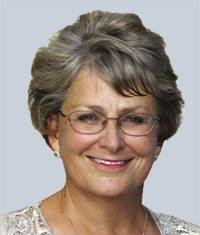
- Education: Del Mar College, Colorado State University, The University of Texas at Austin
- Children: Lynn
- Awards: Michel Halbouty Award (2012), Women Leader of Excellence Award (1997)
- Scientific career
- Fields: Petroleum Geologist
- Workplaces: Texaco, Priority Oil & Gas LLC

Robbie Rice Gries is an American petroleum geologist who was the first female president (2001–02) of the American Association of Petroleum Geologists (AAPG), president of the Geological Society of America (2018–19), and founder of Priority Oil & Gas LLC. Gries is noted to have made some influential progress for women in this field. In 2017, Gries published the book titled Anomalies—Pioneering Women in Petroleum Geology: 1917-2017. Gries is recognized as an unconventional thinker when approaching geological concepts and applications.

== Early life ==
Gries was born in San Antonio, Texas, in 1943 and her full birth name is Ruth Roberta Rice. She has used her nickname, Robbie, most of her life. Her father was a gulf shrimper and Robbie was delighted to collect marine fauna for her zoology classes from her father's boat. Gries, on vacations away from the Gulf Coast was fascinated with rocks and collected them on journeys, but never heard the word "geology" until she was a sophomore in college.

Gries graduated from Del Mar College, where she had her first geology courses and developed a passion for the science. She envisioned her next steps to be at the University of Texas but her junior credits would not transfer so she moved out of state to study at the Colorado State University where she was the first woman to graduate with a degree of geology. Gries then moved to The University of Texas, where she completed her master's degree.

During graduate school, Robbie Rice married John Charles Gries and had her first and only child (Lynn Margaret). After graduate school the Grieses moved to Wichita, Kansas, where he joined the geology faculty at Wichita State University.

== Career ==
Eventually divorcing, in 1973 Robbie Gries moved back to Colorado, and gained employment with Texaco, Inc. She was hired during the Affirmative Action push for oil companies to fulfill diversity employment plans and was nicknamed "token" in her office. Her areas of exploration included New Mexico, Colorado, and Wyoming. In 1977 she accepted a job with Reserve Oil and Gas in Denver. At that time she and the female geophysicist at Reserve became the first female members of the Denver Petroleum Club, breaking another barrier for women. The Denver Petroleum Club was the first such establishment in the US to accept female members. Gries, in 1980 became a consultant and was retained by Mabee Petroleum (Tulsa, Oklahoma), Amarex Petroleum (Oklahoma City), and Burnett Oil and Gas (Fort Worth) over the next ten years. In 1993 she facilitated a merger between Skaer Petroleum and Pease Oil and Gas and became an officer in the consolidated company. In 1994 she resigned and crafted her own startup; Priority Oil & Gas, LLC. Priority began buying oil and gas properties and new leases and was dedicated to exploring, operating and drilling, primarily in Kansas, Colorado, and Wyoming.

In 2001, Gries was elected president of AAPG. In this time, she visited 44 countries and led the development of international oil research.

Currently, Gries remains the president of her company.

== Awards and recognition ==
Gries has been an officer and committee chair for the Rocky Mountain Association of Geologists (RMAG). She received their Distinguished Service Award (1987), Honorary Membership (1989), and Special Humanitarian Award (2006).

Gries was a director for the Colorado Oil and Gas Association, Denver, Colorado, from 1993 to 2009. She was also a member of the Colorado and International Women's Forum from 1985 to 2009 and was president of the Colorado Forum in 1997. She received the Woman Leader of Excellence Award in 1997 from the Colorado Women's Leadership Coalition. In 2018 she selected as one of the Top Women in Energy by the Denver Business Journal.

The American Association of Petroleum Geologists (AAPG) has awarded her for Distinguished Service (1991), Honorary Membership (1998), the Leverson Award for best technical paper in the Rocky Mountain Section (1985). Prior to becoming the president of AAPG she chaired the Distinguished Lecture Committee and expanded it globally; chaired the Ethics Committee, created the Diversity Committee (now PROWESS), chaired the advisory committee, and was general chairman for the annual meeting in 1994 in Denver, Colorado. She is a trustee associate and a member of the corporate board for the AAPG Foundation. In 2012, Gries was awarded the Michel Halbouty Award for Outstanding Leadership. The award recognizes petroleum geologists who have displayed exceptional leadership and remarkable service in a corporation, research facility or academic institution. Gries is the first woman in history to have received the award.

Gries was one of the founders (2001) and officers of GeoScience World, McLean, Virginia, an internet resource for the geosciences, an electronic aggregate of geoscience journal publications and books made available globally to universities, corporations and individuals.

In 1997, the Colorado Women's Leadership Coalition awarded Gries with the Woman Leader of Excellence Award. This prestigious achievement signifies the impact she has made for women in her field. RMAG awarded her for technical papers or presentations in 1980, 1982, and 1986.

She is a Fellow, past treasurer and president-elect (2018–19) of the Geological Society of America.

== Publications ==
- Anomalies: Pioneering Women in Petroleum Geology (2017)
- Geology, Thermal Maturation, and Source Rock Geochemistry in a Volcanic Covered Basin: San Juan Sag, South-Central Colorado (1997)
- Seismic Exploration of the Rocky Mountain Region (1985)
- Oil and Gas Prospecting Beneath Precambrian of Foreland Thrust Plates in Rocky Mountains (1983)
- Mosher, Sharon and Robbie R. Gries, 2003, “GeoScience world: A multi-society aggregation of geoscience electronic journals, GSA abstract.
- Gries, R. R., 2002, “Are we ethical wimps, or are we prudent?”, Presidential Address, 2002 Annual Meeting, George R. Brown Convention Center, Houston, TX.
- Gries, R. R., 2001-2002, “Thinking out of the Box—the role of the geologist in keeping up with future energy demand”, presidential speech delivered in 44 countries.
- Gries, R. R. 1998, Financing an Acquisition—A geologist works through the maze of possibilities, (abs), AAPG Annual Meeting presentation, Salt Lake City, Utah.
- Gries, R. R., 1997, Hydrologist turns blind eye to facts in water rights case, San Luis Basin, South Central Colorado, (abs.), AAPG Annual Meeting panel presentation on ethics, Dallas, Tx.
- Gries, R. R., J. L. Clayton, and China Leonard, 1997, Geology, thermal maturation, and source rock geochemistry in a volcanic covered basin: San Juan Sag, South-Central Colorado, AAPG Bull. Vol.81, no. 7, p. 1133-1160.
- Watkins, T. A., J. S. Belcher, Robbie Gries, and M.B. Longacre, 1995, “Black Gold” leads to new structural interpretation, Northern Sangre de Cristo Mountains/Northeast San Luis Basin, Co. (abs), AAPG Bull., vol. 79, no. 6, p. 926.
- Watkins, T. A., J. S. Belcher, Robbie Gries, and M. B. Longacre, 1995, Integration of geology, non-seismic geophysics and seismic data in a structurally complex, frontier oil play: Northern Sangre de Cristo Mountains/Northeast San Luis Basin, Colorado, (abs.), AAPG Bull., vol. 79, no. 6, p. 926.
- Longacre, M. B., K. R. Christopherson, Robbie Gries, and T. A. Watkins, 1995, Non-seismic geophysics compared and integrated with seismic in a frontier oil play: Northern Sangre de Cristo Mountains/Northeast San Luis Basin, Colorado; (abs.), AAPG Bull., vol. 79, no. 6, p. 921. (Best Poster Award, Rocky Mountain Section-AAPG
- Brister, Brian and Robbie Gries, 1994, Tertiary stratigraphy and tectonic development of the Alamosa Basin (Northern San Luis Basin), Rio Grande Rift, South-Central Colorado; in Basins of the Rio Grande Rift: Structure, stratigraphy, and tectonic setting, eds. G. Randy Keller and Steven M. Cather, Geological Society of America Special Paper 291, pp. 39–59.
- Gries, Robbie, 1993, Stress management and personal growth, in Guiding Your Career as a Professional Geologist, P. R. Rose, editor, Division of Professional Affairs, American Association of Professional Geologists, p. 46-54.
- Gries, Robbie, John Dolson, and Robert Raynolds, 1992, Structural and stratigraphic evolution and hydrocarbon distribution, Rocky Mountain Foreland in Macqueen, R. W. and Leckie, D. A., eds., Foreland Basins and Fold Belts, AAPG Memoir 55, pp. 395–426.
- Gries, Robbie, 1991, AAPG celebrates 50 years of Distinguished Lectures, AAPG limited publication, 63p.
- Gries, R. R., and G. D. Vandersluis, 1989, Laramide and Cenozoic Geology Road Log from Denver, Colorado to Albuquerque, New Mexico; RMAG, 90 p.
- Gries, R. R., and B. S. Brister, 1989, New interpretation of seismic lines in the San Luis valley, south-central Colorado: in Harmon, E. J., ed., Water in the Valley, Colorado Ground Water Association, pp. 241–254.
- Gries, R. R., and J. L. Clayton, 1989, Source Rock Maturation, San Juan Sag (abs.): AAPG Bull. v. 73, no. 9, p. 1158.
- Gries, R. R., and J. L. Clayton, 1989, Petroleum geochemistry of the San Juan Sag (abs.): AAPG Bull., v. 73, no. 9, p. 1151.
- Gries, R. R., 1989, San Juan Sag: Oil and gas exploration in a newly discovered basin beneath the San Juan Volcanic Field: in Lorenz, J. L. and S. L. Lucas, eds., Albuquerque Geologic Society, p. 69-79.
- Gries, R. R., 1989, Rocky Mountain foreland structures: changes in compression direction through time: in Letouzy, J., ed., Petroleum and tectonics in Mobile Belts, Editions Technip/Paris, p. 129-148.
- Gries, R. R., and R. C. Dyer, 1985, editors, Seismic Exploration of the Rocky Mountain Region: Rocky Mountain Assoc. of Geologists, 300 p.
- Gries, R. R., 1985, Seismic Exploration of the Rocky Mountain Region, (abs.): AAPG Bull., v. 69, no. 5, p. 849.
- Gries, R. R., 1985, Oil-bearing sediments beneath San Juan volcanics—Colorado's newest frontier (abs.): AAPG Bull., v. 69, no. 5, p. 849.
- Gries, R. R., 1985, Oil-bearing sediments beneath San Juan volcanics—Colorado's newest frontier: The Mountain Geologist, v. 22, no. 3, pp. 1–23.
- Gries, R. R., 1985, Seismic lines in the San Luis Valley, South Central Colorado: in Gries, R. R. and Dyer, R. C., eds, Seismic Exploration of the Rocky Mountain Region: RMAG, p. 267-274.
- Gries, R. R., 1983, Oil and gas prospecting beneath the Precambrian of foreland thrust plates in the Rocky Mountains: AAPG Bull., v. 67, p. 1-28.
- Gries, R. R., 1983, North-south compression of Rocky Mountain foreland structures, in Lowell, J. D., Rocky Mountain foreland basins and uplifts symposium: Rocky Mountain Association of Geologists, p. 9-32.
- Gries, R. R., 1983, Petroleum exploration contributes to structural knowledge of Rocky Mountain foreland deformation (abs.): AAPG Bull., v. 67, no. 8, p. 1339-1340.
- Gries, R. R., R. R. Ray, and J. W. Babcock, 1983, Acoustic velocities, synthetic seismograms, and lithologies of thrusted Precambrian rocks, in Lowell, J. D., Rocky Mountain foreland basins and uplifts symposium: RMAG, p. 125-135.
- Gries, R. R., 1982, North-south compression of the Rocky Mountain foreland (abs.): AAPG Bull., v. 66, no. 5, p. 574.
- Gries, R. R., 1981, Oil and gas prospecting beneath the Precambrian of foreland thrust plates in the Rocky Mountains: The Mountain Geologist, v. 18, no. 1, p. 1-18.
- Gries, R. R., 1980, Oil and gas potential of the San Luis Basin, South Central Colorado, (abs.): AAPG Bull., v. 64, no. 5, p. 714.
- Gries, R. R., 1970, Biostratigraphy of Carboniferous rocks, San Saba County, Central Texas (abs.): AAPG Bull, v. 54, no. 6.
