= Brazilian Journal of Geology =

- Discipline: Geology, Earth sciences
- Language: English, Portuguese, Spanish
- Edited by: Claudio Riccomini

Publication details
- Former names: Revista Brasileira de Geociências, Boletim da Sociedade Brasileira de Geologia
- History: 1971–present
- Publisher: Sociedade Brasileira de Geologia (Brazil)
- Frequency: Quarterly
- Open access: Yes
- Impact factor: 1.59 (2018)

Standard abbreviations
- ISO 4: Braz. J. Geol.

Indexing
- ISSN: 2317-4889 (print); 2317-4692 (web)

Links
- Journal homepage; Manuscript Submission; Online archive at SBG site; Journal page at SciELO

Brazilian Journal of Geology (formerly Revista Brasileira de Geociências) is a quarterly peer-reviewed scientific journal published by the Sociedade Brasileira de Geologia, Brazil's main geology society. The journal covers the field of geology and related earth sciences, in Brazil, South America, and Antarctica, including oceanic regions adjacent to these regions. The journal was established in 1971 and articles are published in English and Portuguese. The journal replaced the Boletim da Sociedade Brasileira de Geologia established in 1952. The journal is sponsored by Petrobras.
