= Dolar (surname) =

Dolar is a surname. Notable people with the surname include:

- Davorin Dolar (1921–2005), Slovene chemist
- Joannes Baptista Dolar (1620–1673), Slovene composer
- Ljudmila Dolar Mantuani (1906–1988), Slovene petrologist
- Mladen Dolar (born 1951), Slovene philosopher
- Tomaž Dolar (born 1966), Slovene ski jumper
