= Edith Merritt McKee =

American geologist

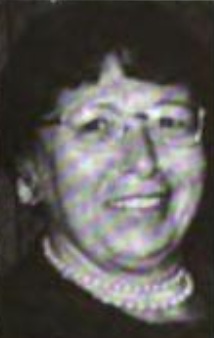
- Edith Merritt McKee, from a 1976 publication of the US Commerce Department
- Born: October 9, 1918; Oak Park, Illinois
- Died: October 3, 2006 (aged 87); Harbor Springs, Michigan
- Citizenship: US
- Education: Northwestern University (B.S.), University of Chicago (Master's degree, Geology)
- Known for: first woman to work in Saudi oil fields
- Scientific career
- Fields: Geology, Petrology
- Institutions: Aramco, National Geographic Society, Smithsonian Institution and Encyclopædia Britannica

Edith Merritt McKee (October 9, 1918 – August 3, 2006) was an American geologist.

== Early life and education ==
McKee was born in Oak Park, Illinois. Her parents were Eustis Ewart and Edith McKee. She grew up in Illinois and Northern Michigan.

She graduated from Northwestern University in 1946, and received a master's degree in Geology from the University of Chicago.

== Later life ==
During World War II McKee worked for the U.S. Department of Defense to develop maps and profiles of land formations to help the military develop attack plans and bombardments.

She was a member of the American Association of Petroleum Geologists and a member of the Geological Society of America.

McKee was the first woman to work in the oil fields of Saudi Arabia. After she had finished working the oil fields, she became a geological consultant for National Geographic, Smithsonian Institution and Encyclopædia Britannica. Prior to electronic methods of navigation, one of her projects was creating subsurface maps of Lake Michigan and Lake Superior to be used for navigation and to chart the water currents in the lakes. Her research demonstrated vegetation and sea life along the shores of Northern Michigan were affected due to the warm water discharge from the power plant in Charlevoix.
