= Fanny Carter Edson =

American Geologist

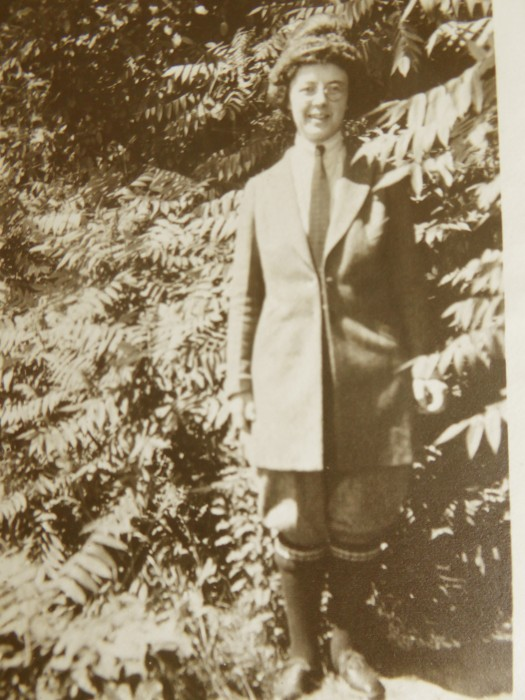
- Fanny Edson in field clothes
- Born: Fanny Carter; October 5, 1887; Chicago, Illinois
- Died: June 10, 1952 (aged 64)
- Education: University of Wisconsin
- Occupation: petroleum geologist
- Known for: pre-Cambrian geology, stratigraphy
- Notable work: field laboratory facility in Tulsa, Oklahoma
- Spouse: Frank Aaron Edson (div. 1923)
- Children: one daughter
- Parents: Byron Beach Carter (father); Cora Belle Albridge Carter (mother)
- Awards: Fellow, Geological Society of America

Fanny Carter Edson (October 5, 1887 – June 10, 1952) was an American petroleum geologist, She graduated from the University of Wisconsin in 1910 and returned to further specialize in Precambrian geology, earning her master's degree in 1913.

Along with her specialization in pre-Cambrian geology, Edson focused on stratigraphic correlations. Her area of work required the use of well samples which were used at this point in geological history as more advanced technology, such as electric logs, were just on the verge of being discovered.

== Early life ==
Born Fanny Carter in Chicago, Illinois, on October 5, 1887, she was one of the three daughters of Byron Beach Carter and Cora Belle Albridge Carter. Her father, Byron Beach Carter, graduated from the University of Wisconsin as a mechanical engineer. Throughout his career, he was well known for his machinery designs. He was “the designer of machinery for great railroads bridges including several across Mississippi River.” Her mother, Cora Belle Albridge, also attended State University becoming a member of the women's organization, Kappa Kappa Gamma. From both her paternal and maternal side, Carter Edson's ancestry was English. On her paternal side her great-grandparents immigrated to Wisconsin in 1850, while on her maternal side, her family immigrated in 1688.

== Education ==
In 1906, Fanny Carter began her post-secondary education at the University of Wisconsin. Much like her mother, she also joined the women's organization, Kappa Kappa Gamma, and in 1910, she completed her degree specializing in geology. Three years later, Carter Edson returned to the University of Wisconsin to finish her master's degree.

== Employment ==
She began her career as a Geologist at the Ecogal Exploration Company. Edson joined Roxana Petroleum Corporation, which was a subdivision of the Royal Dutch/Shell Group, in her early years as a geologist in 1924. Edson established the corporation's sample lab to aid in the growing North American Mid-Continent drilling area. Her career at Roxana Petroleum Corporation ended in 1938, the same year she was chosen to be a Fellow of the Geological Society of America. After her time at Roxana Petroleum Corporation ended she found employment as the Chief Geologist at the Cimmaron Oil Company beginning in 1939.

== Field of study and research focus ==
Fanny Carter went to Wisconsin University for her master's degree, to then rejoin her husband. She worked at his company as an advisory geologist and then eventually a secretary-treasurer, which was not a part of her field. She went back to school again at Stanford university she became a graduate student instructor in the geology school. After taking many years of school for geology, and with special training and experience she began working in September 1924, with Roxana Petroleum corporation, that is now a part of the Shell Oil Company.

Mrs. Edson initially worked on the liberal latitude for Roxana, this means she was responsible for examining the samples from the well of subsurface sediments and create a stratigraphy “map” of the layers of sediment. Fanny's work with the samples from the well and her stratigraphy sequences was helping the company's understanding of the subsurface Ordovician stratigraphy.

Under Fanny's supervision the lab staff grew in numbers and they began to be known for their volume and authentic character of their stratigraphic work, and also being the most efficient in the region. In 1932, Fanny Carter Edson received a signal honor, although she did not have numerous writings, she was the first women of commercial employment. She was the one woman elected that year to the fellowship in the Geological Society of America, which at that time was exclusive and only included 10 other women. Fanny Carter was a petroleum geologist and was a member of the American Association of Petroleum Geologists for 30 years.

== Contribution to geology ==
Edson's work was predominantly in the field of petroleum geology. Among her many contributions to her field she established a field laboratory facility in Tulsa, Oklahoma, that examined well samples of subsurface sediments and devised methods of strati-graphic correlation and other practical applications of her findings. Her laboratory work was supplemented by field examination of outcrop sections in Oklahoma, and by participation in the wide-ranging field conferences through the Arbuckle and the Ozark mountains, the Missouri and the Mississippi river valleys, and along the Rocky Mountain front. Edson's work with the well samples and the strati-graphic sequences guided her company's understanding of the subsurface Ordovician stratigraphy. Further, her determinations and mapping of the subsurface pre-Mississippian rocks yielded for her company an accurate outline of the newly recognized Central Kansas uplift.

== Personal life ==
Fanny Carter Edson was married to Frank Aaron Edson, whose work in iron-ore exploration made them travel in 1917 to Duluth, Minnesota where they had their daughter in June. While the United States had entered the First World War, the duties of Fanny's husband with the Y.M.C.A. Field Service took him to various army training camps, while Fanny remained in Duluth. For three years she filled various clerical positions, and taught general science for one semester in public schools. Fanny and her daughter joined her husband in 1921 at Norman, Oklahoma, where he was employed on the Oklahoma Geological Survey. She continued and furthered her studies there for a few years. Now versed in geology, and with special training and experience in pre-Cambrian stratigraphy and structure, North American Mid-Continent geology, mineralogy and petrography, and phases of subsurface exploration, Fanny Carter Edson accepted employment with the Roxana Petroleum Corporation (now part of the Shell Oil Company) in September, 1924, at Tulsa. There, she became solely responsible for the personal rearing of her daughter when she and her husband divorced in 1923. There she began the application of her science and her most rigorous studies to the vocation in which she was enthralled for the remainder of her life.

== Achievements ==
Nearing the end of her career, Edson was employed at the U.S. Geological Survey (1942–1945). In addition to her fellowship at the Geological Society of American she was also a prominent member of the American Association of Petroleum Geologists and the Stratigraphic Society of Tulsa, Oklahoma.
