= Marie Morisawa =

American geomorphologist

- Born: November 2, 1919; Toledo, Ohio
- Died: June 10, 1994 (aged 74)
- Education: B.S. in mathematics, Hunter College, 1941; M.A. in theology; M.S. in Geology, University of Wyoming, 1952; Ph.D., from Columbia University, 1960
- Known for: Founded the journal Geomorphology in 1986; author of eight books
- Scientific career
- Fields: Geomorphology
- Workplaces: Bryn Mawr College, 1955-1959
- Doctoral advisor: Arthur Newell Strahler

Marie Morisawa (November 2, 1919 – June 10, 1994) was an American geomorphologist. Morisawa was an integral part of the revolution in the field that began in the 1950s. She studied the geomorphology of rivers, active fault zones, plate tectonics, coastal geomorphology, geological hazards, and environmental geomorphology.

== Early life and education ==
Morisawa was born on November 2, 1919, and died in a single-car accident on June 10, 1994. She was born in Toledo, Ohio, to a Japanese father and an American mother. She earned a B.S. in mathematics from Hunter College in 1941, with a minor in chemistry. She then earned an M.A. in theology before turning to geology and obtaining an M.S. from University of Wyoming in 1952. She taught at Bryn Mawr College from 1955 to 1959. In 1960 she earned her Ph.D. from Columbia University. Arthur Newell Strahler was the advisor for her doctoral work on the quantitative geomorphology of Pennsylvania streams. Morisawa's desire to understand the natural world becomes apparent when considering her varied academic pursuits. She had a love for plants, animals, the beauty and aesthetic value of landscapes.

== Career ==
Morisawa became an assistant professor in 1959 at the University of Montana. After that from 1961 to 1962 she was employed in Washington, D.C., by the U.S. Geological Survey. She continued her career as a professor from 1963 to 1969 at Antioch College.

Morisawa was the councillor for the Geological Society of America and the American Quaternary Association. As well, Morisawa was the chair member for the Quaternary Geology and Geomorphology Division of the Geological Society of America multiple times.

Due to Marie's national and international reputations, scientists from all over the world congregated to Binghamton for their sabbatical studies. In 1987-1988 she had a Fulbright Award to lecture in India. She became a geologist-in-residence in 1990 at Carlton after being sought after by multiple universities. In Binghamton, she donated her services by helping in the managing of the environment. This continued service led to Morisawa being a key contributor in writing master plan for the Town of Vestal, New York.

Morisawa joined her discipline in 1960, at that time few women were involved in research and university-level science teaching. She was the first female chair of the QG&G division (quaternary geology & geomorphology), and mentored younger scientists all throughout her career.

During her career in Binghamton, New York, Morisawa always kept the door open for her students to join lunches where discussions took place on the different factors of the state of geology as well as geomorphology. Marie loved to teach and engage with her students on geological discussions.

Morisawa wrote eight books, including Evaluating Riverscapes in 1971. She founded the journal Geomorphology in 1986 and was its editor in chief. She became "the first female chair" of the Quaternary Geology and Geomorphology Division of the Geological Society of America and helped found "the annual Binghamton Geomorphology Symposia." To recognize her research and educational achievements she received the Outstanding Educator Award from the Association of Women Geoscientists in 1992.

== Research ==
Marie Morisawa was part of the geomorphology revolution in the 1950s and 1960s. This work involves measuring both slopes and stream channels and understanding the relationship they have on larger scale impacts. Marie worked on talus slopes in the Rocky Mountains doing research involving geomorphology. Morisawa was also one of the founders of environmental geomorphology.

Geomorphic changes caused by the 1959 Hebgen Lake earthquake in Montana played a significant role in the start of her research. The earthquake remains provided an ideal outdoor laboratory for Morisawa's studies on the initiation of drainage systems. This work produced several abstracts including the 1964 article publication in the American Journal of Science.

In 1976 Morisawa presented her research on riverscape preferences at the first northeastern women's geoscientists conference at St. Lawrence University. Her research determined which characteristics of riverscapes are valued by certain demographics of the population through a ratings system that determined factors of beauty.

Morisawa furthered her research on watersheds and geomorphology, publishing the article Quantitative Geomorphology of Some Watersheds in the Appalachian Plateau. Her research included looking at the geologic structure of the watershed basins in the Appalachian Plateau, and how other interactions affect the streamflow and geomorphology of the basins. The stratigraphy or specifically sequence stratigraphy of basins include anticlines that have been eroded over time and the outer edges of the basin defined with steep scarps. The strata in these basins change over time and these changes can affect direction or velocity of streamflow.

== Grants and awards ==
Throughout the years, Morisawa received many grants, following the successful geomorphic and geological research she produced. Organizations such as: The National Science Foundation, The US Department of Commerce Sea Grant Program, The United States Geological Survey, Ford Foundation, and The Office of Water Resources provided the funding Morisawa required to continue her research.

In 2006 the Geological Society of America established the Marie Morisawa Award in her honor. The award is presented annually to a woman M.S. or Ph.D. graduate student pursuing a career in geomorphology.^{[6]} It was first awarded in 2009 to Jill Onken from the University of Arizona.^{[7]}

== Selected publications ==
- Quantitative geomorphology of some watersheds in the Appalachian Plateau: Geological Society of America Bulletin, v. 73,4. 1025–1046.
- Distribution of streamflow direction in drainage systems: Journal of Geology, v. 71, p. 528-529.
- The Wasatch fault zone—general aspects, in Environmental geology of the Wasatch front, 1971: Salt Lake City, Utah Geological Association, p. D1-D17.
- Plate tectonics and geomorphology, in Recent researches in geology: Delhi India, University of Delhi, Department of Geology, p. 269-282.
- The aesthetics of river scenery, in Women in Geology: Canton, New York, St. Lawrence University, p. 69-77.

== Books ==
- Our Geologic Environment as well as Streams: Their Dynamics and Morphology in 1968.
- Rivers: Form and Process in 1971
- Geomorphology Laboratory Manual in 1977
- Morisawa, Marie (1968). Rhodes W. Fairbridge (ed.). Classification of Rivers. New York: Reinhold Book Corporation. pp. 956–957. OCLC 2968.
