= Octávio Barbosa =

Brazilian geologist

Octávio Barbosa (April 29, 1907 – January 31, 1997) was a Brazilian geologist.

== Early life ==
Barbosa was born in Ituverava, where he lived with his parents on a farm until he was 13 years old. He learned to read at the age of five, and had his secondary education at schools in Ribeirão Preto. Octávio Barbosa graduated from the Universidade Federal de Ouro Preto (UFOP) in civil engineering and mining. In the early 1930s, he worked in the Geological and Mineralogical Survey of Brazil (SGMB), which, in 1936, became the National Department of Mineral Production (DNPM).

== Personal life ==
He married Beatriz de Lima Vieira on April 19, 1933, in Belo Horizonte, MG, Brazil. His second wife, Vera Rita de Castro Dias, a geographer educated at the University of São Paulo, collaborated on many of his geomorphological works. He has a son and four grandchildren. From his first marriage, until August 1954, had five children, 10 grandchildren and six great-grandchildren.

== Career ==
In 1932, he joined the Polytechnic School of São Paulo, where he taught for 16 years. At the age of 48, he went to work for Prospec in Petropolis, where he developed consulting activities. In 1977, he joined the CPRM, currently the Geological Survey of Brazil.

He has published over 200 scientific papers and trained hundreds of engineers and geologists. Octávio Barbosa attended the first board meeting of the Brazilian Geological Society, serving as vice president alongside Luciano Jacques de Moraes. He conducted numerous works in field geology and mineral prospecting, showing an appreciation for indigenous terms, which were also useful in physiographic descriptions and interpretations in Brazil.

Octávio Barbosa spent six years in the Geological Survey as a research assistant to Luciano Jacques de Moraes, with whom he co-authored some works. He was later appointed Director of the Current Development Division of Mineral Production, a position he held until 1940. During this time, he conducted various studies, including the examination of phonolite in Lages, Santa Catarina in 1933, the description of rocks and geology in the former Federal District encompassing Rio de Janeiro, and investigations into nickel (1935), iron (especially in Santa Catarina), manganese, and groundwater studies in Minas Gerais (1938–1940). Additionally, he explored pre-Devonian formations in 1936, and in 1938, he published work on aquamarine, bismuth, and tantalum deposits. His research also delved into gold, with a specific focus on the Gold Caeté in 1939, and he outlined initial geological concepts regarding the Reconcavo Baiano in the same year.

In 1938, Octávio Barbosa engaged in a well known controversy within the Brazilian Academy of Sciences, criticizing the protognaisse theory proposed by Alberto Ribeiro Lamego. In 1940, he published a groundbreaking work on mine hygiene that foreshadowed the field of Environmental Geology, highlighting unfavorable conditions at the Morro Velho Mine and anticipating modern concepts. That same year, he studied the glacial striations of the permo-carboniferous Paraná Basin. In 1940, he was invited to assume the position of Chair of Geology at the Polytechnic School of USP, where he served as a Professor for 16 years. In 1949, he co-authored a work with his assistant, Fernando Flávio Marques de Almeida, focusing on the Tubarão and Ribeira regions. From 1941 to 1943, he studied the magnesite mine at Serra das Éguas in Bahia. He also served as a consultant for the Perus Cement Factory, overseeing the mining of limestone, clay, and magnesite. In 1953, he specialized in granitization and in 1954, he contributed a note on geology for tunnels and dams. In 1956, he left the Polytechnic School São Paulo to work as a consultant for the company Prospec in Petrópolis. Subsequently, he actively participated in various national and international congresses and symposia, engaging in geological mapping projects and economic geology initiatives. One of his initial projects involved the "Project Araguaia," focusing on a photogeological survey between the rivers Tocantins, Araguaia, and Xingu.

The literature reports studies on the coal basin of the Tocantins and descriptions of volcanic events in Brazil, Peru and Mexico (both 1957). That same year he published an essay on the chimney alkaline and carbonatite. His interest in this subject dates back to 1934 and 1936 when he commented on the chimney of Poços de Caldas (and also in 1948). Barbosa published several papers on geomorphology, one of his early interests in the field. From 1952 to 1958, he published works on paleobotany, establishing the age of Gondwana floras and making observations (in 1957) on the Paratoxopitys Americana, a fossil wood from the Irati Formation.

His interest in diamonds was evident since 1938 when he studied the diamond "Minas Gerais" in Coromandel, sparking a lasting academic interest. Continuing his diamond studies while at Prospec, he explored diamonds in western Minas Gerais. In 1977, after 21 years at Prospec, he joined the cadre of the CPRM, where he served as a consultant.

Barbosa conducted geological surveys and mineral registry panels to the west of the São Francisco River and the eastern Tocantins River, covering areas in Goiás, Minas Gerais and the current Distrito Federal. He studied tin ores in Rio Palma and nickel in Barro Alto, estimating 120 million tons of ore weathering. Additionally, he investigated gold deposits in the basin of the Ribeira basin south of São Paulo. and researched the geological formations of the Brazilian Northeast. In his later years, he focused on platinum research in the states of Pernambuco, Bahia, São Paulo, and Goiás.

== Recognition and legacy ==
Octávio Barbosa received numerous accolades, awards, and honors. In 1974, he was awarded the Medal of Merit Mineral. In 1968, the Brazilian Geological Society (SBG) bestowed upon him the highest honor for geologists in Brazil, the Gold Medal José Bonifácio. He emphasized on multiple occasions the importance for professionals to find happiness in pursuing their passions and fulfilling their aspirations through their work. Octávio Barbosa advocated for being at ease with improvisations, mandatory fieldwork, and utilizing various modes of transportation such as jeeps, airplanes, small planes, helicopters, mules, trucks, boats, and any other conceivable means of locomotion. He consistently encouraged the younger generation to embrace these experiences. "Love life of the field and like to travel, by any possible means of locomotion." His love of geology made him declare often that will live with a hammer in his hand until the last day of his life.

Much remains to be done, geology and mining in Brazil. Although the current labor market and demand for services to geology are still very scarce, I believe (says Octávio Barbosa) that this situation will change because in large countries such as South Africa, Canada, the United States, Russia and others, where the geology was well developed, still discover new things. In spite of all that is known, is a world to discover . The Amazon, for example, which is unknown, is a true Canadian. Therefore, I believe there will, therefore, an incentive for the present, even the new geologists, come here to toil in their specialties"

— Octavio Barbosa

== Death ==
Octávio Barbosa died on January 31, 1997, in Petrópolis, RJ. His geological knowledge is recorded in hundreds of papers published as reports, books, and journal articles which are incorporated in the Library of CPRM, Geological Survey of Brazil in Rio de Janeiro. The Library was named Library Octávio Barbosa and his works are accessible to the public free of charge. It contains a specialized collection in Geosciences, comprising papers, books, national and international journals, technical reports, maps, aerial photographs, and various photocartographic documents for community access. Additionally, CPRM holds some invaluable field notebooks penned by Octávio Barbosa during the 1930s and 1950s, capturing his insights, adventures, knowledge, and significant contributions to the Geology of Brazil.

== Sources ==
Texts summarized page of CPRM and the homage done by geologist Professor J. R de Andrade Ramos to eminent Brazilian geologist Octávio Barbosa, on the occasion of the Third Symposium on Geology of the Southeast (1993), Rio de Janeiro-RJ, Brazil.
