= Karl von Seebach =

German geologist

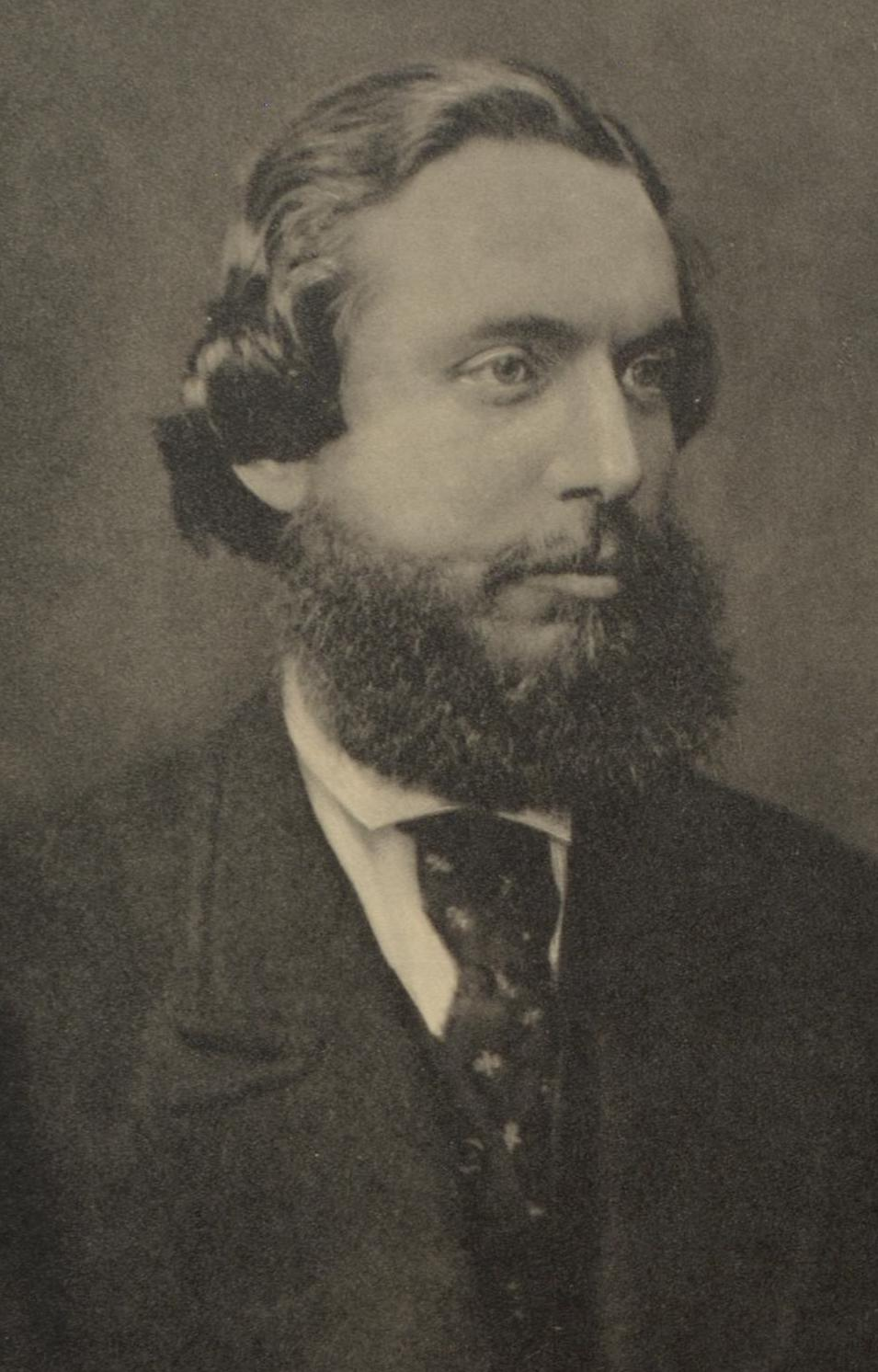

Karl Albert Ludwig von Seebach (13 August 1839, Weimar – 21 January 1880, Göttingen) was a German geologist known for his studies in the field of volcanology.

He studied geology and paleontology at Breslau as a pupil of Ferdinand von Roemer, with whom he took a scientific journey to Russia. He also studied at the Universities of Göttingen and Berlin, where he was a student of Heinrich Ernst Beyrich. In 1862 he obtained his doctorate at Göttingen with a thesis on conch-fauna of the Weimar Triassic. In 1870 he became a full professor at Göttingen and subsequently chosen as the first director of the geological-palaeontological institute.

His earlier research dealt with stratigraphical geology and paleontology, and he dedicated much of his time to the preparation of a geological chart of the Kingdom of Hanover. In 1864 he embarked on a trip to Central America, where he investigated the volcanic phenomena of the region. In 1866 he had the opportunity to witness firsthand, volcanic eruptions in the Aegean Sea (Kameni islands, Santorini caldera).

Seebach's personal library was purchased for the geological-palaeontological institute at Göttingen shortly after his death. The mineral "seebachite" (synonym of chabazite) is named in his honor.

== Selected works ==
- Originalkarte des nordwestlichen Theiles von Costarica zur Übersicht der Reisen, 1865.
- Ueber den Vulkan von Santorin und die Eruption von 1866, 1867 – On the Santorini volcano and its 1866 eruption.
- Ueber die Wellen des Meeres und ihre geologische Bedeutung, 1872 – The waves of the sea and their geological significance.
- Central-Amerika und der interoceanische Canal, 1873 – Central America and the interoceanic canal.
- Ueber Vulkane Centralamerikas, 1892 – On Central American volcanoes.
