= Ronald Ringsrud =

American gemologist

- Ringsrud
- Born: May 7, 1951 (age 75)
- Occupations: Emerald dealer, gemologist, author

Ronald Ringsrud is an American emerald dealer, gemologist, and author of Emeralds, A Passionate Guide.

== Gemology ==
Ringsrud has a background in emerald gemology and the world emerald market. He has given presentations and lectures on the topic since 1986. As the owner of Ronald Ringsrud Company, he was the host and guide in Bogotá, Colombia, for foreign buyers visiting the city's emerald marketplace, as well as guiding groups from the L.A. County Museum of Natural History and the Gemological Institute of America (GIA) on their trips to the Colombian emerald source.

Ringsrud has published three articles in the GIA's journal Gems and Gemology. He was a speaker at the GIA's International Gemological Symposium in 1991. In 2006, he presented at the GIA Gemological Research Conference in San Diego, California on the topic of "Subjectivity in Gemology". Ringsrud has sat on the board of directors of the American Gem Trade Association (AGTA).

He is also involved in charitable activities in Colombia aiming to assist people in the mining area.

== Emeralds, A Passionate Guide ==
Emeralds, A Passionate Guide is a 2009 non-fiction work published by Ringsrud's Green View Press, billed as an "adventure into the unique world of emeralds". In addition to the textual combination of anecdotes and scientific facts, this guide contains 70 microphotos and over 250 color photos and illustrations. The book includes a foreword written by John Koivula, the Chief Gemologist at the GIA.

Screenwriter Diane Lake described Emeralds, A Passionate Guide as "a book [that] glistens and gleams—that fairly sparkles with its intensity". The reviewer for pricescope.com stated that: "The subtitle of Ronald Ringsrud's new book A Passionate Guide, The Emeralds, The People, Their Secrets has been well selected. The book is not just about an emerald, more specifically a Colombian emerald; it is about a country, its people and one man's love affair with it all". The book has received other positive reviews.

== Works ==
- Emeralds A Passionate Guide ISBN 978-0-9822627-5-7
- Medellin Colombia and the Prophesies of Joaquim of Fiore ISBN 978-1-7923-5532-5
