= Benjamin Bley de Brito Neves =

Brazilian geologist

- Born: 1941 (age 84–85)
- Education: University of Recife
- Known for: Contributions to the geology of South America
- Awards: José Bonifácio de Andrada e Silva Prize (2002)
- Scientific career
- Fields: Tectonostratigraphy, Tectonics, Paleogeography, Structural geology
- Workplaces: Sudene; Federal University of Pernambuco; University of São Paulo

Benjamin Bley de Brito Neves (born 1941) is a Brazilian geologist who has contributed to the paleogeography and plate tectonics of South America. Brito Neves is member of Sociedade Brasileira de Geologia, National Water Well Association and the Geological Society of America. He is member of the Brazilian Academy of Sciences.
