= Jin Qingmin =

Chinese geologist

Jin Qinming (Chinese: 金庆民; pinyin: Jīn Qìngmín; 1939–1999) was a Chinese geologist. She was the first female member of the Hami Geological Team. She worked for 20 years in the vast Gobi Desert and the steep and precipitous Kunlun Mountains, and discovered for the first time the "breccia field peridotite" in Bachu Wajir Tagar in the Tarim Basin, which provided an important basis for the Xinjiang Geological Bureau to find the diamond mine later on. She is China's first female geologist to go deep into the Antarctic hinterland for an expedition.

== Early life ==
Qinming was born in 1939 in Sanhe Township, Yanling County, Hunan Province. She graduated from the Beijing Geological Institute in 1961.

== Career ==
She visited the South Pole three times. Qinming dedicated her entire life in gathering data for Chinese geological department.

== Death ==
In 1999, Jin Qinming died due to an illness.
