= Edelmira Inés Mórtola =

Argentine geologist (1894–1973)

Edelmira Inés Mórtola (21 January 1894 – 28 May 1973) was the first woman to become a geologist in Argentina and the first woman to obtain a PhD in Natural Sciences with a focus on Geology (1921) from the University of Buenos Aires (UBA). She was a prominent researcher in the field of mineralogy and an influential university professor. The Mineralogy Museum at UBA was named after her.

== Biography ==
Mórtola was born in Berazategui and attended secondary school between 1908 and 1912 at the National High School for Young Ladies in Buenos Aires, Argentina. She later graduated with a degree in Geology from the Faculty of Exact and Natural Sciences of the University of Buenos Aires. For her first career position, she was as a geological assistant at the General Directorate of Mines and Geology from 1918 to 1924, becoming the first professional woman to work in the institution. In 1921 she obtained her doctorate from the Faculty of Exact and Natural Sciences of the UBA, receiving a gold medal and a diploma of honor. Her thesis was titled Basic Alkaline Rocks of Southern Chubut.

=== Teaching ===
She had an extensive teaching career. At first she worked as a teacher at the National High School for Young Ladies No. 1 and at the Joaquín V. González National Teachers' Institute. In 1924, she became an official member of the Mineralogy Department at the Faculty of Exact and Natural Sciences of the University of Buenos Aires as Head of Practical Work.

At UBA, she taught Mineralogy and Petrography in the department of Natural Sciences, and Chemistry and Civil Engineering at the department of Exact Sciences. Eventually, she was named a full professor and trained numerous researchers.

=== Legacy ===
Mórtola devoted herself to the organization of the Mineralogy and Petrography Cabinet until 1960, which ten years later was transformed into the Mineralogy Museum in the Geology Department of the Faculty of Exact and Natural Sciences of the UBA. It was later named Dra. Edelmira Mórtola Museum in her honor. Mineral samples that Mórtola collected in Patagonia during her doctoral research are preserved there.

She was highly recognized in her specialty, and maintained regular correspondence with numerous scientists including Bernardo Houssay, co-recipient of the 1947 Nobel Prize for Physiology or Medicine.

In 1930, she published the book Notions of Mineralogy, based on her extensive teaching experience. The book had a great impact on the training of future professionals in the discipline because it showed photographic illustrations and a key to help readers identify Argentine minerals.

She retired from the university in 1960 and died on 28 May 1973 in Buenos Aires.

== Distinctions ==
- Strobel Prize in 1918, for her distinguished doctoral studies
- Appointed Honorary Delegate to the Exhibition “Women in National Life” by the Rectorate of the UBA in 1941
- Scientist highlighted by National Scientific and Technical Research Council, the largest science institution in Argentina, in its "Women in Science" exhibition
