= Kay-Christian Emeis =

German geologist and an academic

- Occupations: Geologist and academic

Academic background
- Education: Diploma in Geology (1982); PhD (1985); Habilitation in Geology (1993)
- Alma mater: Universität Hamburg (UHH); University of Kiel
- Thesis: Black shales and organic-rich sediments of the Atlantic Ocean: Reconstruction of depositional environments at DSDP Sites 530, 532 and 603

Kay-Christian Emeis is a German geologist and an academic. He is a retired professor in the Department of Earth Sciences at Universität Hamburg (UHH) in Germany.

Emeis' research centers on geochemistry and isotope geochemistry in both ancient and modern environments, with a particular emphasis on oxygen-deficient settings. His scientific contributions include clarifying the paleoclimatic and paleoceanographic record of the Mediterranean Sea during the Pleistocene, characterizing the geochemical and isotopic profiles of upwelling environments, and tracing eutrophication in coastal seas using stable isotope signatures of nitrogen.

== Education and early career ==
Emeis studied geology and paleontology at the UHH, earning a diploma in geology in 1982. He completed his PhD at Universität Hamburg in 1985 with a dissertation titled "Black Shales and Organic-Rich Sediments of the Atlantic Ocean: Reconstruction of Depositional Environments at DSDP Sites 530, 532, and 603." Following his doctoral studies, he worked for four years as a staff scientist at the Ocean Drilling Program (ODP) and held the position of adjunct assistant professor at Texas A&M University in College Station, Texas. Over the course of 1989 to 1993, he was an assistant professor at the Geological Institute of Kiel University. After completing his habilitation there in 1993, he was appointed deputy director of the Department of Marine Geology at the Leibniz Institute for Baltic Sea Research in Warnemünde and was named professor of marine geology and geochemistry at the University of Greifswald.

== Career ==
In 2003, Emeis joined the Universität Hamburg as a full professor of biogeochemistry. From 2011 to 2021, he led the Biogeochemistry in Coastal Seas Department as director and head at Helmholtz Zentrum Geesthacht (HZG, now Hereon). He was also a principal investigator for the CLISAP Excellence Cluster at Universität Hamburg and served on the board of directors of the German Marine Science Consortium (KDM). His professional roles extend to coordinating BMBF collaborative research projects GENUS (Geochemistry and Ecology of the Namibian Upwelling System) and NOAH (North Sea – Assessment of Habitats). Additionally, he was an ex officio member of the Science Steering Committee of LOICZ, a member of the LOICZ-IMBER Continental Margins Working Group, and served on the external scientific advisory board of Baltic Earth.

== Research ==
Emeis has authored or co-authored peer-reviewed publications and monographs in the field of biogeosciences throughout his career. His early research demonstrated that Pleistocene and Upper Pliocene sapropel formation in the Tyrrhenian Sea was influenced by climate variability, increased productivity, and anoxic conditions, suggesting a wider occurrence than previously thought. He participated in ODP Leg 107 in the Tyrrhenian Sea, which provided insights into the evolution of passive margins and back-arc basins. This research established that the upper Sardinian margin experienced rifting and subsidence over a million years earlier than the lower margin, likely due to subduction zone migration or deep fault shear. Following this, ODP Leg 160 further mapped sapropel formation in the eastern Mediterranean, illustrating that anoxic conditions preserved organic matter and trace metals.

Emeis' work also shed light on how Arabian Sea sediments indicate stronger upwelling and higher productivity during interglaciations, with SSTs varying by over 3 °C and productivity linked to monsoon winds rather than upwelling. His Mediterranean sediment core analysis revealed temperature and salinity changes over 16,000 years, with cooling during the last glacial period and warming in the Holocene, and highlighted the Ionian Sea's role in carbon burial during sapropel S1 formation. Additionally, he discovered unusually low δ15N levels in the eastern Mediterranean, attributed to extensive mineralization, lack of denitrification, and potential anthropogenic nitrate sources. His collaborative research uncovered high coastal eutrophication in the Baltic Sea due to riverine nitrogen and lower levels centrally. Subsequent findings showed δ13C and δ15N records indicating significant eutrophication and increased plankton productivity over the last century.

== Selected articles ==
- Kastens, K., Mascle, J., Auroux, C., Bonatti, E., Broglia, C., Channell, J., ... & Torii, M. (1988). ODP Leg 107 in the Tyrrhenian Sea: Insights into passive margin and back-arc basin evolution. Geological Society of America Bulletin, 100(7), 1140–1156.
- Torres, M. E., Brumsack, H. J., Bohrmann, G., & Emeis, K. C. (1996). Barite fronts in continental margin sediments: a new look at barium remobilization in the zone of sulfate reduction and formation of heavy barites in diagenetic fronts. Chemical Geology, 127(1–3), 125–139.
- Emeis, K. C., Struck, U., Schulz, H. M., Rosenberg, R., Bernasconi, S., Erlenkeuser, H., ... & Martinez-Ruiz, F. (2000). Temperature and salinity variations of Mediterranean Sea surface waters over the last 16,000 years from records of planktonic stable oxygen isotopes and alkenone unsaturation ratios. Palaeogeography, Palaeoclimatology, Palaeoecology, 158(3–4), 259–280.
- Kudrass, H. R., Hofmann, A., Doose, H., Emeis, K., & Erlenkeuser, H. (2001). Modulation and amplification of climatic changes in the Northern Hemisphere by the Indian summer monsoon during the past 80 ky. Geology, 29(1), 63–66.
- Zonneveld, K. A., Versteegh, G. J., Kasten, S., Eglinton, T. I., Emeis, K. C., Huguet, C., ... & Wakeham, S. G. (2010). Selective preservation of organic matter in marine environments; processes and impact on the sedimentary record. Biogeosciences, 7(2), 483–511.
