= Setembrino Petri =

Brazilian naturalist, geologist, and professor

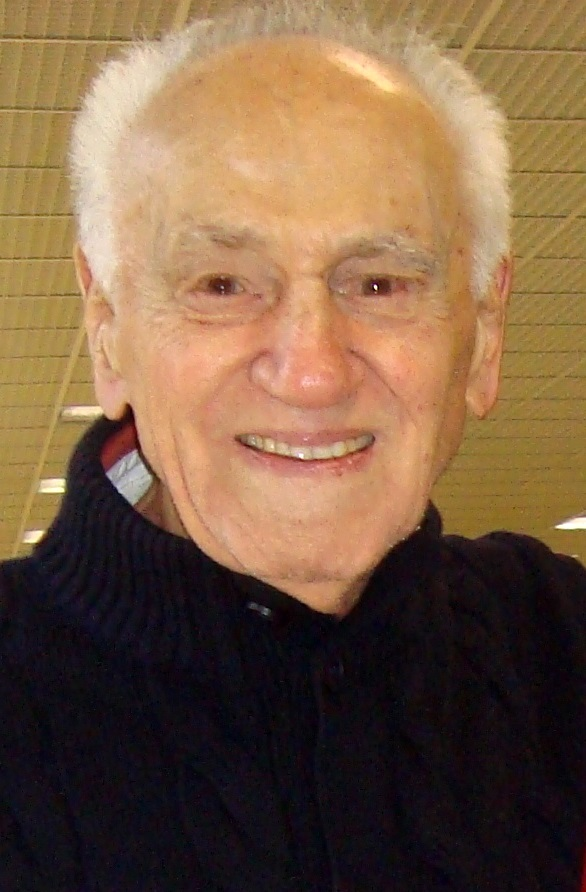
Image of Setembrino

Setembrino Petri (September 25, 1922 – March 1, 2023) was a Brazilian naturalist, geologist, researcher, and university professor. He was a member of the Brazilian Academy of Sciences. He was a Commander of the Ordem Nacional do Mérito Científico.
