= Petrology =

Study of rocks in geology

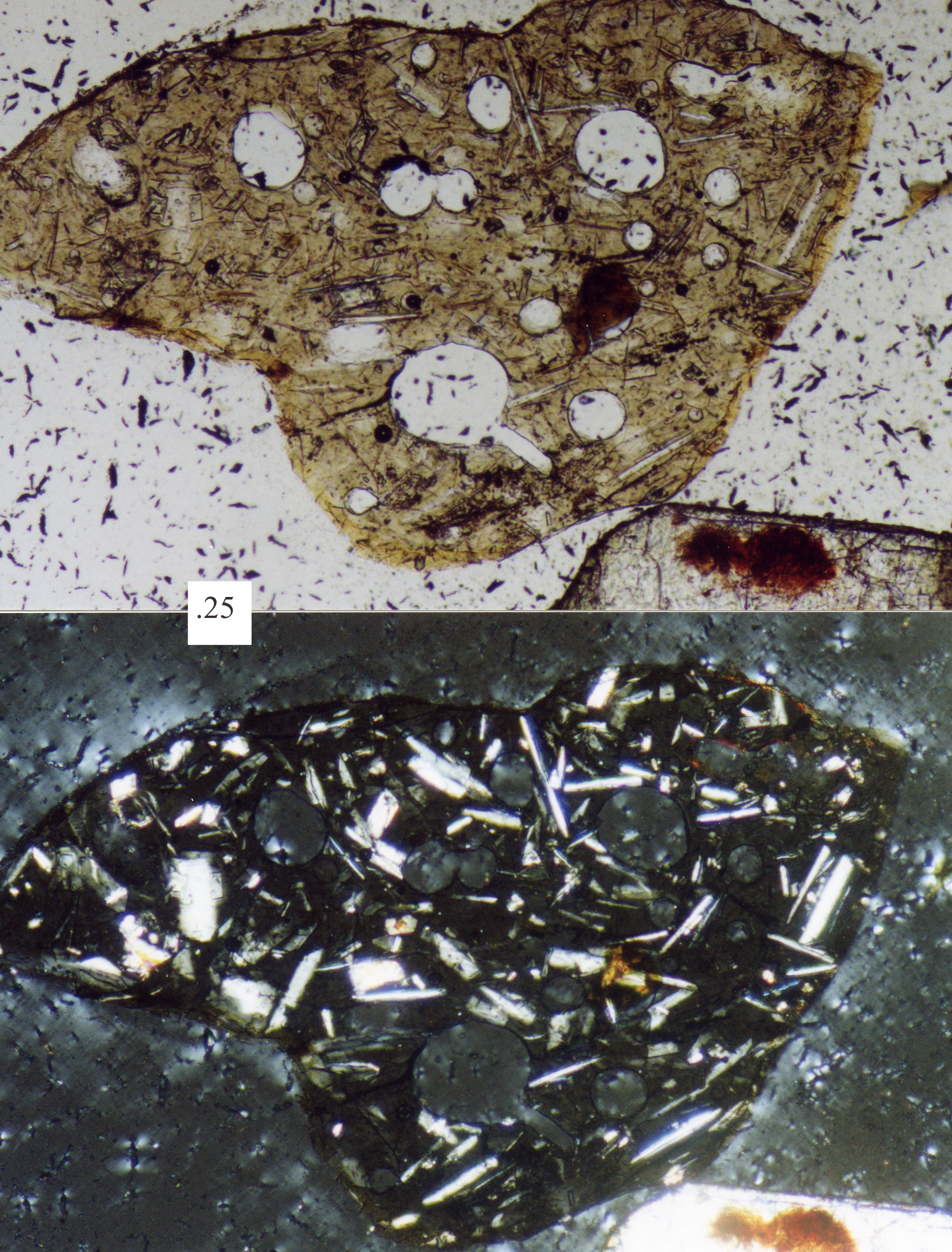
A thin section of a volcanic sand grain seen under the microscope, with plane-polarized light in the upper picture, and cross-polarized light in the lower picture. Scale box is 0.25 mm.

Petrology (from Ancient Greek πέτρος (pétros) 'rock' and -λογία (-logía) 'study of') is the branch of geology that studies rocks, their mineralogy, composition, texture, structure and the conditions under which they form. Petrology has three subdivisions: igneous, metamorphic, and sedimentary petrology. Igneous and metamorphic petrology are commonly taught together because both make heavy use of chemistry, chemical methods, and phase diagrams. Sedimentary petrology is commonly taught together with stratigraphy because it deals with the processes that form sedimentary rock. Modern sedimentary petrology is making increasing use of chemistry.

== Background ==
Lithology was once approximately synonymous with petrography, but in current usage, lithology focuses on macroscopic hand-sample or outcrop-scale description of rocks while petrography is the speciality that deals with microscopic details.

In the petroleum industry, lithology, or more specifically mud logging, is the graphic representation of geological formations being drilled through and drawn on a log called a mud log. As the cuttings are circulated out of the borehole, they are sampled, examined (typically under a 10× microscope) and tested chemically when needed.

== Methodology ==
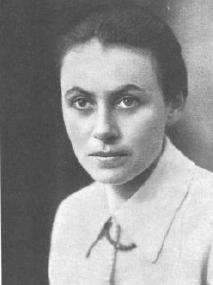
Ljudmila Dolar Mantuani (1906–1988), first female professor of petrography in Yugoslavia

Petrology utilizes the fields of mineralogy, petrography, optical mineralogy, and chemical analysis to describe the composition and texture of rocks. Petrologists also include the principles of geochemistry and geophysics through the study of geochemical trends and cycles and the use of thermodynamic data and experiments in order to better understand the origins of rocks.

== Branches ==
There are three branches of petrology, corresponding to the three types of rocks: igneous, metamorphic, and sedimentary, and another dealing with experimental techniques:

- Igneous petrology focuses on the composition and texture of igneous rocks (rocks such as granite or basalt which have crystallized from molten rock or magma). Igneous rocks include volcanic and plutonic rocks.
- Sedimentary petrology focuses on the composition and texture of sedimentary rocks (rocks such as sandstone, shale, or limestone which consist of pieces or particles derived from other rocks or biological or chemical deposits, and are usually bound together in a matrix of finer material).
- Metamorphic petrology focuses on the composition and texture of metamorphic rocks (rocks such as slate, marble, gneiss, or schist) which have undergone chemical, mineralogical or textural changes due to the effects of pressure, temperature, or both). The original rock, prior to change (called the protolith), may be of any sort.
- Experimental petrology employs high-pressure, high-temperature apparatus to investigate the geochemistry and phase relations of natural or synthetic materials at elevated pressures and temperatures. Experiments are particularly useful for investigating rocks of the lower crust and upper mantle that rarely survive the journey to the surface in pristine condition. They are also one of the prime sources of information about completely inaccessible rocks, such as those in the Earth's lower mantle and in the mantles of the other terrestrial planets and the Moon. The work of experimental petrologists has laid a foundation on which modern understanding of igneous and metamorphic processes has been built.

== See also ==
- Ore
- Pedology
