= Ljudmila Dolar Mantuani =

Slovenian petrologist

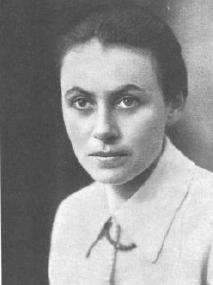
- Dolar Mantuani
- Born: 5 July 1906; Celje, Styria, Austria-Hungary
- Died: 22 September 1988 (aged 82); Toronto, Ontario, Canada
- Other name: Ludmila Dolar-Mantuani
- Occupation: Geologist

Ljudmila Dolar Mantuani (5 July 1906 Celje, Slovenia – 22 September 1988 Toronto, Canada) was a Slovenian petrologist (a rock scientist). She was the first female assistant professor of petrography in Yugoslavia.

== Life and work ==
Dolar Mantuani graduated from the University of Ljubljana in Slovenia in 1929 and received her doctorate there in 1935. After graduation, she taught at a grammar school. In 1940, she was named assistant professor of petrography and optical exploration of minerals and rocks at the University of Ljubljana.

According to Mojca Smolej in 2019, a professor at the same university, "As early as 1940, this faculty got the first female assistant professor of petrography in the Kingdom of Yugoslavia: Ljudmila Dolar-Mantuani, whose unfortunate fate after the war forced her to live in exile in the US, where she built many dams."

Dolar Mantuani furthered her studies at the universities of Zagreb, Croatia, Rome, Italy, Vancouver, Canada and Essen, Germany. She later became a research fellow at the University of British Columbia in Vancouver and a scientific adviser at the Hydroelectric Power Commission of Ontario in Toronto.

After 1971, she worked as an independent researcher for several Canadian private and government institutions.

In papers that Dr. Dolar Mantuani authored after her move to North America, she is published with a slight change to the spelling of her name from Ljudmila to Ludmila Dolar-Mantuani (with hyphen added).

=== Early research ===
Dolar Mantuani published an estimated 70 discussions and articles on mineralogy and petrology of Slovenia, Austria and Canada. Important to her early work were her explorations of the depths of Pohorje and tertiary tuffs at Peračica in the Upper Carniola region in Slovenia.

=== Concrete research ===
After moving to North America, Dolar-Mantuani was widely published in the area of concrete technology and the factors pertaining to the quality of the aggregate (stones and other materials used when mixing the concrete that can have physical or chemical characteristics that might harm the quality of the finished product). In one of her papers, she discussed the significance of five quality tests of potential aggregate (paraphrased below).

One is a test for soundness (the ASTM Test for Soundness of Aggregates by Use of Sodium Sulfate or Magnesium Sulfate) to determine the overall quality of the aggregate. The other four tests can help determine the presence of harmful particles or substances that might influence the fresh concrete when it is mixed or in its early stage of hardening. These harmful substances might also damage the concrete surface under specific circumstances.

== Selected publications ==
- Dolar Mantuani, Ljudmila. Das Verhältnis des Aplite zu den Tonaliten im Massiv des Pohorje (bachergebirges). Slovenia, L. Dolar-Mantuani, 1934.
- Dolar-Mantuani, Ludmila. Petrography and Utilization of Paleozoic, Middle Ordovician Carbonate Rocks in Southern Ontario. Canada, Ministry of Natural Resources, 1975.
- Dolar-Mantuani, Ludmila. Handbook of concrete aggregates: a petrographic and technological evaluation. United States, Noyes Publications, 1983.
