= Fernando Flávio Marques de Almeida =

Brazilian geologist

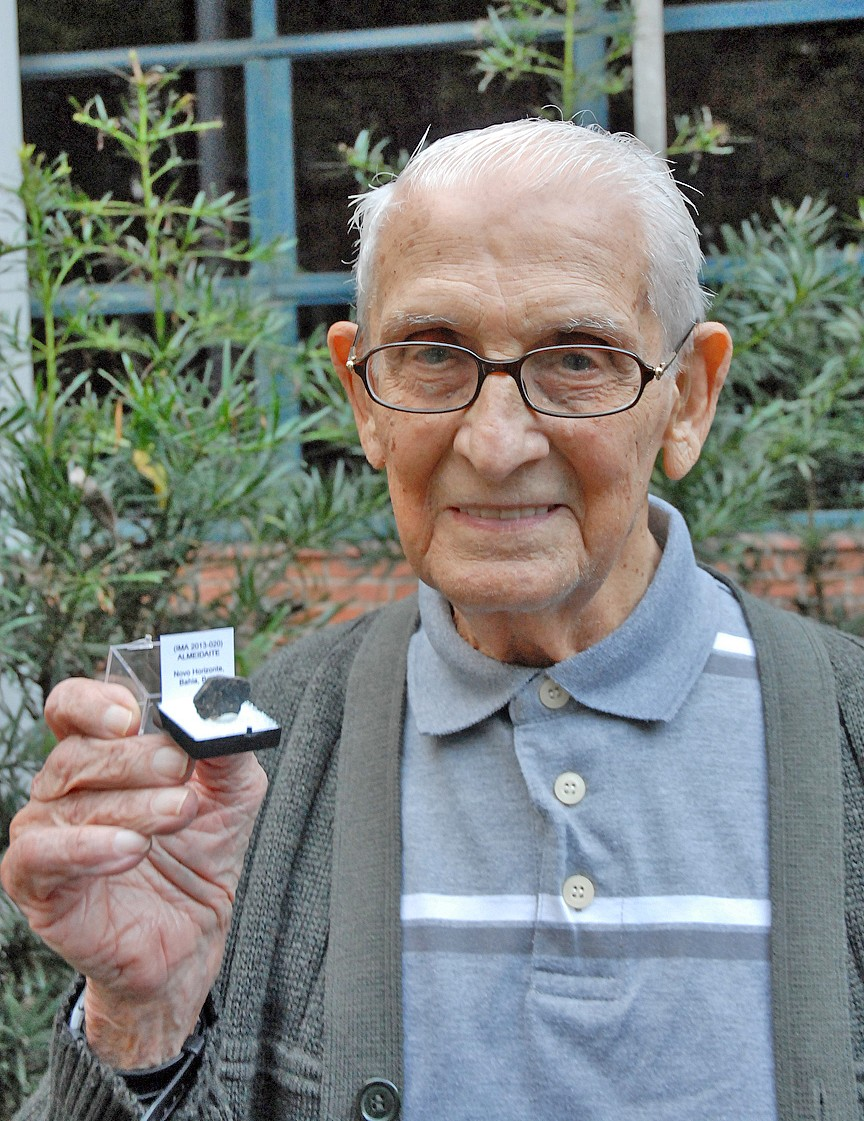
- Born: February 18, 1916; Rio de Janeiro, Brazil
- Died: August 2, 2013 (aged 97); São Paulo, Brazil
- Occupation: Geologist
- Known for: Geology

Fernando Flávio Marques de Almeida (February 18, 1916 – August 2, 2013) was a Brazilian geologist considered to be one of the top Brazilians concerned with the study. Almeida did the central works to understand the South American geology. He is the son of the first Brazilian generation of geologists who did the pioneering papers of the continent's geology. Marques de Almeida is a member of the Brazilian Academy of Sciences.

Born in Rio de Janeiro in 1916, his parents were the lawyer Gerson de Almeida and Nair Marques de Almeida. He did his primary and secondary studies at the Gymnasium of São Bento in São Paulo state in which he spent most of his life. Finished junior high school did tender for the Polytechnic School of São Paulo, where he graduated in Civil Engineering in 1938. Had much influence on his future career Professor Dr. Luiz Flores de Moraes Rego, Professor of Mineralogy, Petrography and geology of this school. To finish the school year in which he attended a Chair, Professor Moraes Rego invited him to join as a student-assistant at the Institute for Technological Research. When graduating from became Assistant Professor Moraes Rego, prematurely deceased.

Remained at the Polytechnic School for 35 years, having made tender for Free-Teaching in 1957, with a thesis on the Geology and Petrology of the Archipelago of Fernando de Noronha, the Chair ruled when the professor Dr. Octavio Barbosa. With this dismissal, took the chair, which made for tender in 1962, with a thesis on the Trindade Island. Until 1969 been in part-time, which allowed him to join the National Department of Mineral Production for the contest in which he made 1956, having been dismissed in 1969 to take a full-time integral to teaching and research (RDIDP). He retired in 1994. In 1974 he was hired by the Institute of Geosciences, University of São Paulo, under RDIDP.

In 1978 he left the University and joined the Technological Research Institute of São Paulo, from where ends walking away. He graduated from this institute between 1985 and 1990, which appointed by the Institute of Geosciences, State University of Campinas. During such a long life traveled almost all over the country, having published 176 scientific papers and book chapters in Brazil and abroad, dealing with various topics of Geosciences. It was one of the founders of the Brazilian Society of Geology and the first chief editor of the Journal of Geology. Held various positions scientific-technical and administrative and participated numerous conferences and other scientific national and international meetings.

Among the awards received are: Biography in Who's Who in the World of Marquis Who's Who Inc., Chicago (1971-1972), Vice-President of Géologique Société de France (1971); Medal Jose Bonifacio - Society Brazilian Geology (1964), Grand Cross of the National Order of Merit Scientific - President of the Republic of Brazil (1995), Doctor Honoris Causa State University of Campinas (1991), Medal of Merit Council Federal Engineering and Architecture (1995).

== Awards ==
- Medal of the Patriarch – Mayor of Santos – 1961
- Medalha José Bonifácio – Sociedade Brasileira de Geologia – 1964
- Medal Jose Bonifacio – Brazilian Society of Geology – 1964
- Medalha do Mérito – Conselho Federal de Engenharia, Arquitetura e Agronomia – 1994
- Medal of Merit – Federal Council of Engineering, Architecture and Agronomy – 1994

== Honours ==
- Mineral Order of Merit – National Department of Mineral Production – 1984
- Doutor honoris causa – Universidade Estadual de Campinas – 1991 Doctor honoris causa – University of Alberta – 1991
- Título de Cidadão Mato-grossense - Assembléia Legislativa do Estado da Guanabara – 1996
- Evidence of Citizen-Mato Grosso – Legislative Assembly of the state of Guanabara – 1996

== See also ==
- Aziz Ab'Saber, another Brazilian important geologist
