= Petroleum geologist =

Earth scientist who works in geological aspects of oil discovery and production

A petroleum geologist is an earth scientist who works in the field of petroleum geology, which involves all aspects of the discovery and production of oil and gas. Petroleum geologists are usually linked to the actual discovery of oil and gas and the identification of possible new oil deposits or gas fields. It can be a very labor-intensive task involving several different fields of science and elaborate equipment. Petroleum geologists look at the structural and sedimentary aspects of the stratum/strata to identify possible oil traps or tight shale plays.

== Profile ==
Petroleum geologists make the decision of where to drill for petroleum. This is done by locating prospects within a sedimentary basin. Petroleum geologists determine a prospect's viability looking at seven main aspects in conventional petroleum geology:

- Source: the presence of an organic-rich source rock capable of generating hydrocarbons during deep burial.
- Reservoir: the usually porous rock and permeable unit that collects the hydrocarbons expelled from the source rock and holds them inside a trap.
- Seal: the rock unit that inhibits the oil or gas from escaping from a hydrocarbon-bearing reservoir rock.
- Trap: structural or stratigraphic feature that captures migrating hydrocarbons into an economically producible accumulation.
- Timing: geologic events must occur in a certain order, e.g. that the trap formed before migration rather than after.
- Maturation: the process of alteration of a source rock under heat and pressure, leading to the cracking of its organic matter into oil and gas.
- Migration: the movement of the (less dense) oil or gas from the source rock into a reservoir rock and then into a trap.

These seven key aspects require the petroleum geologist to obtain a 4-dimensional idea of the subsurface (the three spatial dimensions, plus time). Data may be obtained via geophysical methods. Geophysical surveys show the seismology data of elastic waves, mainly seismic reflection. This provides a 3-dimensional look of the trap, and source rock. More data may be obtained from the mudlogger, who analyzes the drill cuttings and the rock formation thicknesses.

Today, there are also unconventional tight plays. Petroleum geologists for these plays work with petroleum engineers and other specialists to make decisions of where to drill for oil. Data is also obtained via geophysical methods (the same as conventional plays, plus fracture data), but these are modernly analyzed with various statistical methods. The geological analysis is done by looking at a combination of geological aspects, with completion analogs. The geological aspects are as follows:

- Source: the presence of an organic-rich source rock. Unlike conventional plays, where the source rock typically underlays the reservoir rock and the oil/gas migrates into the reservoir, tight shale plays can be their own source rock.
- Reservoir: the usually porous rock with lower permeability rock. This rock could have collected hydrocarbons expelled from a source rock, or be its own source rock.
- Seal: often, due to the low permeability, oil/gas is unable to migrate out of this rock, but it is common to also have a sealing rock above the reservoir rock that inhibits further migration of oil or gas.
- Timing: geologic events must occur in a certain order, e.g. a seal to trap gas must be in place before kerogen cracking.
- Maturation: the process of alteration of a source rock under head and pressure, leading to the cracking of its organic matter into oil and gas.
- Migration: the movement of the (less dense) oil or gas from the source rock into a reservoir rock and then into a trap.

The 'trap' aspect is absent. Tight shale plays, or unconventional plays, do not require a trap to contain hydrocarbons due to the low permeability preventing further migration.

== See also ==
- Petroleum industry
