= Morley E. Wilson =

Canadian geologist

Morley Evans Wilson FRSC
- Born: 1881
- Died: October 27, 1965
- Education: University of Toronto (BA, 1907); Yale University (PhD, 1912)
- Awards: Fellow of the Royal Society of Canada (1924); Willet G. Miller Medal (1945); Penrose Medal (1950)
- Scientific career
- Fields: Economic geology
- Workplaces: Geological Survey of Canada
- Thesis: Preliminary memoir on the Abitibi district, Pontiac County, Quebec. (1912)

Morley Evans Wilson (1881–1965) was a Canadian geologist. He was awarded the Penrose Medal of the Geological Society of America in 1950.

== Biography and career ==
Wilson was born in Canada in 1881. He completed his B.A. degree at the University of Toronto in 1907, and a PhD at Yale University in 1912. At Yale, his geological advisors included Joseph Barrell, Isaiah Bowman, Louis V. Pirsson and John Duer Irving. His doctoral thesis was a preliminary geological study of the Abitibi district of Pontiac County, Quebec, which he published in 1913 as a memoir of the Canadian geological survey and department of mines.

Wilson was a temporary employee of the Canadian geological survey from 1904 to 1907, while he was an undergraduate, and was a permanent employee from 1907 to 1947. He was a field geologist, and conducted extensive field mapping and research into the stratigraphy and economic geology of the Precambrian rocks of the Canadian shield in the Noranda district and in the Madoc district. He published geological maps, and monographs on mineral resources. In 1939, he published the first map to subdivide the provinces of the Canadian shield.

From 1929 to 1931, Wilson acted as an examiner in geology and mineralogy, for Alfred Fitzpatrick's extramural degree programme, Frontier College.

Director of the Geological Survey of Canada, James Harrison later recalled that Wilson was a "small, spare, sparrow-like man whose religion, vocation, and hobby was geology". After his retirement from the survey, Wilson was a special lecturer at Carleton University; he also took up curling.

== Selected publications ==
- Wilson, M. E. (1910). Geology of an area adjoining the east side of Lake Timiskaming, Quebec. Canada Department of Mines, Geological Survey Branch. Ottawa: Government Printing Bureau – via Canadiana.ca.
- Wilson, Morley Evans (1926). Talc Deposits of Canada. Canada Department of Mines, Geological Survey. Economic Geology Series. no. 2. Ottawa: Government Printing Bureau.
- Wilson, Morley Evans (1929). Fluorspar Deposits of Canada. Canada Department of Mines, Geological Survey. Economic Geology Series no. 6. Ottawa: Government Printing Bureau.
- Wilson, M.E. (1939). "The Canadian Shield". In Ruedemann, R; Balk, R (eds.). Geologie der Erde: Geology of North America. Vol. 1. Berlin: Verlag von Gebrüder Borntraeger. pp. 232–311.

== Recognition ==
In 1924, Wilson was elected a Fellow of the Royal Society of Canada. He was awarded the Willet G. Miller Medal of the Royal Society of Canada in 1945, and in 1950 was awarded the premier medal of the Geological Society of America, the Penrose medal. Wilson was the first member of the Canadian geological survey to receive this award.

== Later life ==
For much of his life, Wilson lived in Ottawa. After his first wife died, Wilson married Lilian Agnes Salt in November 1949. Wilson died in Ottawa, Canada on 27 October 1965.
