= HUTV =

HUTV can stand for:

- Health Unlimited Television network, HUTV, Place Based Digital Out of Home network of TV screens deployed in medical waiting areas throughout the province of Alberta Canada.
- Harvard Undergraduate Television (HUTV), the Harvard College student-run Internet television network.
- HUTV, the closed circuit television station of Hollins University.
