= W. W. Hutchison Medal =

Geological sciences award

W. W. Hutchison Medal

The W.W. Hutchison Medal is a scientific award given by the Geological Association of Canada and named after William W. Hutchison in recognition of his many contributions to the Association and to Canadian and international geoscience. The medal is awarded to a young individual for recent exceptional advances in Canadian earth science research. Prior to 2004 the award was called the Past-Presidents' Medal.

== Recipients ==
- 1974 – Paul F. Hoffman
- 1975 – Roger G. Walker
- 1976 – Harold Williams
- 1977 – Christopher R. Barnes
- 1978 – Christopher Brooks
- 1979 – Charlotte E. Keen
- 1980 – David F. Strong
- 1981 – Dirk J. Templeman Kluit
- 1982 – Noel P. James
- 1983 – [Andrew. D. Miall
- 1984 – Rolf Ludvigsen
- 1985 – Derek York
- 1986 – Brian J. Fryer
- 1987 – Jan Veizer
- 1988 – Ronald M. Clowes
- 1989 – John Malpas
- 1990 – Uwe Bran
- 1991 – Frank C. Hawthorne
- 1992 – Euan G. Nisbet
- 1993 – Fred J. Longstaffe
- 1994 – S. George Pemberton
- 1995 – Michael J. Whiticar
- 1996 – T. Kurt Kyser
- 1997 – John P. Smol
- 1998 – Robert A. Creaser
- 1999 – Cees R. van Staal
- 2000 – Gerald M. Ross
- 2001 – Alfonso Mucci
- 2002 – Brian R. Pratt
- 2003 – Michael Melchin
- 2004 – Shoufa Lin
- 2005 – Alan J. Anderson
- 2006 – John Gosse
- 2007 – Jeremy Richards
- 2008 – James MacEachern
- 2009 – Michael Caldwell
- 2010 – Octavian Catuneanu
- 2011 – Anton Chakhmouradian
- 2012 – Galen Halverson
- 2013 – Duane Froese
- 2014 – Ali Polat
- 2015 – Murray Gingras
- 2016 – Stephen J. Piercey
- 2017 – Christie D. Rowe
- 2018 – Gordon Osinski
- 2019 – Brian Kendall
- 2020 – Shahin Dashtgard
- 2021 – Vincent van Hinsberg
- 2022 – Britta Jensen
- 2023 – Jamie Kirkpatrick
- 2024 – Christopher J. Spencer

Source: GAC

== See also ==
- List of geology awards
