= HRTV =

HRTV may refer to:

- Harvard-Radcliffe Television (now Harvard Undergraduate Television), a Harvard University student-run television organization
- The Heartland virus, a virus under the Bhanja virus serocomplex, under Phlebovirus
- High-definition television (HDTV), via the incorrect nomenclature "high-resolution television"
- Horse Racing TV, a television network dedicated to horse sports
