= John Malpas =

John Graham Malpas
- Born: January 9, 1948 (age 78); London, England
- Citizenship: British, Canadian
- Education: Wadham College, Oxford, University of Oxford, Memorial University of Newfoundland
- Known for: Research on ophiolites and oceanic lithosphere; Founding The University of Hong Kong's Department of Earth Sciences
- Awards: W. W. Hutchison Medal (1989), Michael J. Keen Medal (1995), Gesner Medal (1997)
- Scientific career
- Fields: Geology, Igneous petrology, Geochemistry
- Workplaces: The University of Hong Kong, Memorial University of Newfoundland

John Graham Malpas (born 9 January 1948) is a British-Canadian geologist and academic administrator. He is Professor Emeritus at The University of Hong Kong (HKU), where he was the founding Chair Professor of the Department of Earth Sciences and later served as Pro-Vice-Chancellor.

== Early life and education ==
Malpas was born on 9 January 1948 in London, England. He was educated at the Roan School, Greenwich and then at Wadham College, University of Oxford on an RAF scholarship.

He earned his Bachelor of Arts (BA Oxon) in 1969 and Master of Arts (MA Oxon) in 1971. He moved to Canada for graduate studies at Memorial University of Newfoundland (MUN), completing an MSc (1971) and a PhD in Geology (1975). He was later awarded a Doctor of Science (DSc) degree from Oxford University (2002) for his original contributions to the field of earth sciences.

== Academic career ==
=== Memorial University of Newfoundland ===
Malpas spent over 25 years at Memorial University, rising to the rank of Professor of Geology. During his tenure, he served as Head of the Department of Earth Sciences and the university's Dean of Graduate Studies.

=== The University of Hong Kong ===
In 1995, Malpas joined The University of Hong Kong to establish the territory's first academic Department of Earth Sciences. He served as the founding Head of Department and as Associate Dean of the Graduate School, before transitioning into senior university administration. He also served on the University Grants Committee (UGC) of the HKSAR from 2007 to 2013.

His administrative roles included:

- Pro-Vice-Chancellor and Vice-President (2000–2013): Responsible for infrastructure, planning, and resources. He led a significant reform of Human Resources policy, developed university strategic plans, and led the development of the HKU Centennial Campus.
- Centennial College: He served as the inaugural President of Centennial College, a private degree-granting institution established by The University of Hong Kong.

== Research and contributions ==
Malpas is an expert in igneous petrology and the study of ophiolites. His work on the Bay of Islands ophiolite in Newfoundland was one of the first to demonstrate that such formations represent pieces of ancient oceanic lithosphere. He has published extensively on the Semail Ophiolite of Oman, the Troodos Ophiolite of Cyprus, and Tibetan ophiolites.

He has held leadership positions in the international Ocean Drilling Program (ODP) and served as the Secretary/Treasurer (1981–1988) and later as President (1991) of the Geological Association of Canada (GAC).

== Awards and honors ==
- W. W. Hutchison Medal (1989): Awarded by GAC for outstanding contributions to geoscience.
- Michael J. Keen Medal (1995): Awarded by GAC for outstanding contributions to marine geoscience.
- Gesner Medal (1997): Awarded by the Atlantic Geoscience Society.
- Workman-Malpas Medal: Joint namesake of this medal, awarded by the Geological Society of London (Hong Kong Regional Group) and the Geological Society of Hong Kong.
- Honorary Doctor of the Academy (2013): Awarded by the Hong Kong Academy for Performing Arts (HKAPA).

== Personal life ==
In his youth, Malpas was a member of the United Kingdom National Basketball Team. He also has a love of music, having played the trumpet, French horn, and flute.
