= Clifford H. Stockwell =

Canadian geologist

Clifford Howard Stockwell
- Born: September 26, 1897; Estevan, Saskatchewan
- Died: April 26, 1987 (aged 89); Ottawa, Ontario
- Scientific career
- Fields: Geology

Clifford Howard Stockwell (September 26, 1897 – April 26, 1987) was a Canadian geologist, who published many scientific papers, reports and memoirs in the fields of Mineralogy, Structural Geology, Petrology, and Stratigraphy. He earned his PhD in geology at McGill University in Montreal in 1926.

== Biography ==
He completed his earliest publication, "Galena Hill, Mayo District, Yukon", in 1925 as a graduate student. In 1927, Stockwell's paper on "The X-ray Study of the Garnet Group", earned him recognition, as it was an important step in the understanding of the crystal structure of these minerals. In 1933, he received acclaim for his work on "The Genesis of Pegmatites of Southwest Manitoba". Some of his other noteworthy papers include; "The Chromite Deposits of the Eastern Townships, Quebec," "The Gold Deposits of Herb Lake Area", and "The Rice Lake-Gold Lake Area", in Manitoba.

Dr. Stockwell was also an explorer. In July/August 1932, he canoed through the unexplored region north of Great Slave Lake. This work delineated the basic features and problems of the geology of this large part of the Precambrian Shield, and laid the foundation for the many studies that followed.

He devoted much of his time working for the Geological Survey of Canada.

In the 1950s he concentrated on Structural Geology- the structural controls of mineral deposits.

During World War 1, he trained to be a pilot with the Royal Flying Corps but by the time he qualified as a pilot, hostilities were over.

He was married to A. Elizabeth Johnston (1909–1964), a talented amateur oil painter. He is buried with his wife in Pinecrest Cemetery, Ottawa.

== Awards ==
- 1944, awarded the Barlow Memorial Medal by the Canadian Institute of Mining, Metallurgy and Petroleum for his paper titled Chromite Deposits of the Eastern Townships, Quebec
- 1953, awarded the Willet G. Miller Medal by the Royal Society of Canada
- 1973, awarded the Logan Medal by the Geological Association of Canada
