= MacKay Medical University =

Medical University in New Taipei, Taiwan

Coordinates: 25°15′15.7″N 121°29′42.3″E

MacKay Medical University 馬偕醫學大學
- Motto: 敬天愛人 謙忍卓決
- Type: Private
- Established: 2009
- Religious affiliation: Presbyterian Church in Taiwan
- President: Wei Yau-Huei (魏耀揮)
- Provost: Cho Wen-Lung (卓文隆)
- chairman: Lin Yi-Min (林逸民)
- Academic staff: 62 (full time) (2013); 148 (joint) (2013)
- Students: 428
- Undergraduates: 419
- Postgraduates: 9
- Location: No.46, Sec. 3, Zhongzheng Rd., Sanzhi, New Taipei, Taiwan
- Website: MMC (in Chinese)

MacKay Medical University
- Traditional Chinese: 馬偕醫學大學
Transcriptions
Standard Mandarin
- Hanyu Pinyin: Mǎjiē Yīxué Dàxué
Southern Min
- Hokkien POJ: Má-kai I-ha̍k Tāi-ha̍k

The MacKay Medical University (MMU; Chinese: 馬偕醫學大學; Pe̍h-ōe-jī: Má-kai I-ha̍k Tāi-ha̍k), formerly the Mackay Medical College, is a medical University located in Sanzhi District, New Taipei, Taiwan. Through the approval of the Ministry of Education, it became Taiwan's 12th medical school on March 30, 2009.

MacKay Medical University offers undergraduate and graduate programs in medicine, nursing, and medical technology.

The university has established partnerships with several universities and medical institutions around the world, including the University of California, Los Angeles (UCLA) in the United States, the University of Melbourne in Australia, and the University of Liverpool in the United Kingdom.

== Overview ==
Establishing MacKay Medical University is to commemorate George Leslie Mackay, who is the first Presbyterian missionary to Taiwan, as well as training of medical personnel. And the anniversary is March 21, which is George Leslie Mackay's birthday. Parts of the medical curriculum in Mackay adopt strategic alliance with National Yang-Ming University, and general education courses are admitted by "Summer School" which held by Second Northern Taiwan Teaching Resource Center.

== History ==
=== Chronicle of Events ===
- 1995/10 Set up medical college preparatory group
- 1997/03 Filing applications to the Ministry of Education
- 1999/03 Set up the preparatory office which located in Mackay Memorial Hospital Tamsui branch.
- 1999/05 Invite Professor Gao Mingxian (高明憲) as director of the Preparatory Office.
- 2000/01 Submitted a detailed proposal of college to The Ministry of Education.
- 2003/03 Regional Planning Commission of the Ministry of Interior through the campus development plan.
- 2005/02 The Ministry of Education through the school's establishment license.
- 2006/12 Registered the Foundation.
- 2007/07 Obtained a construction permit.
- 2008/04 The first phase of campus started constructed.
- 2008/05 Invite Professor Fang Juxiong (方菊雄) as director of the Preparatory Office.
- 2008/09/20 Thanksgiving worship of the beaming.
- 2009/01 The 2nd board of directors elected Mr. Huang Junxiong as the chairman.
- 2009/02 Ministry of Education through the school's filing applications.
- 2009/03 The Ministry of Education granted its filing and enrollment (台高(四)字第0980050130號)
- 2009/04 The Ministry of Education approved the appointment of Wei, Yau-Huei as the founding president of Mackay Medical College.
- 2009/04 18 Thanksgiving Ceremony of the first phase of campus completion.
- 2009/07 The 1st students were enrolled.
- 2009/09 12 The Opening Ceremony and the inauguration of president of Mackay Medical college.
- 2010/03 20 The first anniversary, scheduled for the day before Mackay's birthday.
- 2011/10 Notified that the preparation for Institute of Biomedical Sciences is granted by the Ministry of Education.
- 2012/09 The first graduate students were enrolled. Set up the Department of Audiology and Speech Language pathology.
- 2013/03/23 The 2nd phase of campus completion.
- 2013/06/15 Held the 1st graduation ceremony of Department of Nursing.

=== President ===
- 2009 President Wei, Yau-Huei (魏耀揮)
- 2013 President Wei, Yau-Huei (魏耀揮)

=== Chairman ===
- 2009 Chairman Huang Junxiong (黃俊雄)
- 2013 Chairman Lin Yimin (林逸民)

== See also ==
- List of universities in Taiwan
