= James E. Gill =

Canadian scientist, teacher, explorer and mine developer

Dr. James E. Gill
- Born: 1901; Nelson, British Columbia
- Died: January 26, 1980 (aged 78–79); Canada
- Citizenship: Canadian
- Education: McGill University; Princeton University
- Known for: Stratigraphy and Pleistocene geology
- Awards: Barlow Memorial Medal; Leonard Medal; Willet G. Miller Medal; Logan Medal (1967)
- Scientific career
- Fields: Geology; Exploration
- Workplaces: University of Rochester; McGill University

Notes
- Discovered high-grade iron ore deposits in Quebec and Labrador

James Edward Gill (1901 – January 26, 1980) was a scientist, teacher, explorer and mine developer. Along with William R. James, Sr. he discovered the high-grade iron ore deposits of Quebec and Labrador. He is remembered for his important contributions in the fields of stratigraphy and Pleistocene geology.

Gill was born in Nelson, British Columbia. He started off attending the University of British Columbia, but completed his B.Sc. in Mining Engineering in 1921 at McGill University. He worked as a Mining Engineer for two years in British Columbia, before going on to Princeton University as a Proctor Fellow. In 1925, he obtained his PhD.

== Career ==
Gill began at the University of Rochester as Assistant Professor in 1925. After three years he moved to Montreal to teach at McGill. While at McGill he introduced the Master's of Applied Science in Mineral Exploration program and established an analytical laboratory for the application of geochemistry to mineral exploration.

Gill focused his studies on the structural geology of ore deposits. He formulated the concept of a "structural province" and used it to define the fundamental subdivisions of the Canadian Shield. He then published over 50 technical papers. He served as Managing Editor for the 24th International Geological Congress.

Outside of academia, Gill discovered deposits, which became mines and expansions of producing mines. In 1929, Gill and Dr. William R. James Sr., an internationally famous mining consultant, conducted one of the first major air-supported exploration projects. It resulted in the discovery of the high-grade iron ore deposits that led to the opening up of the iron wealth of Quebec and Labrador. Gill was instrumental in discovery of more than three gold mines in northwestern Quebec and served as consultant and advisor on several other successful gold mines. His field work identified coal on Vancouver Island, fire clays in Pennsylvania, the Caribbean, South America, the mineral resources of the Northwest Territories and Red Lake, Ontario.

During World War II Gill directed the development and opening of Canada's only chromite mine.

In 1949, Gill was a founding member of the executive committee of the National Advisory Committee on Research in the Geological Sciences. Gill retired from McGill in 1969 as Emeritus Professor.

== Honours ==
- 1939, awarded the Barlow Memorial Medal by the Canadian Institute of Mining, Metallurgy and Petroleum
- 1943, awarded the Leonard Medal of the Engineering Institute of Canada
- 1957, awarded the Willet G. Miller Medal by the Royal Society of Canada
- 1967, awarded the Logan Medal by the Geological Association of Canada]
- 2003, inducted into the Canadian Mining Hall of Fame by the Canadian Institute of Mining, Metallurgy and Petroleum
