= Journal of Paleontology =

- Discipline: Paleontology
- Language: English
- Edited by: Brian R. Pratt and Steve Hageman

Publication details
- History: 1927–present
- Publisher: Cambridge University Press Paleontological Society (United States)
- Frequency: Bimonthly
- Open access: Hybrid
- Impact factor: 1.4 (2022)

Standard abbreviations
- ISO 4: J. Paleontol.

Indexing
- ISSN: 0022-3360 (print); 1937-2337 (web)
- JSTOR: 00223360
- OCLC no.: 1754714

Links
- Journal homepage

The Journal of Paleontology is a peer-reviewed scientific journal covering the field of paleontology. It is managed and published by Cambridge University Press on behalf of the Paleontological Society.

== Indexing ==
The Journal of Paleontology is indexed in:

- BIOSIS Previews
- Science Citation Index
- The Zoological Record
- GeoRef
