= John Gosse =

Canadian geomorphologist

John C. Gosse of Dalhousie University in Halifax, Nova Scotia is a Canadian geomorphologist and leader in investigating the rate of landscape evolution via cosmogenic isotopes.

In 1989, Gosse received his bachelor's degree in geology from Memorial University of Newfoundland. In 1994, he earned his Ph.D. from Lehigh University in Pennsylvania. From 1996 to 2001, Gosse served as an assistant professor of Geology and Director of the Cosmogenic Nuclide Extraction Laboratory at the University of Kansas. In 2001, he joined the faculty of Dalhousie University as a research associate. He also worked as a scientific contractor for the Los Alamos National Laboratory in the US to help address the problem of nuclear waste disposal in the southwestern USA.

Gosse has applied the cosmogenic nuclide technique to study the glacial history of the Rocky Mountains, weathering rates and exposure histories in the Torngat Mountains of Labrador, the history of glacial retreat in Atlantic and Arctic Canada, and landscape evolution at the Grand Canyon and in Tierra del Fuego, Argentina.

Currently, Gosse holds two positions at Dalhousie University, the Canada Research Chair in Earth Systems Evolution and the Director of the only Cosmogenic Nuclide Extraction Facility in Canada.

== Awards ==
- 2003- J. Ross Mackay Award of the Canadian Geomorphological Research Group
- 2004- Petro-Canada Young Innovators Award
- 2005- Kirk Bryan Award from the Geological Society of America
- 2006- W.W. Hutchison Medal from the Geological Association of Canada
