= Willet G. Miller Medal =

Miller Medal

The Miller Medal is an award of the Royal Society of Canada given for outstanding research in any branch of the earth sciences. The award consists of a gold-plated silver medal and is awarded every two years if there is a suitable candidate.

In 1941, twelve friends of Willet Green Miller, FRSC (1867–1925), a distinguished geologist, and a guiding force in the development of the Ontario mining industry, subscribed funds to provide the Willet G. Miller Medal for geology.

== Award winners ==
Source: Royal Society of Canada

- 2022 - Donald B. Dingwell, FRSC
- 2022 - Kimberly Strong, FRSC
- 2020 - Alfonso Mucci, FRSC
- 2020 - Barbara Sherwood Lollar, FRSC
- 2018 - Ann Gargett, FRSC
- 2018 - Raymond A. Price, FRSC
- 2016 - Anne de Vernal, MRSC
- 2011 - Anthony E. Williams-Jones, FRSC
- 2009 - R. Paul Young, FRSC
- 2007 - Frederick John Longstaffe
- 2005 - Kurt Kyser, FRSC
- 2003 - Roger H. Mitchell, FRSC
- 2001 - Robert L. Carroll, FRSC
- 1999 - Robert Kerrich
- 1997 - Paul F. Hoffman
- 1995 - Hans J. Hofmann
- 1993 - Frank C. Hawthorne, FRSC
- 1991 - Jan Veizer, FRSC
- 1989 - William H. Mathews, FRSC
- 1987 - Harold Williams, FRSC
- 1985 - William S. Fyfe, FRSC
- 1983 - Donald F. Stott
- 1981 - Denis M. Shaw, FRSC
- 1979 - Edward T. Tozer
- 1977 - Allan M. Goodwin
- 1975 - J. Ross Mackay
- 1973 - Raymond Thorsteinsson
- 1971 - Robert W. Boyle
- 1969 - J.A. Jeletzky
- 1967 - Robert E. Folinsbee
- 1965 - R. J. W. Douglas, FRSC
- 1963 - Leonard G. Berry
- 1961 - William H. White
- 1959 - Loris S. Russell
- 1957 - James E. Gill
- 1955 - John Tuzo Wilson
- 1953 - Clifford H. Stockwell
- 1951 - James Edwin Hawley
- 1949 - Hardy V. Ellsworth
- 1947 - Frank H. McLearn, FRSC
- 1945 - Morley E. Wilson, FRSC
- 1943 - Norman Levi Bowen, FRSC

== See also ==
- List of geographers
- List of earth sciences awards
- List of geology awards
- List of awards named after people
