= James Edwin Hawley =

Canadian geologist

Dr. James E. Hawley
- Born: September 27, 1897; Kingston, Ontario, Canada
- Died: April 20, 1965 (aged 67); Tucson, Arizona, United States
- Education: Queen's University; University of Wisconsin–Madison
- Known for: Study of petroleum geology and ore deposits' mineralogy
- Awards: Willet G. Miller Medal; Logan Medal (1964); Barlow Memorial Prize
- Scientific career
- Fields: Geology; Mineralogy
- Workplaces: Queen's University

Notes
- Hawleyite, a mineral, is named after him.

James Edwin (Ed) Hawley (September 27, 1897 – April 20, 1965) was a Canadian geologist and distinguished professor of mineralogy at Queen's University.

== Biography ==
Hawley was raised in Kingston, Ontario, Canada. He earned both a bachelor's and a master's degree from Queen's University in 1918 and 1920, respectively. After completing his master's, Hawley spent three years working in petroleum geology in Alberta, Ecuador, Burma and India. In 1926, he earned his PhD at the University of Wisconsin–Madison. He stayed there for three years as an assistant professor.

In 1929, Hawley returned to Queen's as professor and head of the Department of Mineralogy. His earliest papers in 1929 and 1930, based on research on the generation of oil in rocks by shearing pressures, are classics in the field of petroleum geology. In 1948, he established the school's Spectrographic lab. He held that position until the Mineralogy and Geology Department were combined in 1950. At that time he was made head of the newly created, Geological Sciences Department. He held that position until 1962. Students familiar with Mohs' Hardness Scale referred to him as "Number 11" because the mineral, Hawleyite, was named after him.

He was a pioneer in the field of interpretative mineralogy; much of his research was devoted to genetic associations of ore deposits and to investigation of conditions under which metallic minerals may be transported and deposited. Through both by field investigations and by laboratory researches, Hawley made notable contributions to the mineralogy of such deposits as the nickel-copper ores of Sudbury, the iron ores of the Michipicoten district and Steep Rock Lake, the gold ores of Kirkland Lake and northern Quebec, the complex ores of the Eastern Townships, Precambrian stratigraphy, and Evidences of life in the Archaean.

The Royal Society of Canada said this about Hawley's scientific work,

"Dr. Hawley has brought to geology an incisive, scientific mind and an exceptional knowledge of the basic sciences of chemistry and physics. His work is notable for acute observation in the field and for interpretation of field phenomena on the basis of the fundamental laws of science. As a result, his contributions contain fresh and original ideas, many of which have opened up new channels of geological investigation. On the other hand, he has shown the fallacies of a number of geological hypotheses which cannot be substantiated by established laws of chemistry and physics."

Hawley was a member of the National Advisory Committee on Research in the Geological Sciences.

Hawley retired in 1963 and died two years later.

== Accolades ==
- 1951, awarded the Willet G. Miller Medal by the Royal Society of Canada
- 1955, mineral Hawleyite was named after him
- 1964, awarded the Logan Medal by the Geological Association of Canada
- 1932, awarded the Barlow Memorial Medal for his paper titled The Siscoe Gold Deposit
- The Hawley Medal is named in his honour. It is awarded by the Mineralogical Association of Canada to the authors of the best paper to appear in The Canadian Mineralogist in a given year.
- The J.E. Hawley Memorial Scholarship is given out by Queen’s University in his honour.
- The Hawley Research Laboratories at Queen’s University are named after him
