= Henry C. Gunning =

Canadian geologist

Henry Cecil Gunning
- Born: September 9, 1901; Belfast, Ireland
- Died: 1991; Canada
- Citizenship: Canadian
- Education: University of British Columbia
- Awards: Barlow Memorial Medal; Logan Medal (1966)
- Scientific career
- Fields: Geology
- Workplaces: Geological Survey of Canada; University of British Columbia

Notes
- Gunningite, a mineral, is named after him.

Henry Cecil Gunning, FRSC (September 9, 1901 – 1991) was a Canadian geologist and academic. A mineral, gunningite, was named in his honour.

== Early life ==
Gunning was born in Belfast, Ireland. At the age of six his family moved to Vancouver, British Columbia. His father established a hardware business there.

Gunning earned a B.A.Sc. in Geological Engineering in 1924-25 from the University of British Columbia. He was one of the first two graduates from the UBC Geological Engineering program, started in 1921 . While at university he played on the rugby and soccer teams. After graduating he worked one summer as a contract miner in Stewart, British Columbia, before moving to Cambridge, Massachusetts to study at the Massachusetts Institute of Technology. By 1927 Gunning had earned his PhD. In 1928, he married Edith Frances Fitts.

== Career ==
After school, Dr. Gunning started working with the Geological Survey of Canada. He concentrated on survey in the geology and mineral deposits of British Columbia, with a focus on Vancouver Island. He also surveyed part of Quebec.

In 1939, he began his academic career with the University of British Columbia. As Head of the Department of Geology and Geography he both taught and performed research. In 1953, Gunning was promoted to the position of Dean of the Faculty of Applied Science. While he was Dean he also served as Director of the Geological Engineering Program. He surrendered that position in 1959 to travel to Rhodesia, Africa and conduct research. Dr. Gunning returned to Vancouver to practice private consulting and also to establish an engineering program at the British Columbia Institute of Technology.

== Awards and honours ==
- 1937, awarded Barlow Memorial Medal by the Canadian Institute of Mining, Metallurgy and Petroleum for his paper, Cadillac-Malartic Area, Quebec
- 1956, awarded an Honorary Doctor of Science Degree from UBC
- 1966, awarded Logan Medal from the Geological Association of Canada
- made a Fellow of the Royal Society of Canada
- Mineral named in his honour, Gunningite

== Often cited papers ==
- Gunning, H.C. (1930): Geology and Mineral Deposits of Quatsino-Nimpkish Area, Vancouver Island, British Columbia; in Summary Report 1929; Geological Survey of Canada, Part A, pages 94A-143A.
- Gunning, H.C. (1932): Preliminary Report on the Nimpkish Lake Quadrangle, Vancouver Island, British Columbia; in Summary Report 1931; Geological Survey of Canada, Part A, pages 22–35.
