= Emily Brodsky =

Geophysicist

Emily E. Brodsky
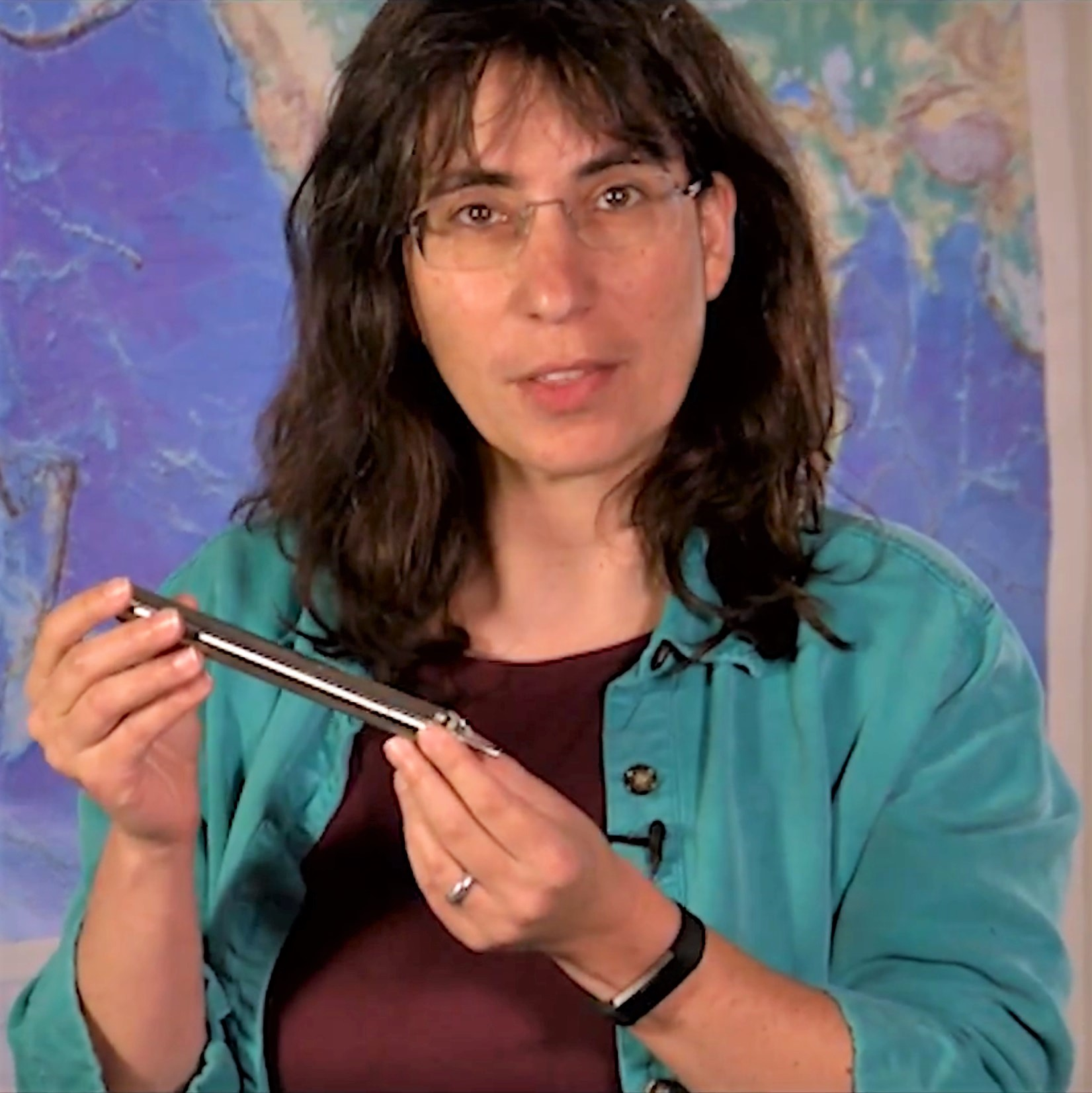
- Brodsky with undersea trench thermometer in 2017
- Education: Harvard University; California Institute of Technology
- Known for: Earthquake physics
- Awards: James B. Macelwane Medal (2008); George P. Woollard Award (2017); Price Medal (2021); Elected Member of the National Academy of Sciences (2023)
- Scientific career
- Workplaces: University of California, Santa Cruz

Emily E. Brodsky is a professor of Earth Sciences at the University of California, Santa Cruz. She studies the fundamental physical properties of earthquakes, as well as the seismology of volcanoes and landslides. In 2023, she was elected to the National Academy of Sciences.

== Early life and education ==
Brodsky earned her bachelor's degree magna cum laude at Harvard University in 1995. There, she set up Harvard Undergraduate Television. She moved to California for her PhD, completing her doctorate in 2001 from California Institute of Technology. She worked on rectified diffusion theory, the mechanism that describes how strain waves pump volatile organic compounds into bubbles. Rectified diffusion theory can move dynamic strain from a volcanic tremor or tectonic earthquake to static strain inside a magma chamber. Soon after graduating, Brodsky joined the University of California, Santa Cruz. There, she helped several National Science Foundation-MARGINS postdoctoral fellows, including Heather M. Savage and Christie D. Rowe, begin their careers in geophysics.

== Research and career ==
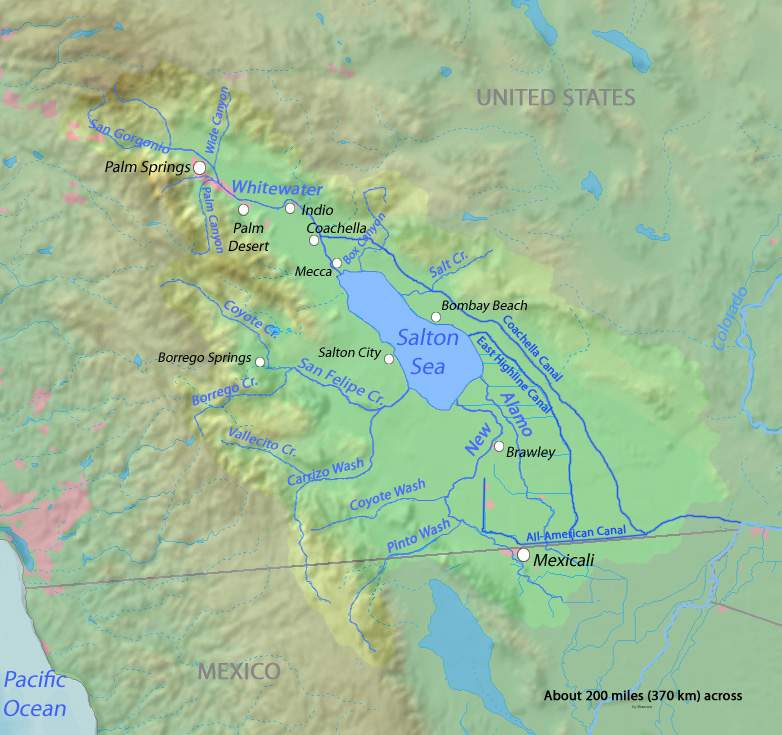
Map of the Salton Sea drainage area in the Salton Sink endorheic basin

Brodsky has extensively studied the physics of earthquakes. She has investigated what causes earthquakes to trigger, as well as their hydrogeology and fault zone structure. The impact of earthquakes on subsequent earthquakes ('triggering') is still not well understood. Brodsky demonstrated that seismic waves can trigger regional seismicity. She found that dynamic stress waves from one earthquake can initiate further earthquakes. She has challenged the idea that static stress controls earthquake triggering, and found that aftershocks have similar distributions as main shocks. She showed that using the amplitude of previous earthquakes it is possible to predict earthquake triggering at all distances. By studying the Salton Sea geothermal field, Brodsky showed that there was a relationship between human activity and seismic activity. Fault slips can cause nearby rocks to fracture, changing the shape of the surface underneath them and turning the rocks on the floor into powder.

Brodsky and collaborators demonstrated that seismic waves can unclog fractures, altering the permeability of fractured rocks. Her work furthermore identified that the build-up of pressure can cause changes in groundwater during earthquakes. After earthquakes, Brodsky has drilled deep within the fault zone to monitor the temperature. She studied the 2011 Tōhoku earthquake and tsunami, finding a series of temperature pulses that occur due to the flow of fluids through a zone of increased permeability. Immediately after an earthquake, the fault zone can be damaged and have higher permeability, but heals within a few months. Generally, earthquakes are triggered when tectonic stress overcomes friction, and Brodsky became interested in what causes this friction in the first place. Brodsky has shown that the coefficient of friction after the 2011 Tōhoku earthquake and tsunami was considerably lower than expected. Alongside earthquakes, Brodsky studies volcanoes, geysers, landslides and rivers. Occasionally, volcanoes are triggered by distant earthquakes. She predicted that, alongside growth of bubbles and overturn of magma chambers, volcanoes could be triggered by failure of rocks surrounding a magma chamber.

Brodsky serves on the board of directors for the Southern California Earthquake Center and the IRIS Consortium. She has written for The Conversation.

=== Awards ===
Her awards and honors include:

- 2005 Seismological Society of America Charles Richter Early Career Award
- 2008 American Geophysical Union James B. Macelwane Medal
- 2009 National Science Foundation Earthscope Distinguished Lecturer
- 2017 International Ocean Discovery Program Ocean Discovery Distinguished Lecturer
- 2019 Geological Society of America George P. Woollard Award
- 2021 Price Medal of the Royal Astronomical Society
- 2022 Nemmers Prize in Earth Sciences
- 2023 Elected to the National Academy of Sciences

== Selected publications ==
- K. R. Felzer; E. E. Brodsky (2006). "Decay of aftershock density with distance indicates triggering by dynamic stress". Nature. 441 (7094): 735–738. Bibcode:2006Natur.441..735F. doi:10.1038/nature04799. PMID 16760974. S2CID 4420165. Wikidata Q46112309.
- Q109325823; Emily E Brodsky; Duncan C Agnew (2006). "Seismic waves increase permeability". Nature. 441 (7097): 1135–1138. Bibcode:2006Natur.441.1135E. doi:10.1038/nature04798. PMID 16810253. S2CID 301536. Wikidata Q46060408.
- Emily E. Brodsky (2003). "A mechanism for sustained groundwater pressure changes induced by distant earthquakes". Journal of Geophysical Research. 108 (B8). Bibcode:2003JGRB..108.2390B. doi:10.1029/2002jb002321. S2CID 43062259. Wikidata Q59784553.
