= Christie D. Rowe =

American geologist (born 1978)

- Born: 1978 (age 47–48); Northern California
- Education: Smith College; University of California, Santa Cruz
- Awards: W. W. Hutchison Medal (2017)
- Scientific career
- Workplaces: University of California, Santa Cruz; University of Cape Town; McGill University

Christie D. Rowe (born 1978) is a Professor of Geology at McGill University. She holds a Canada Research Chair in Earthquake Geology and was awarded the 2017 Geological Association of Canada W. W. Hutchison Medal.

== Early life and education ==
Rowe is from Strawberry, Tuolumne County, Northern California. Rowe eventually studied geology at Smith College, where she worked on metamorphic rocks including blueschists and eclogites. She was taught by John Brady and H. Robert (Bob) Burger. In 2007, Rowe received her PhD from the University of California, Santa Cruz. Rowe's doctoral work with J. Casey Moore attempted to reconstruct the earthquake cycles in Kodiak Island. Rowe moved to South Africa in 2007 where she taught structural geology and plate tectonics at the University of Cape Town.

== Research and career ==
In 2009 Rowe was appointed an National Science Foundation-MARGINS postdoctoral scholar at the University of California, Santa Cruz, where she worked on geophysical observations, including study of the transient fluidisation of granular fault rocks in Alaska and Namibia with Emily Brodsky.

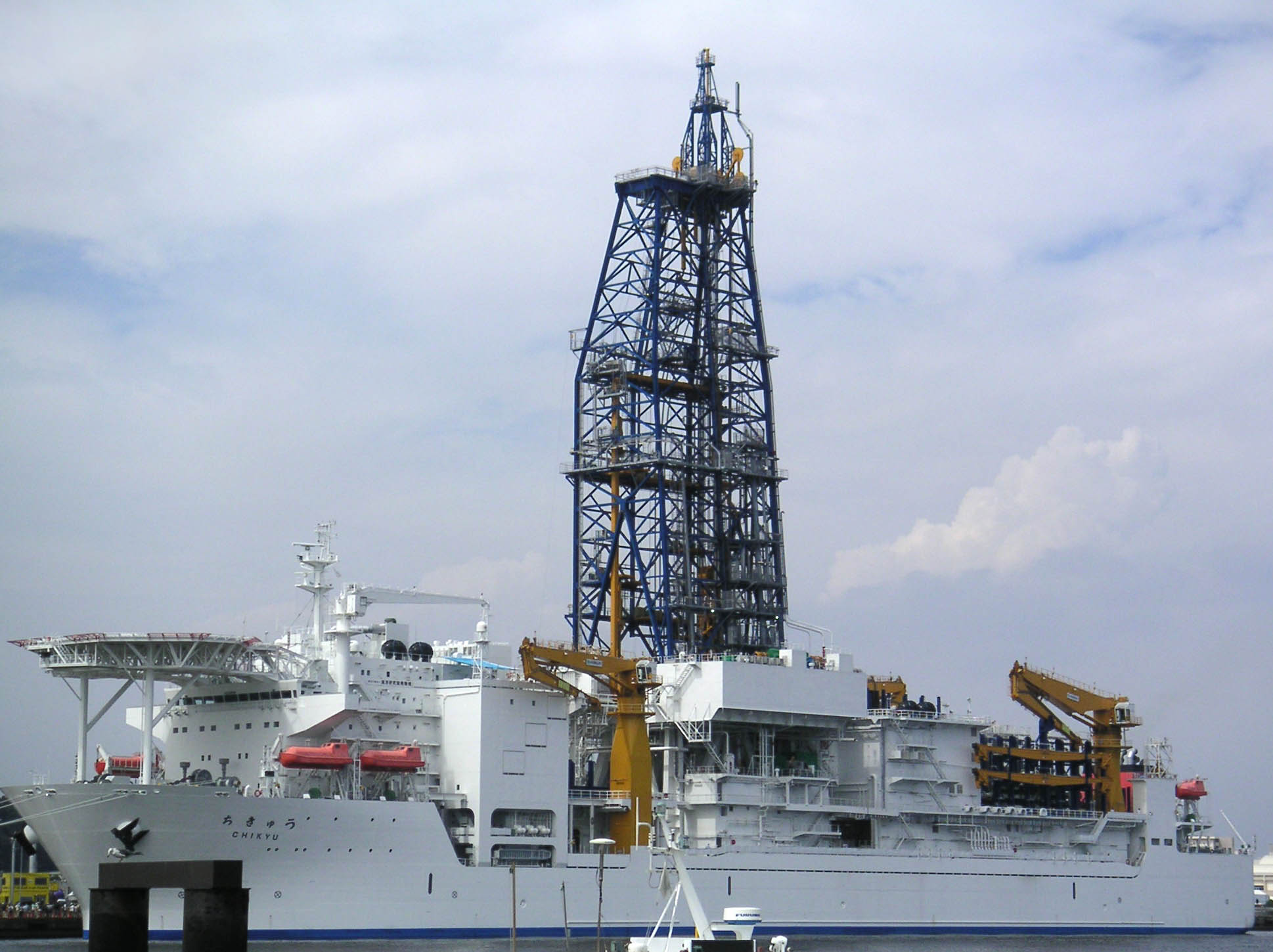
Deep-sea Drilling Vessel "CHIKYÜ".

In 2011 Rowe joined McGill University as a Wares Scholar in economic geology. Rowe works on earthquake processes, including research in seismology, structural geology and mineralogy. She has investigated fossilised earthquakes, including studying the fault that caused the 2011 Tōhoku earthquake and tsunami. Rowe was a member of the science party for Integrated Ocean Drilling Program Expedition 343 on the scientific drilling vessel, the Chikyū, to study the fault under the Japan Trench that slipped in the 2011 Tōhoku earthquake. Rowe is a member of the Southern California Earthquake Center, and has studied the Marin Headlands and other rocks of the Franciscan Complex.

Her work has included studying the vulnerability to destruction of pseudotachylites, which are described in her work as underreported when compared to earthquakes in active faults. She has studied exhumed fault zones, including pseudotachylite as an indicator of fossilised earthquake ruptures. Rowe's work has shown amorphous nanosilica as involved in the process of lubrication and healing of earthquakes.

In 2017 Rowe was awarded the Geological Association of Canada W.W. Hutchison Medal. That year she was also appointed a Canada Research Chair in earthquake geology. Rowe serves on the editorial board of the Journal of Structural Geology and the Geological Society of America's journals Geology (journal) and Lithosphere.

=== Awards and honours ===
- 2020 Francis Birch lecturer for the Tectonophysics Division of the American Geophysical Union
- 2017 McGill University Principal's Prize for Outstanding Emerging Researchers
- 2016 Geological Society of America Outstanding Publication Award
