= Glamour (magazine) =

American women's fashion magazine

- Cover of the June 2024 issue (digital), Lupita Nyong'o by Adrienne Raquel
- Categories: Women's
- Founder: Condé Montrose Nast
- First issue: April 1939; 87 years ago
- Final issue: January 2019 (print)
- Company: Condé Nast (1939–present)
- Country: United States
- Based in: One World Trade Center; New York, NY 10007; U.S.
- Language: English
- Website: glamour.com
- ISSN: 0017-0747

Glamour (stylized in all caps), previously known as Glamour of Hollywood, is an American digital women's fashion magazine that covers fashion, beauty, wellness, and entertainment.

Based at One World Trade Center in the Financial District of New York City and published by Condé Nast. It began publication in 1939 as a guide to 'the Hollywood way to Fashion, Beauty, and Charm'. In 1943 it rebranded with the subtitle 'for the girl with the job', it later evolved into a progressive women's magazine. The print edition was suspended from January 2019 and the title continues on digital platforms.

Glamour Paris (now defunct) was launched in 1988, as the first international edition of the title. As of 2026, there are 6 international editions of which only one is published by Condé Nast, the remaining 5 editions are published under licence.

In April 2026, Condé Nast laid off much of the remaining U.S. editorial staff, including editor-in-chief Samantha Barry, and subsequently confirmed that the brand would be focused on fashion-related shopping articles, generating revenue through display ads and affiliate marketing.

== Background ==
Glamour was launched in 1939. The magazine was published as a monthly until 2017, when it introduced a combined July/August issue, the magazine then ceased publication in January 2019. It continues on digital platforms.

Glamour has been published by Condé Nast since 1939.

=== Editors ===
Editor-in-Chief	Start year	End year
Alice Thompson	1939	1941
Elizabeth Penrose	1941	1953
Nina Kyle	1953	1954
Kathleen Aston Casey	1954	1967
Ruth Whitney	1967	1998
Bonnie Fuller	1998	2001
Cynthia Leive	2001	2017
Samantha Barry	2018	2026

== History ==
In August 1943, the magazine changed its name to Glamour, with the subtitle for the girl with the job. The magazine was published in a larger format than most of its contemporaries at the time. Charm, a Street & Smith magazine, started in 1941, later subtitled "the magazine for women who work", was folded into Glamour magazine in 1959.

Old logo used from 2018 to 2023

Glamour was the first women's magazine to feature an African-American cover girl when it included Katiti Kironde on the cover of its college issue in August 1968.

Since 1990, the magazine has held an annual "Woman of the Year" awards ceremony.

On January 8, 2018, it was announced that Samantha Barry, previously the Head of Social Media and Emerging Media at CNN, would be the new Editor-in-Chief of Glamour.

In November 2018, Glamour announced that its print edition would cease with its January 2019 issue in order to focus on its digital presence.

In 2023 the magazine featured Logan Brown, a pregnant transgender man on the cover.

== Awards ==
=== Glamour Women of the Year Awards ===
Each autumn, the magazine organizes the "Glamour Women of the Year Awards", which recognize women in the public eye. In 2007, golfer Lorena Ochoa won the award. In 2008, the award was bestowed on two Yemenis: 10-year-old divorcee Nujood Ali, and the lawyer who took on her case. Nujood's courage was praised at the award ceremony by prominent attendees, including Hillary Clinton and Condoleezza Rice.

=== Glamour Top College Women Awards ===
Beginning in 1957, the magazine selected a top ten list of outstanding college women across the country. Originally, the list was composed of the best dressed college juniors in America, but was changed for more substance with categories such as academic achievement, community service, and career goals as leading criteria. Hundreds of college juniors apply each year. Past winners and finalists include Martha Stewart, Diane Sawyer, and Swati Mia Saini.

== International editions ==
=== Operating ===
- Glamour UK (since 2001; print edition ceased)
- Glamour Polska (since 2003)
- Glamour Hungary (since 2004)
- Glamour South Africa (since 2004)
- Glamour Bulgaria (since 2009)
- Glamour Brasil (since 2012)
- Glamour Australia (since 2026)

=== Defunct ===
- Glamour Italia (from 1976 to 2019)
- Glamour Paris (from 1988 to 1995 and then from 2004 to 2020)
- Glamour México y Latinoamérica (from 1998 to 2026)
- Glamour Deutsch (from 2001 to 2026)
- Glamour España (from 2002 to 2026)
- Glamour Russia (from 2004 to 2022)
- Glamour Netherlands (from 2005 to 2021)
- Glamour Sweden (from 2005 to 2010)
- Glamour Romania (from 2006 to 2024)
- Glamour Ísland (from 2015 to 2018)
- Glamour Turkiye (from 2016 to 2016)
- Glamour Greece (ceased publication in 2012)

Glamour launched in the UK in April 2001, where it pioneered the "handbag size" format, with the tagline "fits in your life as well as your handbag". Each September, the magazine held "National Glamour Week", when it featured extra coupons and competitions. In 2016, Glamour UK launched the Glamour Beauty Festival, on a new off-page beauty event featuring demonstrations, treatments and speakers.

From its launch to the final traditional issue in November 2017, the magazine was edited by Jo Elvin, with Michelle Pamment serving as acting editor briefly in 2005. In June 2009, to celebrate Glamour's eighth birthday in the UK, Glamour.com made a gallery of every cover since its launch. In October 2017, following declining sales, it was announced that publication of the monthly UK edition would end at the end of 2017, and that the UK version would be a semi-annual publication. In November 2017, Deborah Joseph was appointed Chief Content Officer of Glamour UK.

The Italian edition of Glamour was launched in December 1976, under the title Lei (She), then officially renamed Glamour, like its U.S. counterpart, in 1992. The Russian edition was established in 2004, and is published monthly.

In April 2026, the magazine announced its international editions in Germany, Spain and Mexico will cease.

== Editors of international editions ==
Country	Circulation dates	Editor-in-chief	Start year	End year
France (Glamour Paris)	1988–1995			
France (Glamour Paris)	2004–2020	Marie Lannelongue	2004	2014
France (Glamour Paris)	2004–2020	Céline Perruche	2017	2020
Italy (Glamour Italia)	1992–2019	Grazia d'Annunzio	1992	1994
Italy (Glamour Italia)	1992–2019	Valeria Corbetta	1994	2003
Italy (Glamour Italia)	1992–2019	Danda Santini	2003	2004
Italy (Glamour Italia)	1992–2019	Paola Centomo	2004	2013
Italy (Glamour Italia)	1992–2019	Cristina Lucchini	2013	2019
Mexico/Latin America (Glamour México y Latinoamérica)	1998–2026	Mar Abascal	2007	2012
Mexico/Latin America (Glamour México y Latinoamérica)	1998–2026	Lucy Lara	2012	2017
Mexico/Latin America (Glamour México y Latinoamérica)	1998–2026	Valeria Pérez	2017	present
United Kingdom (Glamour UK)	2001–present	Jo Elvin	2001	2017
United Kingdom (Glamour UK)	2001–present	Deborah Joseph	2017	present
Germany (Glamour DE)	2001–2026	Nikolaus Albrecht	2004	2008
Germany (Glamour DE)	2001–2026	Andrea Ketterer	2008	2020
Germany (Glamour DE)	2001–2026	Georg Wittmann	2020	2023
Germany (Glamour DE)	2001–2026	Theresa Pichler	2023	present
Spain (Glamour ES)	2002–2026	Alicia Parro	2002	2019
Spain (Glamour ES)	2002–2026	Carmen Mañana	2022	present
Poland (Glamour Polska)	2003–present	Anna Jurgás	2009	2018
Poland (Glamour Polska)	2003–present	Katarzyna Dabrowska	2018	present
Hungary (Glamour Hungary)	2004–present	Krisztina Maróy	2004	present
South Africa (Glamour South Africa)	2004–present	Pnina Fenster	2004	2018
South Africa (Glamour South Africa)	2004–present	Asanda Sizani	2018	2019
South Africa (Glamour South Africa)	2004–present	Nontando Mposo	2019	present
Russia (Glamour)	2004–2022	Masha Fedorova	2010	2018
Russia (Glamour)	2004–2022	Ilyana Erdneeva	2018	2022
Netherlands (Glamour Netherlands)	2005–2021	Karin Swerink	2005	2012
Netherlands (Glamour Netherlands)	2005–2021	Anke de Jong		
Romania (Glamour Romania)	2006–2024	Diana Tofan	2007	2024
Bulgaria (Glamour Bulgaria)	2009–present	Ani Miladenova	2009	
Brazil (Glamour Brasil)	2012–present	Monica Salgado	2012	2017
Brazil (Glamour Brasil)	2012–present	Paula Merlo	2017	2018
Brazil (Glamour Brasil)	2012–present	Barbara Tavares	2024	present
Iceland (Glamour Ísland)	2015–2018	Álfrún Pálsdóttir	2015	2018
Turkey (Glamour Turkiye)	2016–2016	Özge Sarikadilar	2016	2016
Australia (Glamour Australia)	2026–present	Remy Rippon	2026	present

== Lucky magazine ==
Content from the Condé Nast magazine Lucky, which offered fashion and shopping advice, was periodically included on the Glamour website. Since Lucky ceased operations in 2015, the website has continued to feature shopping tips under a section titled "Lucky Magazine".

== See also ==
- Helen Valentine, founder and editor-in-chief, Charm magazine
- Cipe Pineles, Charm magazine art director
- Picture Play (magazine)
