= Samantha Barry =

Irish journalist and editor

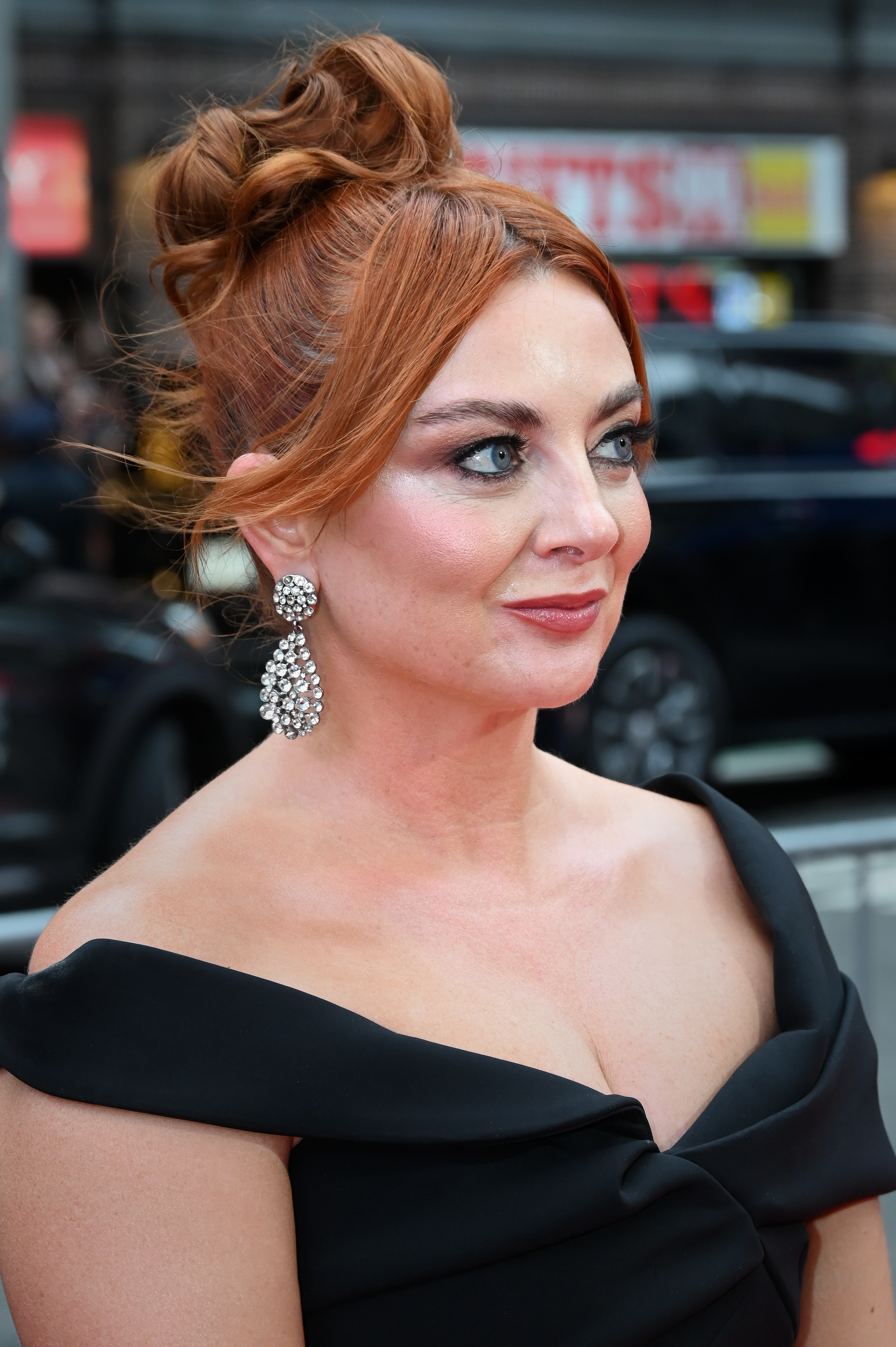
- Barry in 2025
- Born: 1981 or 1982 (age 44–45); Cork, Ireland
- Known for: CNN head of social media, editor of Glamour BBC News, RTE News

Samantha Barry (born 1981/2) is an Irish journalist who served as the editor-in-chief of Glamour from 2018 to 2026.

== Career ==
Barry was born in Ballincollig, Cork, Ireland, to Máiréad and David Barry, and graduated with an Arts degree in English and Psychology from University College Cork and an MA in Journalism from Dublin City University.

Starting with The University Examiner, Barry has worked as a reporter and journalist for RTÉ, the Australian Broadcasting Corporation, Newstalk, the BBC, and CNN, where she was an executive producer for CNN Worldwide.

Barry led news coverage from the 2016 presidential election and interviewed all the candidates. Led by Barry, CNN's 2016 election coverage received the first ever Edward R. Murrow Award for excellence in social media and a Webby Award recognizing the same 2016 campaign work. Barry has also worked as a guest lecturer at Yale University and is a Sulzberger Fellow at Columbia University.

=== Glamour magazine ===
In 2018, she was announced as the editor of the US edition of women's magazine Glamour. She is the eighth editor since the magazine's founding in 1939. Barry is the first person never to have worked in print media before leading a Condé Nast magazine. Under Barry's editorship, the US edition of the magazine ceased publishing a monthly print edition to focus on a digital-first model. The January 2019 issue was the last monthly US print issue of Glamour. In 2026, it was announced that Barry was exiting Glamour.

== Personal life ==
Barry lives near Gramercy Park in New York City.
