= Ann Gargett =

Canadian physical oceanographer

Ann Elizabeth Gargett
- Citizenship: Canadian
- Education: University of Manitoba, University of British Columbia
- Scientific career
- Thesis: Internal waves in the Strait of Georgia (1970)

Ann Gargett is a Canadian oceanographer known for her research on measuring turbulence and its impact on biological processes in marine ecosystems.

== Education and career ==
Gargett has B.Sc. in mathematics and physics from the University of Manitoba (1966) and Ph.D. in physics from the University of British Columbia (1970). Subsequently she held a NATO postdoctoral fellowship at the National Institute of Oceanography (in the United Kingdom) and was a Green's Fellow at Scripps Institution of Oceanography. She has held multiple positions at the Institute of Ocean Sciences and as of 2008 is an Emerita Senior Scientist. In 2001, she joined Old Dominion University as a professor and transitioned into emerita professor in 2008. She also an adjunct professor at Skidaway Institute of Oceanography. In 2021, Gargett was on the faculty at Semester at Sea and was a senior research scientist at the Canadian Institute of Ocean Sciences.

Gargett was an invited plenary session speaker for the 1989 inaugural meeting of The Oceanography Society, a speaker at the Munk Centennial Symposium in May 15, 2017, and gave the 2004 Rachel Carson lecture for the American Geophysical Union meeting.

== Research ==
Gargett's research encompasses turbulence, internal waves, and the connections between mixing in the water column and biological processes. Her research on turbulence levels in shallow waters has identified Langmuir supercells, or large-scale Langmuir circulation, that cause extensive mixing of sediment in the coastal zone. Working with biologists, Gargett has examined how the vertical movement of phytoplankton in the water column impacts light availability. She proposed the 'optimal stability window' which considered how the stability of the water column determines the relationship between fish abundance and the strength of the Aleutian Low. The link between physics and fish explored in this paper raised questions about gaps in marine science that should be addressed in order to further research linking fisheries with physical oceanography

=== Selected publications ===
- Gargett, A. E. (1984-05-01). "Vertical eddy diffusivity in the ocean interior". Journal of Marine Research. 42 (2): 359–393. doi:10.1357/002224084788502756.
- Gargett, Ann E. (1997). "The optimal stability 'window': a mechanism underlying decadal fluctuations in North Pacific salmon stocks?". Fisheries Oceanography. 6 (2): 109–117. doi:10.1046/j.1365-2419.1997.00033.x. ISSN 1365-2419.
- Denman, K. L.; Gargett, A. E. (1983). "Time and space scales of vertical mixing and advection of phytoplankton in the upper ocean". Limnology and Oceanography. 28 (5): 801–815. Bibcode:1983LimOc..28..801D. doi:10.4319/lo.1983.28.5.0801. ISSN 1939-5590.

== Awards ==
- Fellow, Science Academy of the Royal Society of Canada (1991)
- H. Burr Steinbach Visiting Scholar, Woods Hole Oceanographic Institution (1991)
- Rachel Carson Lecture, American Geophysical Union (2004)
- Tully Medal, Canadian Meteorological and Oceanographic Society (2015)
- Willet G. Miller Medal, Royal Society of Canada (2018)
- Honoured alumni award, University of Manitoba (2021)
