= Goslarite =

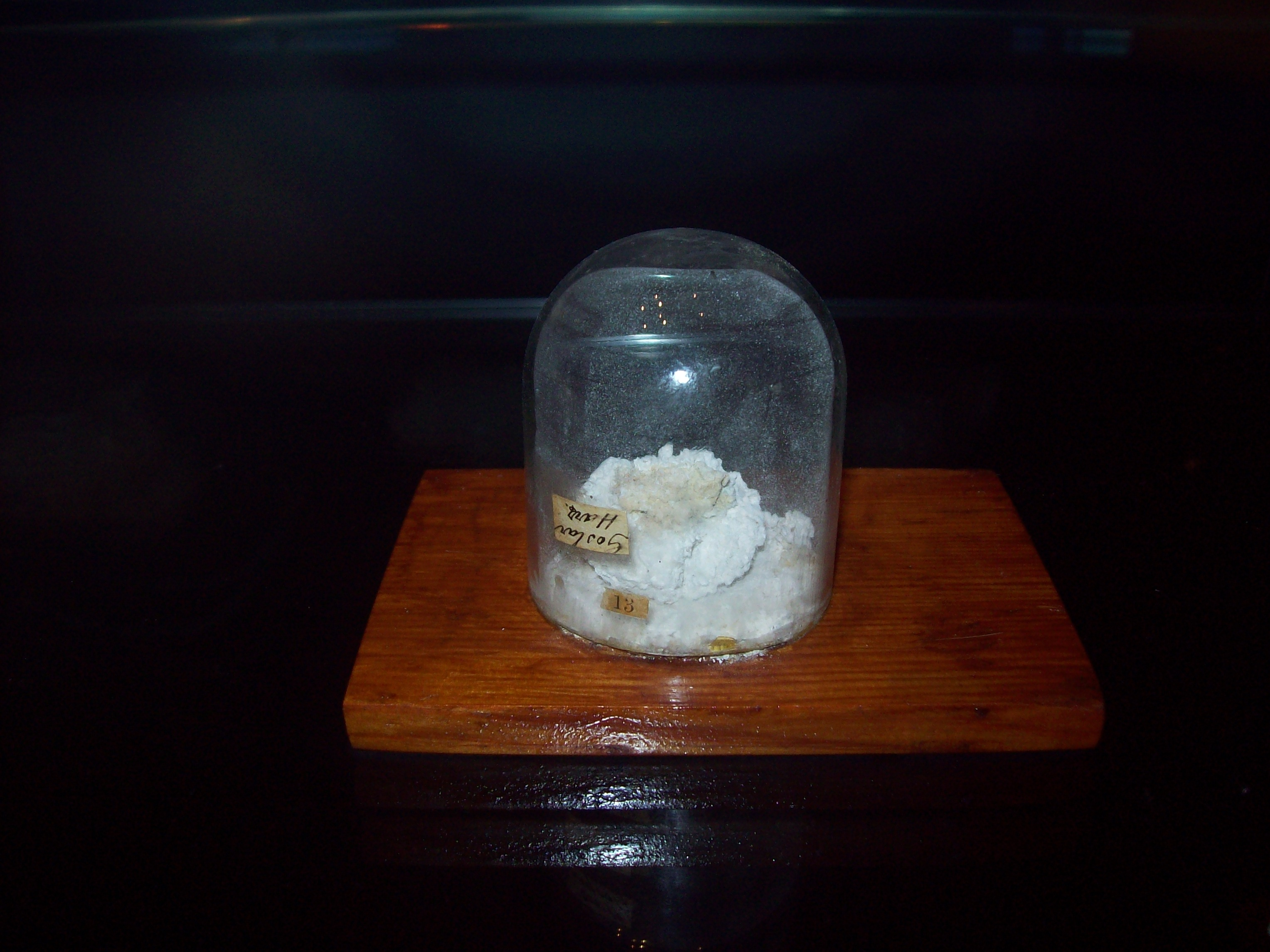
- Goslarite on display at the Museo Nacional de Ciencias Naturales

General
- Category: Sulfate mineral
- Formula: ZnSO_{4}·7H_{2}O
- IMA symbol: Gos
- Strunz classification: 7.CB.40
- Crystal system: Orthorhombic
- Crystal class: Disphenoidal (222) (same H-M symbol)
- Space group: P2_{1}2_{1}2_{1}
- Unit cell: a = 11.8176 Å, b = 12.0755 Å c = 6.827 Å, Z = 4

Identification
- Formula mass: 287.56 g/mol
- Color: Colorless, pinkish, white, greenish, green, blue, green blue, bluish and brownish
- Crystal habit: Acicular, massive, stalactitic
- Cleavage: {010} perfect
- Fracture: Conchoidal
- Tenacity: Brittle
- Mohs scale hardness: 2.0–2.5
- Luster: Vitreous (glassy)
- Streak: White
- Specific gravity: 1.96
- Optical properties: Biaxial (-)
- Refractive index: n_{α} = 1.447 - 1.463 n_{β} = 1.475 - 1.480 n_{γ} = 1.470 - 1.485
- Birefringence: δ = 0.0220–0.0230
- Pleochroism: none
- 2V angle: 46°

Goslarite is a hydrated zinc sulfate mineral (ZnSO_{4} · 7 H_{2}O) which was first found in the Rammelsberg mine, Goslar, Harz, Germany. It was described in 1847. Goslarite belongs to the epsomite group which also includes epsomite (MgSO_{4} · 7 H_{2}O) and morenosite (NiSO_{4} · 7 H_{2}O). Goslarite is an unstable mineral at the surface and will dehydrate to other minerals like bianchite (ZnSO_{4} · 6 H_{2}O), boyleite (ZnSO_{4} · 4 H_{2}O) and gunningite (ZnSO_{4} · H_{2}O).

== Physical properties ==
The composition of goslarite was determined by the US National Bureau of Standards (now the National Institute of Standards and Technology) in 1959 as follows: SO_{3} 27.84 wt%, ZnO 28.30 wt% and H_{2}O 43.86 wt%.

Goslarite's cleavage is perfect in {010}, as for epsomite and morenosite. The color of goslarite ranges from brownish to pinkish, blue, brown, colorless, green and green blue. The luster ranges from vitreous to nacreous and silky (if fibrous). Goslarite is soluble in water, has an astringent taste, and is strongly diamagnetic.

== Geologic occurrence ==
Goslarite is formed from the oxidation of sphalerite ((Zn, Fe)S). It was first found in Rammelsberg mine, Goslar, Harz, Germany. It often occurs as an efflorescence on timbers and walls of mine passages. Goslarite is widespread as a post mining efflorescence in mines that contain sphalerite or any zinc minerals.

== Economical uses ==
In the pharmaceutical industry it is used as a direct emetic, antiseptic and disinfectant.
