= John Ross Mackay =

Canadian geographer

John Ross Mackay, OC FRSC (偕約翰, December 31, 1915 – October 28, 2014) was a Canadian geographer. He is most noted for his explorations of permafrost phenomena in the western Canadian Arctic. His 40 plus years of study has enabled the building of pipeline operations and petroleum explorations in areas of frozen ground. The Royal Society of Canada stated the following when Mackay was awarded the Willet G. Miller Medal in 1975:

As a research worker with a superb talent of combining three elements – theory, design of simple but effective instruments, and skilled and careful field observations – he has met the challenges of applied science. In the field of permafrost studies he has attained a stature equal to the best from the USA and USSR and in so doing has enhanced Canadian science.

== Early life ==
Mackay was born in Formosa (Taiwan) (then under Japanese rule) to George William Mackay and Jean Ross Mackay, as well as brother to siblings Leslie, Anna, Margaret and Isabel Minnie (1917–2012). His grandfather was George Leslie Mackay, who was instrumental in bringing Christianity and public health care to Northern Taiwan (Formosa). The Mackay Memorial Hospital was named after his ancestor.

Mackay completed a B.A. at Clark University in 1939. He obtained an M.A. from Boston University in 1941. That same year he left his studies to join the war effort. Mackay enlisted in the Canadian Army. Mackay completed training near Toronto and further training as a private (gunner) at a large artillery camp in Petawawa, on the Ottawa River. He was commissioned an Officer (Lieutenant) by 1942. Before the Second World War ended he attained the rank of major in the Canadian Intelligence Corps. He was stationed in Ottawa until he was discharged in 1946.

== Career ==
In September 1946 Mackay joined McGill University's Department of Geography as an assistant professor. His first paper on "The North Shore of the Ottawa River, Quyon to Montebello, Quebec" was published in the Revue Canadienne de Geographie, Volume 1 in 1947. In 1949 he obtained a Ph.D. from the Université de Montréal. Later that year he accepted a position at the University of British Columbia as an assistant professor with the Department of Geology and Geography. In 1953 Mackay was promoted to associate professor and became a full professor in 1957.

Mackay gained international scientific recognition through his experimental and field investigations in geography, and especially on the topic of permafrost. He published over two hundred scientific communications, adding extensive research contributions in the Quaternary sciences. From 1981 until his death he was an Emeritus Professor at the University of British Columbia, continuing to teach (voluntarily) a graduate course and undertake field research in the western Arctic, and has published over fifty papers in refereed journals.

== Personal ==
Mackay married Violet Meekins in 1944. They had two daughters, Anne and Leslie. Violet died in 1997. Mackay died in Kelowna, British Columbia, at the age of 98 on October 28, 2014.

== Past positions ==
- President of the Canadian Association of Geographers (1953–54)
- President of the American Association of Geographers (1969–70)
- Vice-president of the International Geographical Union
- founding Secretary General of the International Permafrost Association (1983–93)
- Chairman of the Board of Governors of the Arctic Institute of North America
- Honorary Member of the Chinese Society of Glaciology
- Honorary Member of the Chinese Society of Geocryology
- Honorary Member of the Geographical Society of the U.S.S.R.

== Honours and distinctions ==
- made a Fellow of the Royal Society of Canada
- made a foreign Fellow of the Russian Academy of Natural Sciences
- awarded the Scholarly Merit Award by the Canadian Association of Geographers
- awarded the Roger J. E. Brown Memorial Award by the Canadian Geotechnical Society
- awarded the G. K. Gilbert Award by the Association of American Geographers
- awarded the Kirk Bryan Award by the Geological Society of America
- The Canadian Geomorphological Research Group gives out the J. Ross Mackay Award annually
- 1967, awarded the Massey Medal by the Royal Canadian Geographical Society
- 1967, awarded a Centennial Medal by the Government of Canada
- 1972, awarded honorary doctorate from the University of Ottawa
- 1975, awarded Willet G. Miller Medal by the Royal Society of Canada
- 1977, awarded a Silver Jubilee Medal by the Government of Canada
- 1981, awarded honorary doctorate from the University of Waterloo
- 1981, appointed an Officer of the Order of Canada
- 1984, awarded the Centenary Medal for Northern Science by the Government of Canada, presented by Governor General Jeanne Sauvé
- 1986, awarded the Vega Gold Medal by the Swedish Society for Anthropology and Geography, presented by the Carl XVI Gustaf, the King of Sweden
- 1986, awarded honorary doctorate from the University of Victoria
- 1987, awarded honorary doctorate from the University of British Columbia
- 1991, awarded Logan Medal by the Geological Association of Canada
- 1993, awarded W. A. Johnston Medal by the Canadian Quaternary Association
- 2007, an issue of the journal Permafrost and Periglacial Processes (Volume 18 no. 1) was produced in honour of his 90th birthday
- 2010, awarded the first Lifetime Achievement Award of the International Permafrost Association
