= R. Paul Young =

Geophysicist

- Born: Robert Paul Young; April 4, 1952 (age 74); Preston, Lancashire, United Kingdom
- Education: Newcastle University; University of London; Council for National Academic Awards
- Known for: rock burst, seismicity, induced seismicity, acoustic emission
- Awards: Willet G. Miller Medal; Queen Elizabeth II Diamond Jubilee Medal
- Scientific career
- Fields: geophysics, rock mechanics, mining, radioactive waste management
- Workplaces: University of Toronto (2002-); University of Liverpool (1999-2002); Keele University (1993-1999); Queen's University (1984-1993)

R. Paul Young, FREng, FRSC, (born April 4, 1952) is a geophysicist and professor who works in rock mechanics using induced seismicity to monitor fractures and rock damage for engineering applications in mining and radioactive waste management.

== Career ==
He is Professor and W.M. Keck Chair Emeritus at the University of Toronto. He was the Honorary International Secretary (2019-2025) of the Royal Society of Canada and Chair of the Canadian Science Publishing Board of Directors (2023-2025). He was previously the Vice-president, Research and Innovation at the University of Toronto (2007–2014), Chair of the TRIUMF Board of Management, Canada's National Particle Accelerator Centre (2010–2014), and Chair of the research committee of the U15 group of Canadian Research Universities (2012–2014). He was previously president of the British Geophysical Association (2000–2002) and Professor at the University of Liverpool (1999–2002), Keele University (1993–1999), and Queen's University (1984–1993).

== Research ==
He is known for his research into rock bursts and seismicity in Canadian mines, and induced seismicity and acoustic emission experiments for monitoring excavation induced damage at Atomic Energy of Canada's Underground Research Laboratory, and rock mechanical testing and geophysics to study and simulate rock fracturing.

== Honours and awards ==
In 2007, he was made a Fellow of the Royal Society of Canada and in 2009 was awarded the Willet G. Miller Medal of the Royal Society of Canada. In 2011 he was made a Senior Fellow of Massey College and Fellow of the American Association for the Advancement of Science. In 2012, he was awarded the Queen Elizabeth II Diamond Jubilee Medal, and in 2018 he was made a Fellow of the Royal Academy of Engineering. In 2025 he was awarded the King Charles III Coronation Medal
