= Centennial College =

Centennial College may refer to:

- Centennial College (Canada), a public college in Toronto, Ontario, Canada
- Centennial College (Hong Kong), a private college in Pok Fu Lam, Hong Kong Island, Hong Kong
