= Harvard Undergraduate Television =

Former student internet broadcast organization

Harvard Undergraduate Television (HUT V)
- Type: Internet television network
- Country: United States
- Availability: Online, internationally
- Key people: Derek Flanzraich, Eric Paternot, Emily Brodsky, Maxwell Whittington-Cooper
- Launch date: 1975 (as "Harvard-Radcliffe Film Workshop")
- Former names: Harvard-Radcliffe Film Workshop (1975–1992); Harvard-Radcliffe Television (1992–2009)
- Official website: www.hutvnetwork.com

Harvard Undergraduate Television (HUTV) is a Harvard College student television station that formerly broadcast live to the Internet between 2009 and 2013, but has continued making content on places like YouTube since then.

HUTV carried original, student-produced content from eleven shows and from individual Harvard students. HUTV shows included Ivory Tower, On Harvard Time (an award-winning comedy news show), and video reports by The Harvard Crimson (Harvard's daily student newspaper). The network had a full production studio and post-production editing facilities in Pforzheimer House, a Harvard dormitory. HUTV last updated its programming and website in 2013, and is now defunct.

HUTV, under the guidance of co-President Derek Flanzraich, replaced then-defunct Harvard-Radcliffe Television (HRTV) on April 6, 2009, inheriting HRTV's shows and staff.

== History ==
=== Harvard-Radcliffe Film Workshop (HRFW) ===
In 1975, Bob Doyle who was then working as a research fellow in Harvard's Department of Visual and Environmental Studies, founded the Harvard-Radcliffe Film Workshop (HRFW), which offered filmmaking instruction and film screenings in the Morse Music Library in the basement of Pforzheimer House, which was then known as North House.

In the 1980s, Doyle helped form the Desktop Video Group to "support undergraduate video production and television distribution" at Brown and Harvard Universities.

=== Harvard-Radcliffe Television (HRTV) ===
The HRTV logo

In 1992, Emily Brodsky founded Harvard-Radcliffe Television (HRTV). That same year, Ivory Tower, the Ivy League's oldest soap opera, became one of HRTV's first shows.

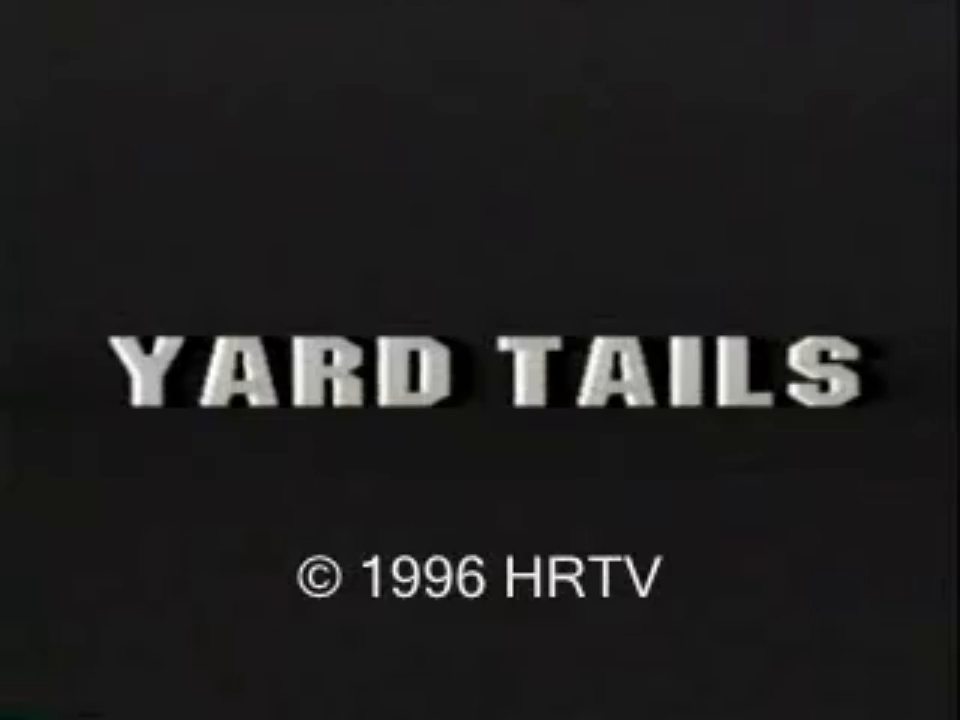
Title card of student film project named "Yard Tails"

Until 1996, HRTV's shows were edited using Desktop Video Group equipment. In 1996, the Morse Music Library, which had previously been the site of HRFW's instruction sessions and film screenings, was re-organized into a television studio for HRTV, overseen by Doyle and aided financially by Pforzheimer House.

In its early years, HRTV screened its shows in dormitory common rooms and dining halls, as well as on various Cambridge Public-access television cable TV channels. In 2006, HRTV began posting all of its shows exclusively online, though episodes of Ivory Tower had been posted online before then.

Several prominent Harvard alumni in the film and television industries have been members of the HRTV Honorary Board of Advisers, including Matt Damon, Conan O'Brien, Mira Sorvino, Jack Lemmon, Elisabeth Shue, and John Lithgow.

=== Harvard Undergraduate Television (HUTV) ===
On April 6, 2009, HRTV relaunched as Harvard Undergraduate Television, under the direction of co-president Derek Flanzraich. The transformation included a new website and a short promotional video featuring Harvard professor and prominent psychologist Steven Pinker smashing a television and telling viewers to "get with the times" by watching television online.

== Current Shows ==
=== HUTV Productions ===
HUTV currently produces eight shows.

- Ivory Tower - Created in 1992 by Sara Alexandra Bibel and Andrea N. Moore, Ivory Tower is HUTV's longest-running show and the Ivy League's oldest soap opera, and according to the show's staff the oldest college soap opera. In fall 2008, Ivory Tower switched from a soap opera format to a situation comedy format. It has been popular not only on the Harvard campus but also, since being posted online, in South Korea.
- Respectably French! - A sketch comedy show created by Nicholas Krasney, Ho Tuan, and Matthew Tai, Respectably French! is currently in its fifth season. In addition to popular sketch comedy programming, the show has interviewed and been endorsed by celebrities such as Kevin Nealon of Saturday Night Live, Eric Idle of Monty Python, Homestar Runner, and Pleasureman Gunther. In 2008, Respectably French! has also covered ROFLCon and the 2008 Republican National Convention.
- On Harvard Time - HUTV's satirical news show, modeled after The Daily Show, presents and comments on news at Harvard in a comedic fashion. Currently in its fourth season, On Harvard Time produces weekly episodes as well as periodic humorous interviews with both Harvard and national public figures, such as Harvard Dean of Admissions William Fitzsimmons, Deputy White House Chief of Staff Karl Rove, and 2008 U.S. Presidential candidate Mike Gravel. On Harvard Time's November 2008 "Harvard Yale Aid" video, mocking Yale University before the annual Harvard-Yale football game, was named 2008 Ivy League Video of the Year by IvyGate Blog. Founded and created by Derek Flanzraich in 2006, today it is "HUTV's most popular show."
- Crimson Edition - A long-form news documentary show, Crimson Edition made its debut in 1995. It was relaunched with a more serious focus in 2006 by Executive Producer Eric Paternot, and is inspired by television news magazines such as 60 Minutes. Past topics have included Harvard's African-American community and the situation of the homeless in Harvard Square.
- HUTV News - Founded in 2007, HUTV News is HUTV's short-form news show, producing shorter reports than Crimson Edition on a wider range of topics. Before HRTV became HUTV, HUTV News was called HRTV News.
- Harvard Hooligans - This comedic show follows a group of college roommates. Most Harvard Hooligans episodes depict them speaking into a webcam and portraying a stereotypically nerdy students commenting on Harvard events. However, members have also interviewed comedian Will Ferrell, covered the 2008 Democratic National Convention, and run for president of the Harvard student body over the course of the show.
- Love@Harvard - Modeled after The Dating Game, Love@Harvard is a show in which three students compete to win a date with another student contestant. It debuted in November 2008.
- H-Biz Tonight - Formerly HBS TV Market Minute with Mia Saini, H-Biz Tonight features short daily reports from Harvard Business School student Mia Saini on economic news.

=== Content Partners ===
HUTV also currently features three "content partners" on its site. These shows are not produced by HUTV staff, but according to HUTV's website "HUTV distributes their content as part of [their] mission to connect media groups on the Harvard campus."

- The Harvard Crimson Video - Video reports from The Harvard Crimson, Harvard University's daily student newspaper. The Crimson began producing videos in March 2009 as part of its "Project Sorrento", an effort to modernize the paper's website through the use of multimedia.
- UCTV - Biweekly addresses from the President of the Harvard Undergraduate Council (UC), Harvard's student government, to the Harvard student body, modeled on the weekly United States presidential address.
- The Yard - An improvised "docu-soap" about six Harvard undergraduates, premiered in 2009 and produced jointly by students at Harvard and Emerson College.
