= Alfred Fitzpatrick =

Reverend Alfred Fitzpatrick
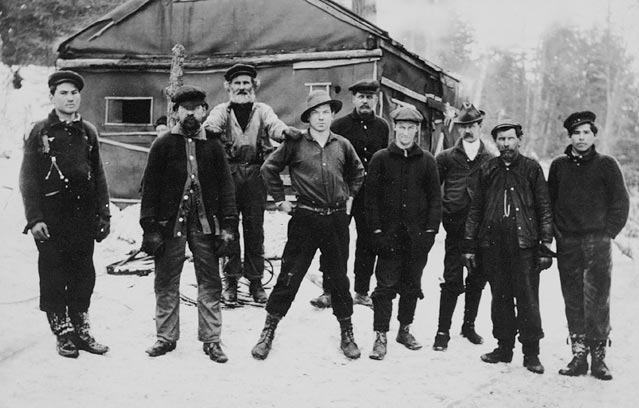
- Victoria Harbour Lumber Co., Martin's camp. Alfred Fitzpatrick, founder of Frontier College, standing 3rd from right. 1911 / Pinage (?) Lake, Ont. Dr. Norman Bethune is standing straddle legs with hands on hips.
- Born: 22 April 1862; Pictou County, Nova Scotia
- Died: 16 June 1936 (aged 74); Toronto, Ontario
- Occupation: Canadian educator
- Known for: founded the Frontier College in 1899

Alfred Fitzpatrick (22 April 1862 – 16 June 1936) was born in Pictou County, Nova Scotia. He attended Pictou Academy. He founded Frontier College in 1899, the oldest adult education institution in Canada.

== Career ==
In 1899, Reverend Fitzpatrick began teaching labourers from lumber, mining, and railway camps out of a log cabin in Nairn, Ontario although he had no staff, some parish assistance, and little money. He founded the Frontier College in 1899 with his colleagues at Queen's University in Kingston, Ontario. Fitzpatrick developed the idea of the Labourer-Teacher who work alongside the labourers during the day and teaches them in the evenings.

In 1920, Reverend Alfred Fitzpatrick said, "Whenever and wherever people shall have occasion to congregate, then and there shall be the time, place and means of their education." The college's purpose was to teach frontiersmen how to read. He promoted education as a right for all. He challenged Canadian universities to recognize the balance of intellectual, spiritual and physical qualities every individual embodies, no matter their station in life. Alfred Fitzpatrick wrote books which argued for literacy and explained why new immigrants should receive language and cultural training. He objected to the conditions imposed on a transient, peripheral working class. He challenged Canadians, its universities and its government and businesses to take education and literacy to labourers, remote communities, ex-convicts, people with learning disabilities, and street people.

After World War II, the Frontier College began working with teens, children, and families in urban centers. It established literacy programs to promote reading among the young, in remote communities, ex-convicts, people with learning disabilities, and street people.

Frontier College continues to this day helping to combat illiteracy in Canada with program of basic literacy, secondary and university education. The organization, which celebrated its 100th anniversary in 1999, was founded on the principle of "literacy for all".

== Books ==
- Alfred Fitzpatrick, The Handbook for New Canadians to help new immigrants understand the culture and traditions of Canada
- Alfred Fitzpatrick, The University in Overalls: a Plea for Part-Time Study (Thompson Educational Publishing, English, 1920 reprinted in 1999)

== Honours ==
- Hon John Hamm, the Premier of Nova Scotia moved the adoption of the following resolution:

"Whereas in 1899 Pictou County native, Alfred Fitzpatrick, overcame discouragement from government and business to establish the Canadian Reading Camps Association; and Whereas under Alfred Fitzpatrick's leadership, this organization grew into what is today known as Frontier College, Canada's oldest adult education institution; and Whereas in its century of operation, Frontier College has helped educate countless thousands of Canadians in railway camps, lumber woods, city streets and Aboriginal communities; Therefore be it resolved that members of this House recognize the contribution made to education and adult literacy by Alfred Fitzpatrick - one of the great Canadians born and raised in Nova Scotia."

- UNESCO recognized the Frontier College's work internationally by awarding it the 1977 Literacy Prize for its "meritorious work in the field of adult education."

== Memorial ==
The Fitzpatrick Award, which honours the contribution to the cause of literacy by a group, organization, corporation, agency or family was named after Alfred Fitzpatrick.

== Histories ==
- Bruce, Lorne D., (Sep 24, 2014). "Reading Camps and Travelling Libraries in New Ontario, 1900–1905." Historical Studies in Education / Revue d’histoire de l’éducation.
- Cook, George, (1987) “Educational Justice for the Campmen: Alfred Fitzpatrick and the Foundation of Frontier College, 1899–1922,” in Michael Welton, ed., Knowledge for the People: The Struggle for Adult Learning in English Speaking Canada, 1828–1973 (Toronto: OISE Press, 1987), 35–51.
- James H. Morrison, From Alfred Fitzpatrick: Founder of Frontier College Four East Publications Ltd. ISBN 0-920427-45-6
- Alfred Fitzpatrick, The University in Overalls: A Plea for Part-Time Study Thompson Educational Publishing, English, 1920 reprinted in 1999
- James H. Morrison, The Right to Read: Social Justice, Literacy, and the Creation of Frontier College—The Alfred Fitzpatrick Story Nimbus Publishing ISBN 978-1-77471-130-9
