= Fred Longstaffe =

Canadian geologist

Frederick John Longstaffe CM, Ph.D., FRSC is the former Provost and vice-president (Academic) at The University of Western Ontario. He is an earth science researcher. His current focus is on applying knowledge of stable isotopes to various fields of study.

== Biography ==
Longstaffe earned a BSc (Hons) from the University of Windsor and a PhD in Geology from McMaster University. In 1978, he was a researcher at the University of Alberta as a Killam Post-Doctoral Scholar. After that he joined that university's Department of Geology faculty. In 1987, Longstaffe moved to the Western as a full professor in Geology and opened the Laboratory for Stable Isotope Science. The labs principal research areas are environmental geochemistry and clastic diagenesis, with special emphasis on the application of stable isotopes and other biogeochemical methods to studies of the environment and climate change. The Departments of Geology and Geophysics were merged in 1993. He became the chair of the newly formed Department of Earth Sciences. Dr. Longstaffe gave up that position in 1999 to take on the larger role of Dean of the Faculty of Science. In July 2005, Longstaffe became the university's Provost and VP Academic.

Longstaffe's research has attracted substantial funding from Natural Sciences and Engineering Research Council, Social Science and Humanities Research Council and Canada Foundation for Innovation. His current research focuses on the use of stable isotopes to study earth and environmental science, ecosystems, oil sands, and anthropology.

Longstaffe has served as president of the Geological Association of Canada. He has frequently served on Natural Sciences and Engineering Research Council and Royal Society of Canada committees.

He resides in Ilderton, Ontario.

== Awards ==
- 1993- Awarded Past President's Award by Geological Association of Canada for outstanding research by a younger scientist
- 1994- Named Distinguished Fellow of the Geological Association of Canada
- Between 1995 and 2005- Named to the University Students’ Council Teaching Honor Role six times
- 1997- Named Fellow of the Royal Society of Canada
- 1998- Awarded the Mineralogical Association of Canada‘s Past-President's Medal for Research
- 2003- Awarded Geological Association of Canada's highest honor, the Logan Medal
- 2022- Appointed to the Order of Canada.

== Select publications ==
- Bennett, P.J., Longstaffe, F.J. and Rowe, R.K. (2000) The stability of dolomite in landfill leachate collection systems. The Canadian Geotechnical Journal, v. 37, p. 371-378.
- Barriga, F.J.A.S., Mateus, A., Ribeiro, A., Fyfe, W.S. and Longstaffe, F.J. (1995) Metallogenetic potential of the Vilariça strike-slip fault at Quintela de Lampaças (Bragança, Portugal). In: IV Congresso Nacional de Geologia (Porto, Dexembro 95), Memória n°4, Univ. Porto - Fac. Ciências, Museu e Lab. Min. e Geol., F. Sodré Borges & M.M. Marques, eds., p. 527-532.
- de Caritat, P., Bloch, J., Hutcheon, I., Longstaffe, F.J. and Abercrombie, H.J. (1997) Comparison of the mineralogical and chemical composition of 2 shales from the western Canada sedimentary basin and the U.S. Gulf Coast. Clays and Clay Minerals, v.45, p. 327-332.
- Ensign, K.L., Webb, E.A. and Longstaffe F.J. (in press) Microenvironmental variations in soil-water content of the unsaturated zone of a sand dune system at Pinery Provincial Park. Submitted to Geoderma, January 2005, revised May 2006.
- Hornibrook, E.R.C., Longstaffe, F.J. and Fyfe, W.S. (2000) Factors influencing stable-isotope ratios in CH_{4} and CO_{2} within subenvironments of freshwater wetlands: implications for d-signatures of emissions. Isotopes in Environmental and Health Studies, v. 36, p. 151-176.
- Léveillé, R. J., Fyfe, W.S. and Longstaffe, F.J. (2000) Unusual secondary Ca-Mg carbonate-kerolite deposits in basaltic caves, Kauai, Hawaii. Journal of Geology, v. 108, p. 613-621.
- Longstaffe, F.J., Calvo, R., Ayalon, A. and Donaldson W.S. (2003) Stable isotope evidence for multiple fluid regimes during carbonate cementation of the Upper Tertiary Hazeva Formation, Dead Sea Graben, southern Israel. Journal of Geochemical Exploration 4114, p. 1-20.
- Longstaffe, F.J. (2000) Chapter 6. An introduction to stable oxygen and hydrogen isotopes and their use as fluid tracers in sedimentary systems. In: Fluids and Basin Evolution. Edited by T.K. Kyser. Mineralogical Association of Canada Short Course Series, v. 28, p. 115-162.
- McKay, J. and Longstaffe, F.J. (2003) Sulphur isotope geochemistry of pyrite from the Upper Cretaceous Marshybank Formation, Western Interior Basin. Sedimentary Geology, v. 157, p. 175-195.
- Owen, J.V., Longstaffe, F.J. and Greenough, J.D. (2003) Petrology of sapphirine granulite and associated sodic gneisses from the Indian Head Range, Newfoundland. Lithos, v. 68, p. 91-114.
- Rowe, R.K., Fleming, I.R., Rittman, B.R., Longstaffe, F.J., Cullimore, D.R., McIsaac, R., Bennet, P., Cooke, A.J., Armstrong, M.D. and VanGulck, J. (2000) Multidisciplinary study of clogging of leachate drains. Sixth Canadian Environmental engineering Specialty conference, London, Jun 2000, p. 57-65.
- Webb, E.A. and Longstaffe, F.J. (2002) Climatic influences on the oxygen isotopic composition of biogenic silica deposited in prairie grass. Geochimica et Cosmochimica Acta, v. 66, p. 1891-1904.
- Webb, E.A. and Longstaffe, F.J. (2000) The oxygen isotopic compositions of silica phytoliths and plant water in grasses: implications for the study of paleoclimate. Geochimica et Cosmochimica Acta, v. 64, p. 767-780.
- White, C.D., Longstaffe, F.J. and Law, K.R. (2001) Revisiting the Teotihuacan connection at Altun Ha: Oxygen-isotope analysis of Tomb F-8/1. Ancient Mesoamerica, p. 65-72.
- Ziegler, K. and Longstaffe, F.J. (2000) Clay mineral authigenesis along a mid-continental scale fluid-conduit in Paleozoic sedimentary rocks from southern Ontario, Canada. Clay Minerals, v. 35, p. 243-264.
