= United for Literacy =

- Founded: 1899 in Ontario, Canada
- Region served: Canada
- Website: www.unitedforliteracy.ca

United for Literacy (French: Littératie Ensemble) a Canadian literacy organization established in 1899 by Alfred Fitzpatrick. It was founded as the Reading Camp Association and was renamed Frontier College in 1919. In 2022, Frontier College changed its name to United for Literacy.

The organization's aim is to improve literacy levels in Canada by providing education to those who seek assistance with their learning and have been overlooked or left behind by the formal educational system. Frontier College runs a wide variety of English-language and French-language literacy programs for children, youth and adults in many places across Canada such as community centres, shelters, farms and prisons.

Since 1986, its national headquarters has been located at Gzowski House (named for the celebrated Canadian journalist, the late Peter Gzowski) at 35 Jackes Avenue in Toronto, Ontario. It has a strong, widespread presence in Ontario and Quebec, and maintains staff and regional offices in other parts of Canada. It also maintains a large volunteer tutor base utilizing programs located at many universities across Canada, which recruit university students to volunteer as tutors in its programs.

== History ==
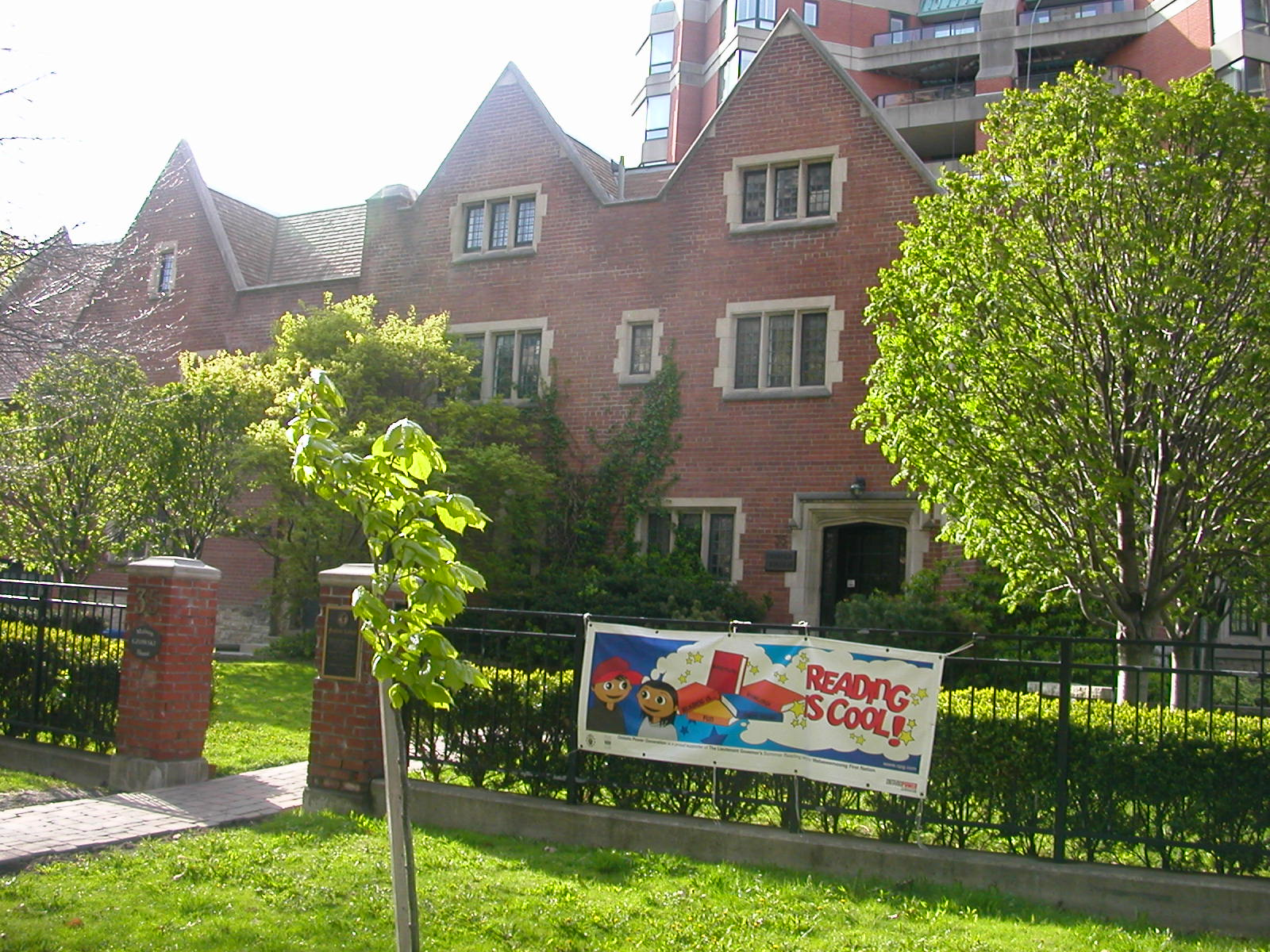
Gzowski House, the head office of United for Literacy in Toronto

In 1899, the Canadian Shield in northern Ontario was dotted with isolated lumber camps that were cut off from larger society. Alfred Fitzpatrick, a 37-year-old Nova Scotian, who was then a young minister of a Presbyterian Church at Nairn Centre (located west of Sudbury, Ontario), saw that many of the young men - who were largely new immigrants - who worked at these camps were denied the benefits of culture, education and enlightenment. Influenced by the notions of the Social Gospel movement and the teachings of Professor George Grant at his alma mater Queen's University, Fitzpatrick recognized that these men deserved "not charity but social justice." His prescription was straightforward: after securing the goodwill of the lumber magnates, he would go about from lumber camp to lumber camp, and in each he would erect large tents called "Reading Tents." Each tent was then outfitted with books and stationed by Labourer-Teachers who were university students recruited to volunteer at the tents to teach the workers to read and write. Outside each tent was a sign that said "Reading Tent. All Welcome." Thus, the Reading Tent Association was born. It was later renamed Frontier College.

Over the years, with the changing face of Canada and the nature of its society and industries, Frontier College too adapted its programs in order to meet the learning needs of Canadians everywhere. In 1932, Frontier College began serving in British Columbia 'relief camps'. The range of its programs grew from serving labourers in isolated logging and mining camps or rail gangs to assisting all constituents of Canadian society from adults working in factories and workshops to children from low-income families needing help with their homework, street-involved youth determined to overcome their circumstances, and Aboriginal learners and communities. In 2022, Frontier College changed its name to United for Literacy.

== Legacy ==
On 24 September 1999 Canada Post issued a stamp,'Frontier College, 1899–1999, Education for all,' based on a design by Renata Chubb, Glenda Rissman, and Peter D.K. Scott, based on an illustration by Alain Massicotte. The 46¢ stamps are perforated 13 x 13.5 and were printed by Canadian Bank Note Company, Limited.

== Educational Philosophy ==
True to its founding belief in universal rights to learning and education, United for Literacy adheres to the principle of S.C.I.L. or Student-Centred Individualized Learning (also known as Student-centred learning) in organizing its tutoring programs. This approach places the student or learner at the centre of the relationship where the learner, instead of the tutor/teacher, determines the goals or objectives that are to be achieved. In turn, the challenge is for the tutor/teacher to locate, organize or create and present learning material that is relevant to the student's/learner's goals, interests and experience. This relationship helps ensure that both learner and tutor are responsible partners in the learning-tutoring process.

== Programs ==
=== Labourer-Teachers ===
The Labourer-Teacher program is Frontier College's historical program. It began in 1902 and aimed to extend the rights to learning and education to labourers working in Canada's early mines, rail gangs and lumber camps, where the need was felt most sharply. Early Labourer-Teachers were mostly young men recruited from universities in Canada, who took up the challenge to work alongside the labourers by day and then teach them to read and write at night.

Founder Alfred Fitzpatrick captured the spirit of Frontier College with the following words:
"Whenever and wherever people shall have the occasion to congregate, then and there shall be the time, place and means of their education."

Canadian National Railway (CN) recruited as many as forty college students each year to serve as Labourer-Teachers while working as section hands. Each Laborer-Teacher was expected to work as hard as his track crew to "become one of the boys." After sounding out the crew to determine their interests, the Labourer-Teacher would hold evening classes when the work day was over. Depending upon the interests of the crew, classes might focus on spoken or written French or English, or such diverse subjects as mathematics, farming, or poetry. As many as three-thousand railway workers received instruction through the construction season, and the educational opportunity improved worker retention by providing a constructive activity to reduce mischief during the idle hours.

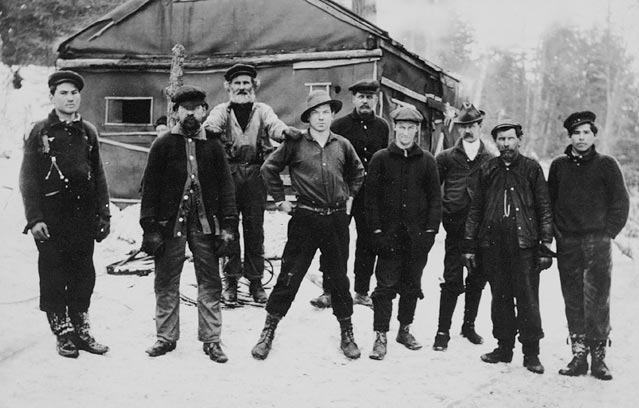
Frontier College Labourer Teacher Norman Bethune posing with some workers

With the Labourer-Teacher program firmly established, Frontier College Labourer-Teachers went on to work in pioneer settlements in Northern Ontario and relief camps during the 1930s. Labourer-Teachers helped construct the Alaska Highway during World War II and played a role in the technological transfer within Canada's workforce during the 1950s, 1960s and 1970s. More recently, Frontier College has sent Labourer-Teachers to work in penitentiaries and farming communities. Presently, Frontier College Labourer-Teachers work mainly with migrant workers from Mexico and the Caribbean who work on farms located in Southwestern Ontario.

Famous Frontier College Labourer-Teachers:

- The Hon.Roy McMurtry, retired Chief Justice of Ontario
- Dr. Norman Bethune, physician, medical innovator, humanitarian
- Dr. Margaret Strang, first female Labourer-Teacher
- Escott Reid, Canadian diplomat, author
- The Hon. David Peterson, 20th premier of Ontario
- The Hon. David Kilgour, former federal cabinet minister
- The Hon. Svend Robinson, former Member of Parliament

=== Indigenous communities ===
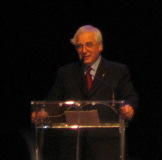
The Honourable James Bartleman speaking at the YPI–Leaders Today event at the Carlu in Toronto, Ontario

Frontier College began working with Indigenous communities in the 1960s, starting with a "community education program for the Inuit community in Frobisher Bay (now Iqaluit). In 2006, it began managing and operating the Aboriginal Summer Literacy Camps, one of four literacy initiatives spearheaded by The Hon. James Bartleman, the 27th Lieutenant Governor of Ontario, to support the development of literacy skills among First Nations children and youth living on isolated, fly-in only reserves in Northern Ontario.

A total of 36 camps were organized that year in 28 First Nations in the Nishnawbe Aski Nation and Grand Council of Treaty 3 territories. In 2007, it began a partnership with the Métis Nation of Ontario, and in 2008, extended the Summer Literacy Camps to other communities in Ontario, British Columbia, Alberta and Quebec. Since then, camps have also been delivered in New Brunswick First Nations communities.

=== Working with children and youth ===
United for Literacy works with community-based groups and organizations to set up programs for children. The programs vary from one region to another. The activities include Reading Circles, Tutoring (one-to-one, small group, and classroom helpers), Homework Clubs, and Summer Programs. Volunteers are recruited, screened and trained by the local United for Literacy staff.

=== Working with adults ===
United for Literacy trains volunteer tutors to help individuals (i.e. learners) to improve their learning skills in such areas as reading, writing, mathematics, and English as an Additional Language (i.e. ESL). The learners might include adults with disabilities, inmates in federal institutions, domestic workers, young adults, migrant workers, and immigrants to Canada.

== Awards ==
- The Companion of Frontier College honours the contributions of an individual.
- The Fitzpatrick Award, which honours the contribution to the cause of literacy by a group, organization, corporation, agency or family was named after the founder, Alfred Fitzpatrick.

== Honours ==
- The Honourable John Hamm, the Premier of Nova Scotia, moved the adoption of the following resolution:

"Whereas in 1899 Pictou County native, Alfred Fitzpatrick, overcame discouragement from government and business to establish the Canadian Reading Camps Association; and
Whereas under Alfred Fitzpatrick's leadership, this organization grew into what is today known as Frontier College, Canada's oldest adult education institution;
and Whereas in its century of operation, Frontier College has helped educate countless thousands of Canadians in railway camps, lumber woods, city streets and Aboriginal communities;
Therefore be it resolved that members of this House recognize the contribution made to education and adult literacy by Alfred Fitzpatrick - one of the great Canadians born and raised in Nova Scotia."

- UNESCO recognized the Frontier College's work internationally by awarding it the 1977 Literacy Prize (also known as The Mohammad Reza Pahlavi Prize) for its "meritorious work in the field of adult education."

== See also ==
- Heritage Minutes, which notes an episode on the Frontier College
