= Kurt Kyser =

American and Canadian geologist and geochemist

- Born: T. Kurtis Kyser; October 7, 1951; Montana, United States of America
- Died: August 29, 2017 (aged 65); Bermuda
- Education: PhD
- Alma mater: University of California, San Diego; University of California, Berkeley
- Known for: creating Queen’s Facility for Isotope Research
- Scientific career
- Fields: geochemistry, mineralogy
- Workplaces: University of Saskatchewan; Queen's University
- Thesis: Stable and rare gas isotopes and the genesis of basic lavas and mantle xenoliths (1980)

T. Kurtis (Kurt) Kyser (October 7, 1951, Montana, U.S. — August 29, 2017, Bermuda) was an American and Canadian geologist and geochemist, Fellow of the Royal Society of Canada, professor of the University of Saskatchewan and Queen's University, founder and director of the Queen's Facility for Isotope Research (QFIR). Kyser served as a president of the Mineralogical Association of Canada (between 2006 and 2008) and as an Editor-in-Chief of the journal Geochemistry: Exploration, Environment, Analysis (GEEA).

== Biography ==
Kurt Kyser was born in 1951 in Montana and grew up in San Diego, California. As a child, he was interested in entomology, but later he decided that geology is more fascinating for him. In 1974, Kyser graduated from the University of California, San Diego, then proceeding to postgraduate studies at the university branch in Berkeley, where he finished his MA studies in 1976, and PhD in Geology in 1980. His PhD became a pioneering work on the use of stable isotopes for the study of seafloor basalt.

After completing a post-doctoral fellowship at the United States Geological Survey in Denver and a NATO post-doctoral fellowship at the University of Paris, Kyser returned to the North America to work at the University of Saskatchewan (Canada) as an assistant professor; in 1989 he was made a full professor. In 1995 he joined the Department of Geological Sciences and Geological Engineering at Queen's University in Kingston. There, under the guidance of Kyser, the Queen's Facility for Isotope Research (QFIR) was established and became the leading geochemistry and isotope laboratory in North America. Kyser was strongly committed to developing the next generation of geochemists and supervised circa 50 MSc and as many PHD students in the field of geochemistry during his tenure as professor, including 26 MSc and 17 PhD theses just in the second decade of the 2000s. He published over 500 peer-reviewed papers, including book chapters, books and technical reports. The bulk of his research focused on application of isotopes, uranium in particular, to mineral exploration and environmental geochemistry, although he was influential on multiple other science disciplines.

Kurt Kyser was a member of the Mineralogical Association of Canada (where he served as president from 2006 to 2008), Mineralogical Society of America, American Geophysical Union, Geochemical Society of America and the Association of Applied Geochemists. During last years of his life he served as the Editor-in-Chief of the Geological Society of London's journal Geochemistry: Exploration, Environment, Analysis. He died while snorkeling, in August 2017 in Bermuda, where he was co-leading an annual field trip on carbonates. Kurt was survived by his wife, April Vuletich.

== Awards ==
Kurt Kyser was a Fellow of the Royal Society of Canada. His scientific achievements were recognized by professional awards from the Mineralogical Association of Canada (Past-Presidents Medal, 2001; Hawley Medal, 2002, 2021), Geological Association of Canada (Past President’s Medal; Duncan R. Derry Medal, 2017), Natural Sciences and Engineering Research Council (E.W.R. Steacie Memorial Fellowship), Canada Council for the Arts (Killam Research Fellowship) and the Royal Society of Canada (Willet G. Miller Medal).
