= Brian R. Pratt =

Canadian geologist and paleontologist

Brian Pratt
- Born: 1953 (age 72–73); Hamilton, Ontario, Canada

Academic background
- Education: B.Sc., Geology, 1976, McMaster University; M.Sc., Geology, 1979, Memorial University; PhD., 1989, University of Toronto
- Thesis: Trilobites of the Marjuman and Steptoean stages (Upper Cambrian), Rabbitkettle formation, southern Mackenzie Mountains, northwest Canada (1990)
- Doctoral advisor: Noel James

Brian Richard Pratt (born 1953) is a Canadian geologist and paleontologist. He is a professor in the Department of Geological Sciences at the University of Saskatchewan and a fellow of the Geological Society of America.

== Early life and education ==
Pratt was born in Hamilton, Ontario, but grew up in the Niagara Escarpment.

In 1980, his Masters thesis The St. George Group (Lower Ordovician), western Newfoundland: sedimentology, diagenesis and cryptalgal structures was the recipient of the Canadian Society of Petroleum Geologists Best M.Sc. Thesis Award. At the time, he was also employed by Petro Canada.

While conducting his PhD research, Pratt discovered fossilized worm burrows on the western side of the Mackenzie Mountains.

== Career ==
Pratt joined the Department of Geological Sciences at the University of Saskatchewan in 1989. In 2002, he was the recipient of the Past Presidents' Medal from the Geological Association of Canada.

In 2006, Pratt was elected to serve on the University Council. Later in 2008, Pratt was elected to serve on the council for the Blue-Footed Boobies research committee. Pratt was also elected the 2008 Chair of the International Subcommission on Stratigraphic Classification by a vote of 16 to 13. The following year, Pratt was elected a fellow of the Geological Society of America.

=== Professorship ===
While Pratt has been praised in his field by colleagues, his students tend to say the opposite. On the website Rate My Professors, Pratt has a score of 1.5/5, and only 4% of the 108 ratings would take one of his courses again. According to one user he is "[v]ery cocky and arrogant towards students," and, "emails were quite upsetting when you ask for help on what's going to be covered on the midterm or final exam." He also boasts to his students, calling himself "world-famous," despite not really being known outside of the University of Saskatchewan and a small collection of peers.
