= Swati Mia Saini =

American journalist

Mia Saini
- Born: Swati Maria Saini; Los Angeles
- Education: MIT HBS
- Occupation: Broadcast journalist

Swati Maria Saini, popularly known as Mia Saini, is an American financial journalist and video host who has also interned for CNBC and worked as a freelance reporter for TheStreet.com. She is currently a Hong Kong–based reporter for Bloomberg Television, having joined the network in June 2011, and covers business, economics, and global markets. As of December 2014, she was listed as a former reporter on the Bloomberg terminal system. Previously she was an anchor/reporter for Forbes Video Network, covering markets, business, economic and political news, and a video host for MBA Pod TV on www.MBAPodcaster.com

Prior to Harvard Business School she worked on the trading floor at Goldman Sachs and as a freelance TV reporter for Jim Cramer's website, TheStreet.com. She is an alumna of Massachusetts Institute of Technology (MIT) and has an MBA from Harvard Business School (HBS). Mia writes her own column "Money with Mia" for HBS's newspaper Harbus and has interviewed numerous CEOS and money managers including President of BlackRock, President of Lloyds, and Former Merrill Lynch CEO, John Thain. She also anchors HBS TV Market Minute with Mia Saini , now called H-Biz Tonight which features short daily reports from the financial markets

Mia has won numerous awards including being chosen as a Truman Scholar recipient, and as Glamour Magazine's Top 10 College Woman, winning the 1st place prize for community service. She is originally from Tracy, California.
