= Centennial College (Hong Kong) =

Private college in Hong Kong Island, Hong Kong

Coordinates: 22.252234°N 114.138283°E

- 明德學院
- Type: Private
- Established: 2012; 14 years ago
- Parent institution: University of Hong Kong
- President: William K M Lee (李經文教授)
- Academic staff: 23
- Undergraduates: 212
- Location: 3 Wah Lam Path, Pokfulam, Hong Kong
- Website: centennialcollege.hku.hk

Centennial College
- Traditional Chinese: 明德學院
Transcriptions
Yue: Cantonese
- Yale Romanization: Mìhng dāk hohk yuhn
- Jyutping: Ming^{4} dak^{1} hok^{6} yun^{6}

Centennial College (Chinese: 明德學院) is a private independent college in Pok Fu Lam, Hong Kong Island, Hong Kong. The college was established and funded by the University of Hong Kong School of Professional and Continuing Education as its second private subsidiary. The college was recognised as an Approved Post Secondary College under the Post Secondary Colleges Ordinance (Cap 320).

The School of Professional and Continuing Education at the University of Hong Kong is responsible for the personnel management, admissions and financial affairs of Centennial College. Due to the chronic shortage of student enrollment, the college has fallen into financial difficulties and will stop enrolling students from September 2019. The school originally planned to cease operations in the 2021/22 academic year, but later decided to merge with the Community College of the School of Professional and Continuing Education at the University of Hong Kong.

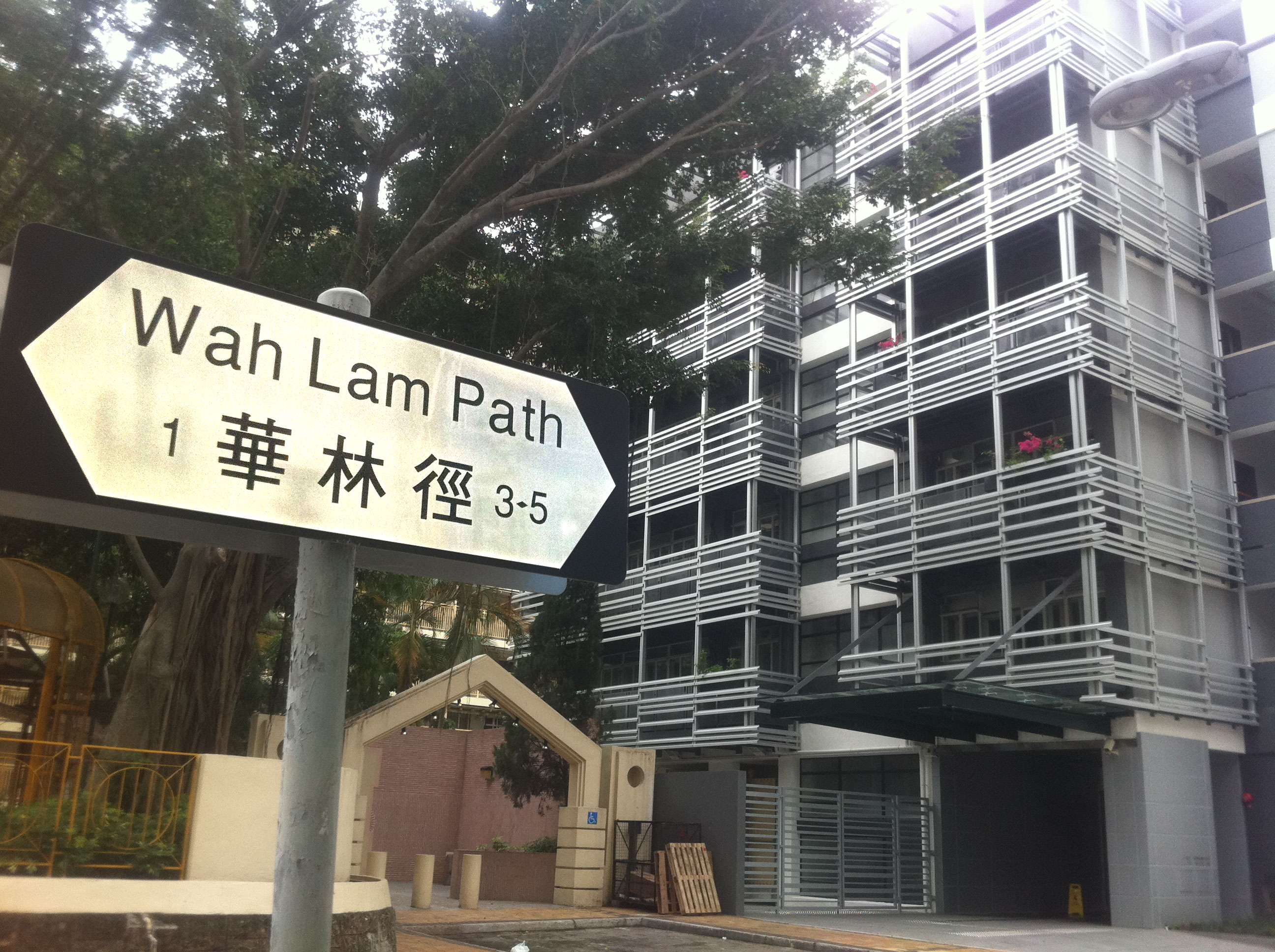
Wah Lam Path sign with college building in the background.
