= Mackay Memorial Hospital =

Hospital in Zhongshan, Taipei, Taiwan

Mackay Memorial Hospital 馬偕紀念醫院
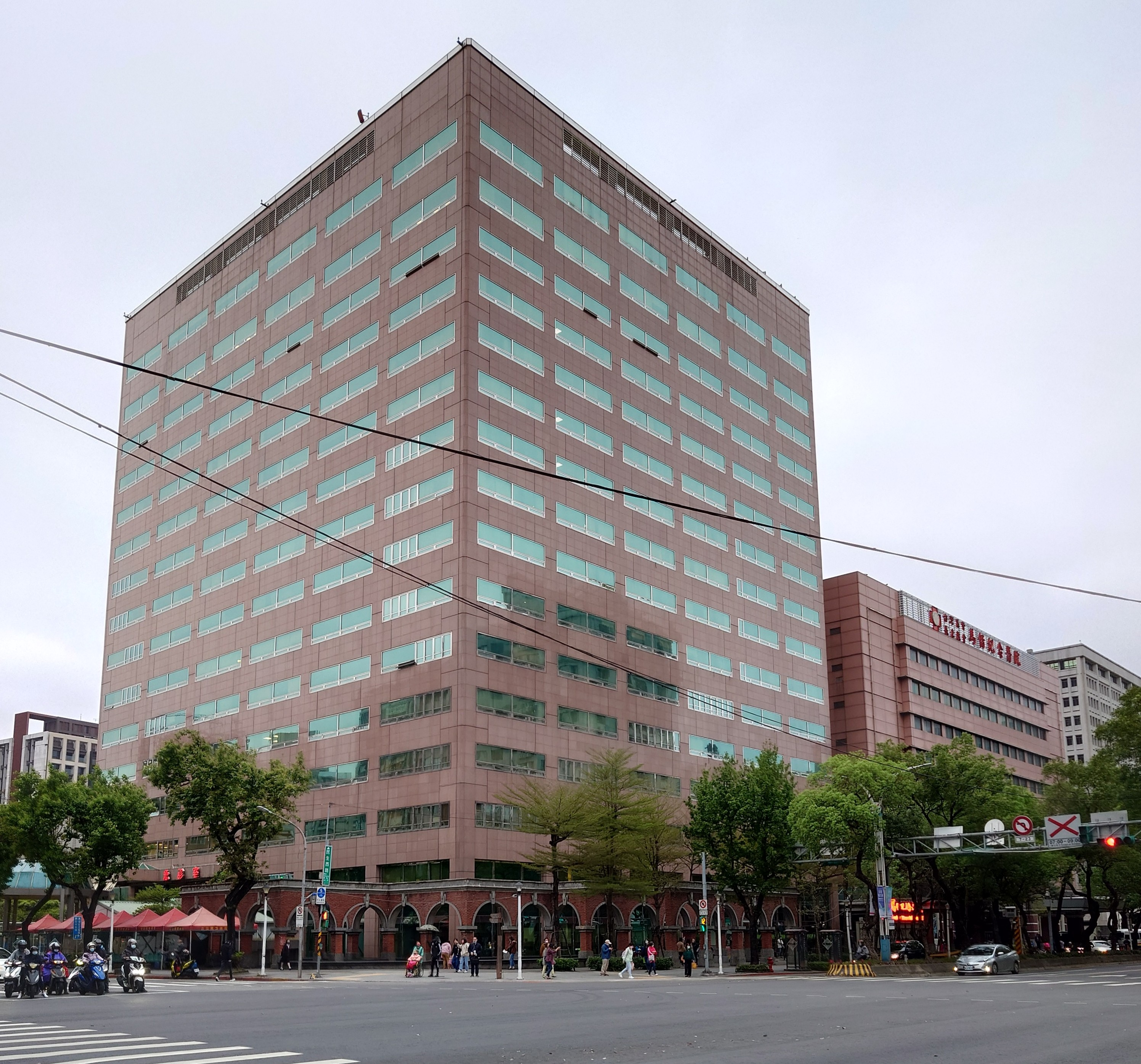

Geography
- Location: Zhongshan, Taipei, Taiwan
- Coordinates: 25.058737°N 121.522371°E

Organisation
- Type: District General, Teaching
- Religious affiliation: Presbyterian Church Taiwan
- Affiliated university: Presbyterian Church in Taiwan
- Patron: George Leslie Mackay

Services
- Beds: 1,200 (Taipei Main Hospital)

History
- Founded: 1880

Links
- Website: mmh.org.tw
- Lists: Hospitals in Taiwan

Mackay Memorial Hospital (Chinese: 馬偕紀念醫院; Pe̍h-ōe-jī: Má-Kai Chòng-Ha̍p Pēⁿ-Īⁿ; pinyin: Mǎjiē Jìniàn Yīyuàn; Wade–Giles: Ma³-Chieh¹ Tsung⁴-Ho² Yi¹-yüan⁴), established on 26 December 1912, is one of the largest medical centers in Taiwan. It is a private Christian hospital in Zhongshan District, Taipei, Taiwan, mostly associated with George Leslie Mackay, the first modern missionary to northern Taiwan. The hospital is deeply rooted in the Presbyterian tradition and under the spiritual guidance of the Presbyterian Church in Taiwan.

== History ==
The original Mackay Hospital — named Mackay Clinic — was built by Mackay in Tamsui in 1880 and named to commemorate George Leslie Mackay, whose widow donated the funds. At that time, the Mackay Clinic was the first western medical institution in northern Taiwan. It was temporarily closed in 1901 at the death of Mackay.

Mackay Hospital was reopened in 1906. In 1912, it was relocated from Tamsui to Taipei and renamed Mackay Memorial Hospital. Its logo bears the date of the original foundation: 1880.

Clarence Holleman ran the financially struggling hospital from 1957 to 1960, and during his tenure, corresponded with Samuel Noordhoff, who became Holleman's successor. In 1967, the hospital built the first intensive care unit in Taiwan. Chang Chin-wen, a colleague of Noordhoff's, derived the term's Chinese translation. Two years later, Mackay Memorial Hospital began offering services as the first suicide prevention center in Southeast Asia. Chang, who had watched The Slender Thread, advocated for a suicide hotline as well, which became operational in July 1969. Nordhoff later sent Chang to study medical management in the United States, while Nordhoff himself returned to the US to be trained in cleft lip and palate surgery. After their return to Taiwan, Mackay Memorial Hospital built the first specialized cleft lip and palate center in Taiwan. In 1994, it established the first demonstration burn ward in Taiwan. In 2025, the hospital was a victim of a Chinese hacker who exfiltrated over 16 million patient records.

== Notable births ==
- Tsai Ing-wen, President of Taiwan

== See also ==
- Healthcare in Taiwan
