= Gunningite =

Mineral in the Kieserite group

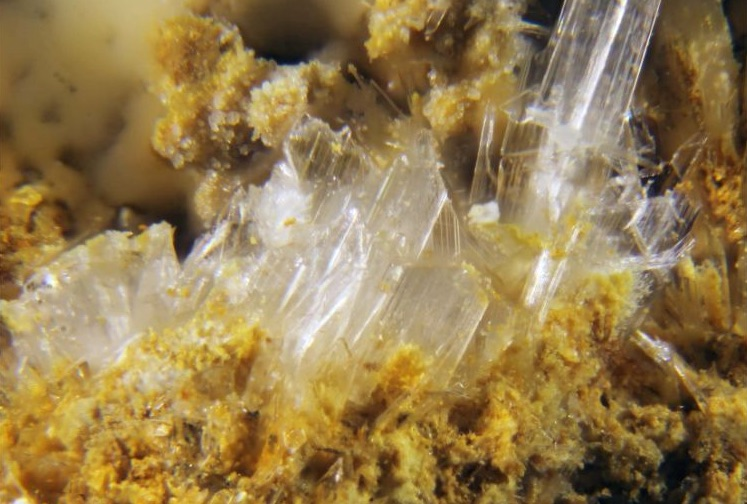
- Gunningite

General
- Category: Sulfate minerals
- Formula: (Zn,Mn^{2+})SO_{4}·H_{2}O
- IMA symbol: Gun
- Strunz classification: 7.CB.05
- Dana classification: 29.6.2.5
- Crystal system: Monoclinic
- Crystal class: Prismatic (2/m) (same H-M symbol)
- Space group: C2/c

Identification
- Color: White to colorless
- Cleavage: Indistinct
- Mohs scale hardness: 2.5
- Luster: Vitreous
- Diaphaneity: Translucent
- Specific gravity: 3.195
- Optical properties: Biaxial (+)
- Refractive index: nα = 1.570 nβ = 1.576 nγ = 1.630

Gunningite is one of the minerals in the Kieserite group, with the chemical formula (Zn,Mn^{2+})SO_{4}·H_{2}O. Its name honours Henry Cecil Gunning (1901–1991) of the Geological Survey of Canada and a professor at the University of British Columbia.

== Occurrence ==
Gunningite is rare. It is found in dry areas of the oxidized portions of sphalerite-bearing deposits. It has been noted in mines in Canada (Yukon Territory, British Columbia and New Brunswick), the United States (Nevada and Arizona), Switzerland (Valais), Greece (Attica) and Germany (Baden-Württemberg).

== See also ==
- List of minerals
- List of minerals named after people
