= Barlow Memorial Medal =

Canadian award in economic geology

The Barlow Memorial Medal was created in 1916 by the Canadian Institute of Mining, Metallurgy and Petroleum to recognize the best paper on economic geology published by the institute each year.

Initially a cash prize, the award then became a silver medal (supplemented by a cash prize), upgrading in 1941 to a gold medal. It may be awarded to one or more authors in a given year, including teams. Winners are typically announced at the CIM Awards Gala or related conference events.

The medal is named after Alfred Ernest Barlow, who served as President of the Institute between 1912 and 1919.

== Recent Prizewinners ==
Source:(2006-) Canadian Institute of Mining, Metallurgy and Petroleum
Source (1926-2000): Literary Awards

- 2025: W. T. Fischer; D. D. Marshall; J. Miller-Tait
- 2024: George Simandl; Suzanne Paradis; Laura Simandl
- 2021: Chris Rees; Greg Gillstrom; K. Brock Riedell
- 2019: Alexander Prikhodko; Hamid Mumin
- 2017: Malcolm Thurston
- 2015: Christine L. McKechnie; Irvine R. Annesley; Kevin M. Ansdell
- 2014: Jim Oliver
- 2013: Olivier Rabeau
- 2012: Li Zhen Cheng
- 2011: Michael D. Doggett; Richard A. Leveille
- 2010: David R. Lentz; Donald Hoy; Kathleen G. Thorne; Les R. Fyffe; Louis J. Cabri
- 2005: Greg A. Shore
- 2000: no winner
- 1999: no winner
- 1998: D.H. Rousell; H.L. Gibson; I.R. Jonasson
- 1987: D.G. Sheehan; C. F. Gleeson
- 1949: Theodore August Link; Clarence O. Swanson
- 1948: Arthur B. Yates
- 1947: Neil Campbell
- 1946: Stanley Davidson
- 1945: Victor Dolmage; C. E. Gordon Brown
- 1944: C. H. Stockwell
- 1943: John D. Bateman
- 1942: no winner
- 1941: Paul Billingsley; Chamberlain B. Hume
- 1940: Harold Hopkins
- 1939: J.E. Gill
- 1938: Courtney E. Cleveland; Staff of Pioneer Mines
- 1937: H.C. Gunning
- 1936: W.T. Robson
- 1935: G.M. Brownell; A.R. Kinkel, Jr.
- 1934: Peter Prie
- 1933: L. Telfer
- 1932: J.E. Hawley
- 1931: A.K. Snelgrove
- 1930: B.R. Mackay
- 1929: V. Corless
- 1928: no winner
- 1927: F.W. Gray
- 1926: G.S. Hume

== See also ==
- List of geology awards
