= Glacial motion =

Geological phenomenon

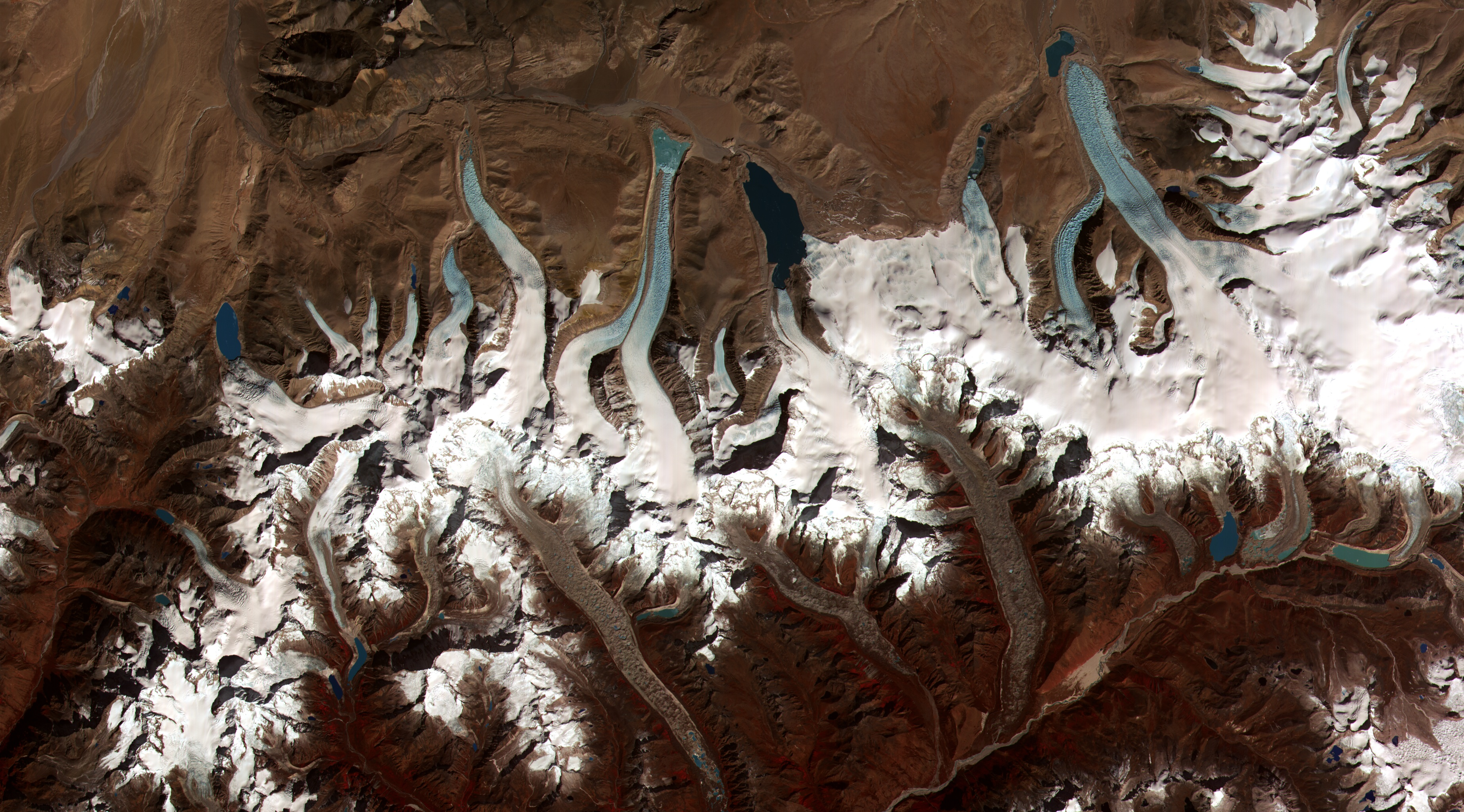
Termini of the glaciers in the Bhutan-Himalaya. Glacial lakes have been rapidly forming on the surface of the debris-covered glaciers in this region during the last few decades. USGS researchers have found a strong correlation between increasing temperatures and glacial retreat in this region.

Glacial motion is the motion of glaciers, which can be likened to rivers of ice. It has played an important role in sculpting many landscapes. Most lakes in the world occupy basins scoured out by glaciers. Glacial motion can be fast (up to 30 metres per day (98 ft/d), observed on Jakobshavn Isbræ in Greenland) or slow (0.5 metres per year (20 in/year) on small glaciers or in the center of ice sheets), but is typically around 25 centimetres per day (9.8 in/d).

== Processes of motion ==
Glacier motion occurs from four processes, all driven by gravity: basal sliding, glacial quakes generating fractional movements of large sections of ice, bed deformation, and internal deformation.

- In the case of basal sliding, the entire glacier slides over its bed. This type of motion is enhanced if the bed is soft sediment, if the glacier bed is thawed and if meltwater is prevalent.
- Bed deformation is thus usually limited to areas of sliding. Seasonal melt ponding and penetrating under glaciers shows seasonal acceleration and deceleration of ice flows affecting whole icesheets.
- Some glaciers experience glacial quakes—glaciers "as large as Manhattan and as tall as the Empire State Building, can move 10 meters in less than a minute, a jolt that is sufficient to generate moderate seismic waves." There has been an increasing pattern of these ice quakes - "Quakes ranged from six to 15 per year from 1993 to 2002, then jumped to 20 in 2003, 23 in 2004, and 32 in the first 10 months of 2005." A glacier that is frozen up to its bed does not experience basal sliding.
- Internal deformation occurs when the weight of the ice causes the deformation of ice crystals. This takes place most readily near the glacier bed, where pressures are highest. There are glaciers that primarily move via sliding, glacial quakes, and others that move almost entirely through deformation.

== Governing physical principles ==
Glaciers move and flow downslope due to either deformation or sliding. The flow of material through a glacier is generally not constant at various points within the glacier itself, but is rather faster or slower depending on a plethora of contributing factors. One way to describe these factors is by describing their impact on glacier stresses. One may distinguish between two kinds of stresses: driving stresses (for which gravity causes the glacier to flow downslope) or resistive stresses (which prevent the glacier's downslope acceleration).

Stress is a vector quantity with units of force per unit area. It is a useful quantity for describing glacial movement because the efficacy of a force (such as gravity or friction) is emphasized or weakened depending on the area over which it is distributed. For the purposes of describing glacial motion, we can classify all stresses as either (a) normal stresses which act perpendicular to a surface of interest or (b) shear stresses which act transversely to a surface of interest.

Glacial ice experiences a driving stress due to basal shear stresses, which are shear stresses on the glacial bed. For a basic model of basal shear stress, we may say that:

$\tau = \rho g h \sin(\alpha)$

Where α is the slope of the glacial bed, ρ is the ice density, g is the acceleration of gravity, and h is the ice thickness. Also note that:

$\sigma = \rho g h$

Where sigma is the normal stress experienced by the glacial bed due to the weight of the glacial ice. (Note that the expression ρgh is equivalent to the expression for hydrostatic pressure, i.e. the static stress exerted on some point under the weight of a fluid column). As such, the shear stress is simply the downslope component of the glacial ice's weight. It is thus evident that the stress state of the glacier is not constant through the thickness of the glacier, because the normal stress increases closer to the glacial bed due to higher weight being carried on lower layers (indeed the stress varies ~linearly with depth). Regardless, under this driving shear stress, the glacial ice will deform, experiencing non-linear viscous flow. The relationship for the amount of deformation and driving shear stress can be modeled using the Glen-Nye Flow Law which is a constitutive law to describe the rheology of glacial ice and states that:

$\dot{\epsilon}_{e} = A\tau^{n}_e$

In essence, the rate of strain (deformation per unit length of the glacier) is proportional to a constant A times the basal shear stress to the power of n, another constant. Typically,

$A \approx 2.4\cdot 10^{-24} Pa^{-3}s^{-1}$ and $n \approx 3$.

Note that constants A and n are based on empirical observations of ice movement, and not derived from physical laws. Most studies indicate that the power law value of n should be between 2 and 4.

This flow law can also be expressed in tensorial form as $\tau_{ij} = 2\eta\dot{\epsilon_{ij}}$ where $\eta = \frac{1}{2A\tau^{n-1}}$ and referred to as the effective viscosity of the ice. In this expression, $\tau_{ij}$ represents the deviatoric stress tensor experienced by the ice. Deviatoric stress is the component of stress that results in material distortion rather than bulk volume change (which is represented by the hydrostatic stress component). Thus, we see that the flow of ice and glacial rheology are highly sensitive to shear stresses within the ice. However, as previously noted, shear stress is dependent upon the hydrostatic pressure experienced by the ice bed.

In addition to the deformation of the glacier, there is also Basal sliding, which is movement/sliding of the glacier relative to the rock bed that it sits on. Glacier flow velocity is the sum of deformation and basal sliding. Basal resistance describes the work done to reduce glacier flow due to slip of the glacier along the rock bed, and depends on many factors such as qualities of the rock bed (sediment deformability/hardness). Meltwater between the rock bed and glacier often arises due to either high normal pressure melting ice close to the bed or water that has traveled through glacial cracks. This meltwater lubricates the interface between the glacier and the rock bed, increasing rates of basal sliding. The proortion of glacial motion that may be attributed due to deformation versus basal sliding depends on the glacier's environment. For example, the movement of glaciers on cold steep slopes may be mostly attributed to basal sliding, but in warmer and flatter environments, basal sliding may only contribute to 10-20% of glacial movement.

== Terminus movement and mass balance ==
If a glacier's terminus moves forward faster than it melts, the net result is advance. Glacier retreat occurs when more material ablates from the terminus than is replenished by flow into that region.

Glaciologists consider that trends in mass balance for glaciers are more fundamental than the advance or retreat of the termini of individual glaciers. In the years since 1960, there has been a striking decline in the overall volume of glaciers worldwide. This decline is correlated with global warming. As a glacier thins, due to the loss of mass it will slow down and crevassing will decrease.

== Landscape and geology ==
Studying glacial motion and the landforms that result requires tools from many different disciplines: physical geography, climatology, and geology are among the areas sometime grouped together and called earth science.

During the Pleistocene (the last ice age), huge sheets of ice called continental glaciers advanced over much of the earth. The movement of these continental glaciers created many now-familiar glacial landforms. As the glaciers were expanded, due to their accumulating weight of snow and ice, they crushed and redistributed surface rocks, creating erosional landforms such as striations, cirques, and hanging valleys. Later, when the glaciers retreated leaving behind their freight of crushed rock and sand, depositional landforms were created, such as moraines, eskers, drumlins, and kames. The stone walls found in New England (northeastern United States) contain many glacial erratics, rocks that were dragged by a glacier many miles from their bedrock origin.

At some point, if an Alpine glacier becomes too thin it will stop moving. This will result in the end of any basal erosion. The stream issuing from the glacier will then become clearer as glacial flour diminishes. Lakes and ponds can also be caused by glacial movement. Kettle lakes form when a retreating glacier leaves behind an underground chunk of ice. Moraine-dammed lakes occur when a stream (or snow runoff) is dammed by glacial till.

== See also ==
- Cryoseism
- Glacial earthquake
- Glacial lake outburst flood
