= Glacier =

Persistent body of ice that moves downhill under its own weight

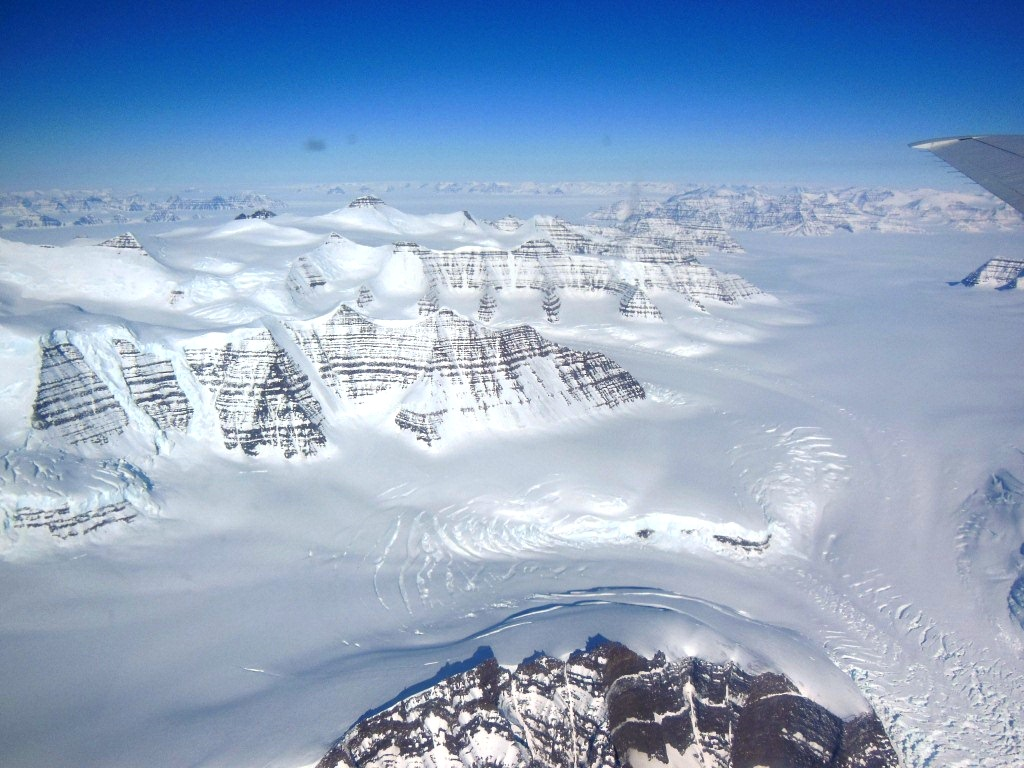
Glacier of the Geikie Plateau in Greenland

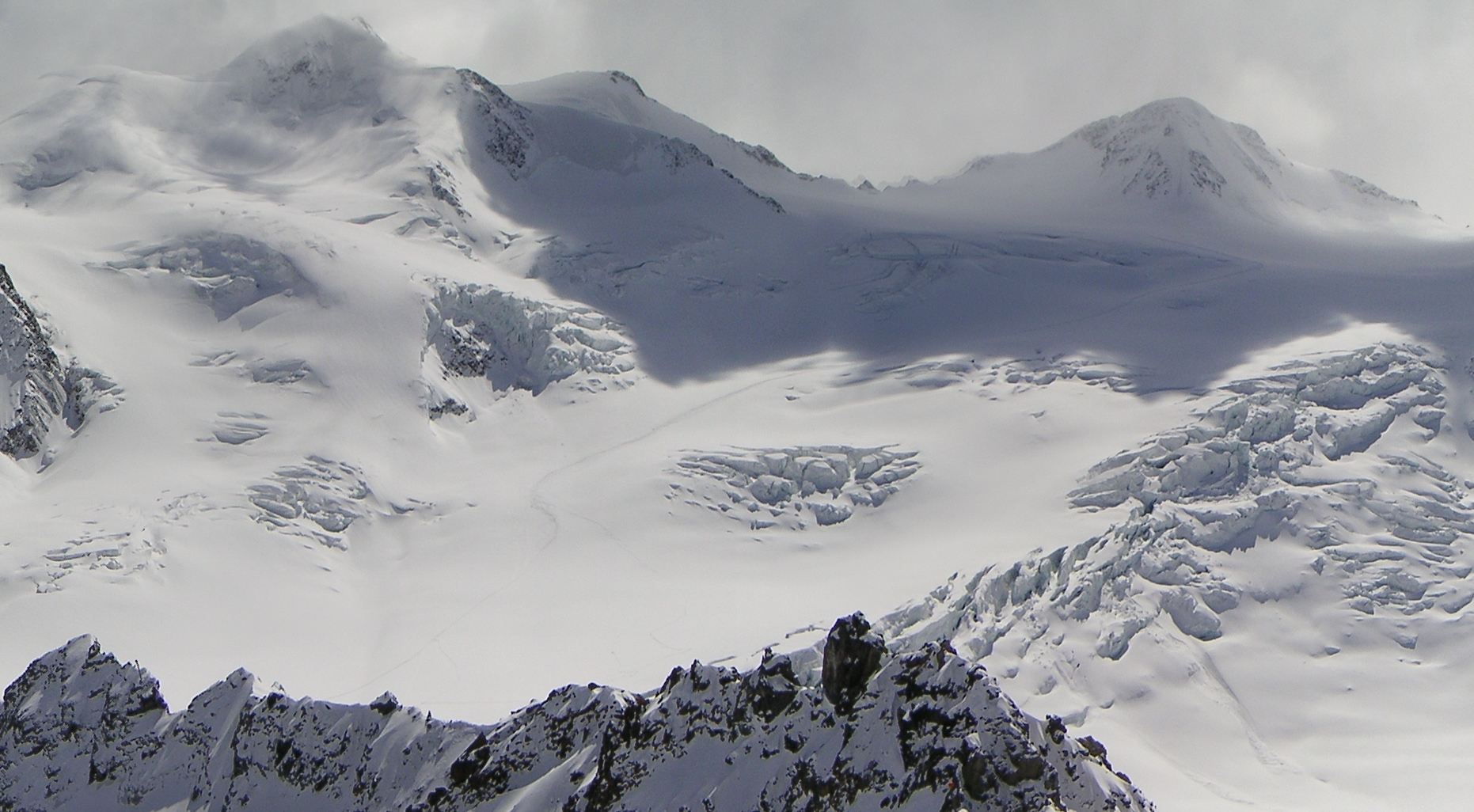
The Taschachferner in the Ötztal Alps in Austria. The mountain to the left is the Wildspitze (3,768 m), the second highest in Austria

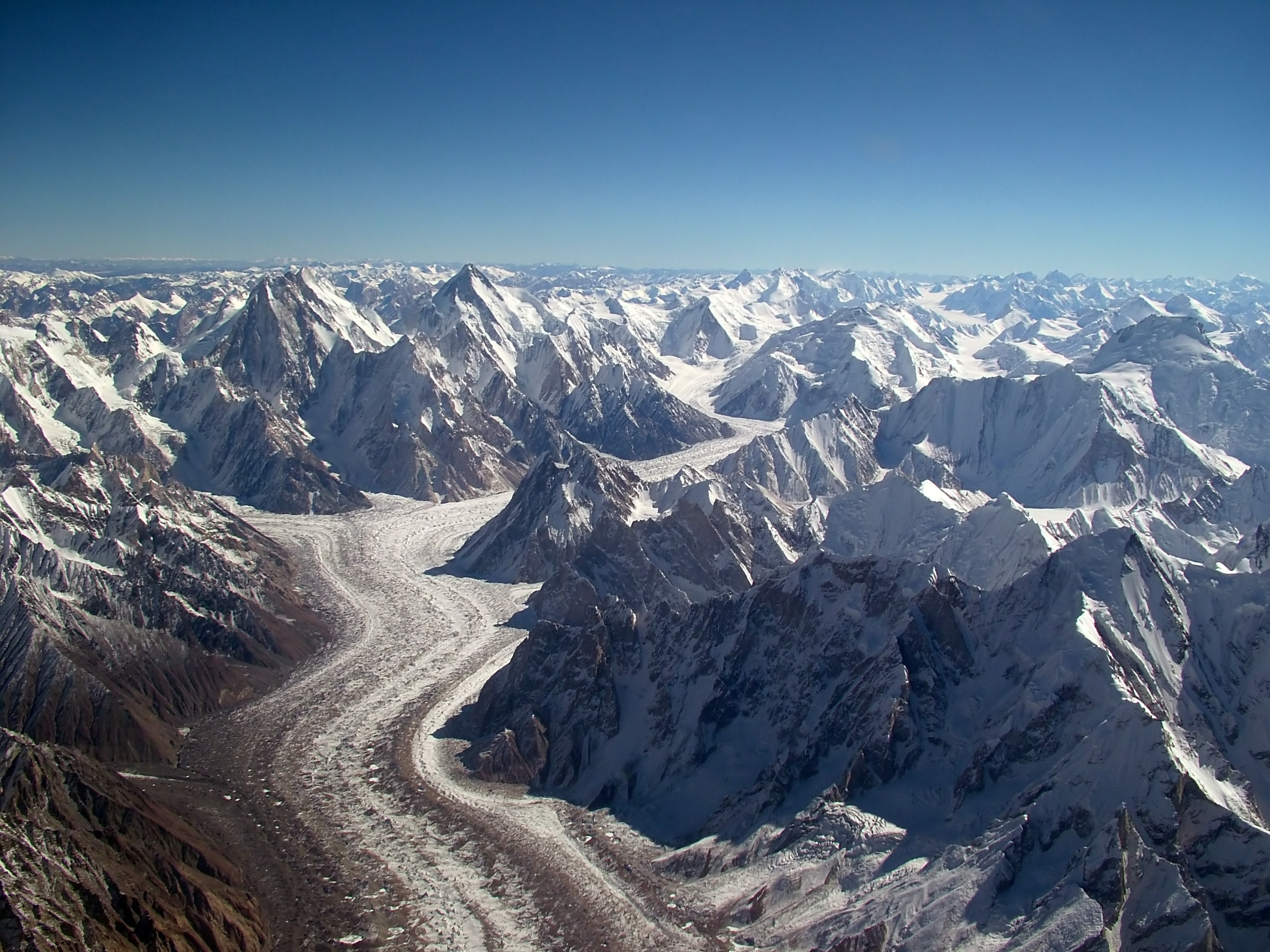
The Baltoro Glacier in Pakistan. It is 62 kilometres (39 mi) long, the fifth longest alpine glacier in the world.

A glacier (US: /ˈɡleɪʃər/; UK: /ˈɡlæsiə/ or /ˈɡleɪsiə/) is a persistent body of natural ice, a form of rock, that is constantly moving under its own weight. A glacier forms where the accumulation of snow exceeds its ablation over many years, often centuries. It slowly flows and deforms under stresses induced by gravity, undergoing both ductile and brittle deformation, and acquiring distinguishing surface features, such as crevasses and seracs. As a glacier moves, it abrades underlying rock and debris to create glacial landforms, such as cirques, moraines, and fjords. Although a glacier may flow into a body of water, and can include ice shelves and ice tongues, it originates only on land and is distinct from the much thinner sea ice and lake ice that form on the surface of freezing bodies of water.

On Earth, 99% of glacial ice is contained within vast ice sheets (also known as "continental glaciers") in the polar regions, but glaciers may be found in mountain ranges on every continent other than the Australian mainland, including Oceania's high-latitude oceanic island countries such as New Zealand. Between latitudes 35°N and 35°S, glaciers occur only in the Himalayas, Andes, and a few high mountains in East Africa, Mexico, New Guinea and on Zard-Kuh in Iran. With more than 7,000 known glaciers, Pakistan has more glacial ice than any other country outside the polar regions. Glaciers cover about 10% of Earth's land surface. Continental glaciers cover nearly 13 million km^{2} (5 million sq mi) or about 98% of Antarctica's 13.2 million km^{2} (5.1 million sq mi), with an average thickness of ice 2,100 m (7,000 ft). Greenland and Patagonia also have huge expanses of continental glaciers. The volume of glaciers, not including the ice sheets of Antarctica and Greenland, has been estimated at 170,000 km^{3}.

Glacial ice is the largest reservoir of fresh water on Earth, holding with ice sheets about 69% of the world's freshwater. Many glaciers from temperate, alpine and seasonal polar climates store water as ice during the colder seasons and release it later in the form of meltwater as warmer summer temperatures cause the glaciers to melt, creating a water source that is especially important for plants, animals and human uses when other sources may be scant. However, within high-altitude and Antarctic environments, the seasonal temperature difference is often not sufficient to release meltwater.

Since glacial mass is affected by long-term climatic changes, e.g., precipitation, mean temperature, and cloud cover, glacial mass changes are considered among the most sensitive indicators of climate change and are a major source of variations in sea level.

A large piece of compressed ice, or a glacier, appears blue, as large quantities of water appear blue, because water molecules absorb other colors more efficiently than blue. The other reason for the blue color of glaciers is the lack of air bubbles. Air bubbles, which give a white color to ice, are squeezed out by pressure increasing the created ice's density.

== Etymology and terminology ==
The word glacier is a loanword from French and goes back, via Franco-Provençal, to the Vulgar Latin glaciārium, derived from the Late Latin glacia, and ultimately Latin glaciēs, meaning "ice". Processes and features caused by or related to glaciers are described as glacial. The process of glacier establishment, growth and flow is called glaciation. The corresponding area of study is called glaciology. Glaciers are important components of the global cryosphere.

== Types ==
=== Classification by size, shape and behavior ===
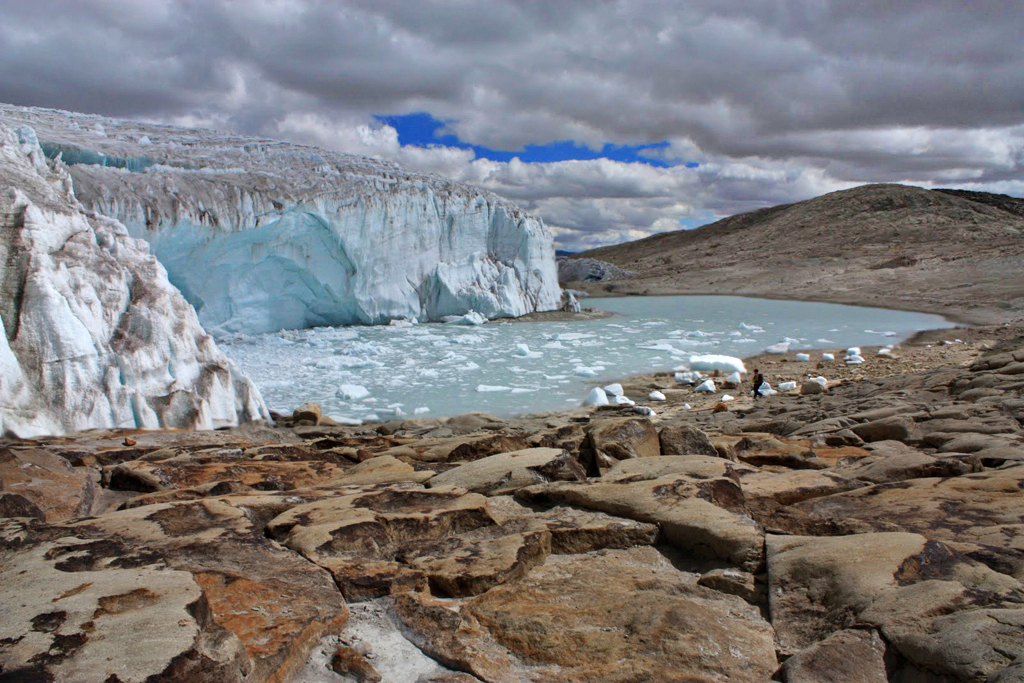
The Quelccaya Ice Cap in Peru is the second-largest glaciated area in the tropics

Glaciers are categorized by their morphology, thermal characteristics, and behavior. Alpine glaciers form on the crests and slopes of mountains. A glacier that fills a valley is called a valley glacier, or alternatively, an alpine glacier or mountain glacier. A large body of glacial ice astride a mountain, mountain range, or volcano is termed an ice cap or ice field. Ice caps have an area less than 50,000 km^{2} (19,000 sq mi) by definition.

Glacial bodies larger than 50,000 km^{2} (19,000 sq mi) are called ice sheets or continental glaciers. Several kilometers deep, they obscure the underlying topography. Only nunataks protrude from their surfaces. The only extant ice sheets are the two that cover most of Antarctica and Greenland. They contain vast quantities of freshwater, enough that if both melted, global sea levels would rise by over 70 m (230 ft). Portions of an ice sheet or cap that extend into water are called ice shelves; they tend to be thin with limited slopes and reduced velocities. Narrow, fast-moving sections of an ice sheet are called ice streams. In Antarctica, many ice streams drain into large ice shelves. Some drain directly into the sea, often with an ice tongue, like Mertz Glacier.

Tidewater glaciers are glaciers that terminate in the sea, including most glaciers flowing from Greenland, Antarctica, Baffin, Devon, and Ellesmere Islands in Canada, Southeast Alaska, and the Northern and Southern Patagonian Ice Fields. As the ice reaches the sea, pieces break off or calve, forming icebergs. Most tidewater glaciers calve above sea level, which often results in a tremendous impact as the iceberg strikes the water. Tidewater glaciers undergo centuries-long cycles of advance and retreat that are much less affected by climate change than other glaciers.

=== Classification by thermal state ===
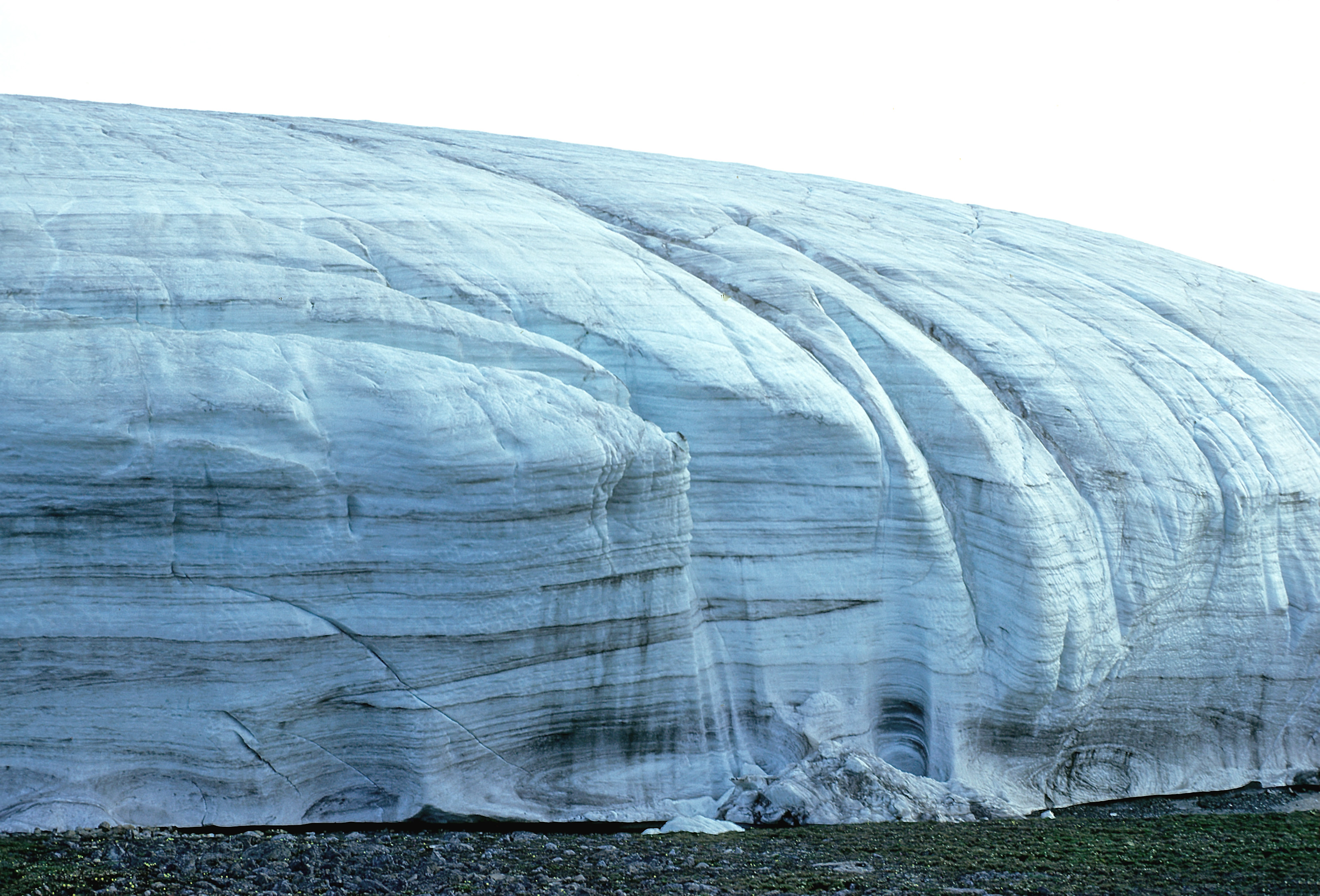
Webber Glacier on Grant Land is an advancing polar glacier

Thermally, a temperate glacier is at a melting point throughout the year, from its surface to its base. The ice of a polar glacier is always below the freezing threshold from the surface to its base, although the surface snowpack may experience seasonal melting. A subpolar glacier includes both temperate and polar ice, depending on the depth beneath the surface and position along the length of the glacier. In a similar way, the thermal regime of a glacier is often described by its basal temperature. A cold-based glacier is below freezing at the ice-ground interface and is thus frozen to the underlying substrate. A warm-based glacier is above or at freezing at the interface and is able to slide at this contact. This contrast is thought to a large extent to govern the ability of a glacier to effectively erode its bed, as sliding ice promotes plucking at rock from the surface below. Glaciers which are partly cold-based and partly warm-based are known as polythermal.

== Formation ==
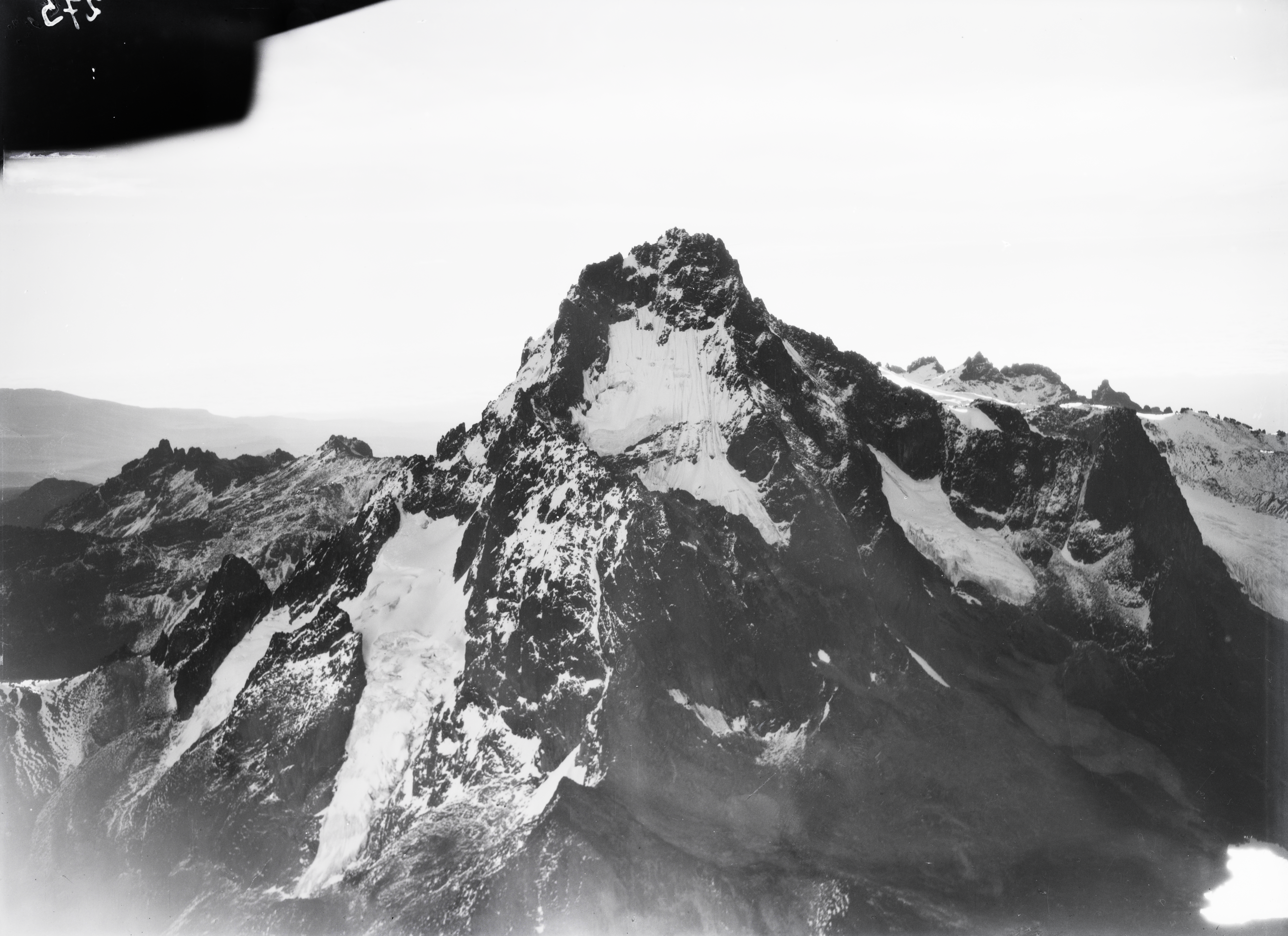
East-looking aerial view of Mt. Kenya, a glaciated high-altitude peak in tropical East Africa, May 1930. Glaciers form wherever persistent snowfall can accumulate into a mass large enough to compact into ice and flow under its own weight. Mt. Kenya's glaciers have been retreating since the 19th century, and the summit no longer receives enough persistent snowfall to sustain them.

Glaciers form where the accumulation of snow and ice exceeds ablation. A glacier usually originates from a cirque landform (alternatively known as a corrie or as a cwm) – a typically armchair-shaped geological feature (such as a depression between mountains enclosed by arêtes) – which collects and compresses through gravity the snow that falls into it. This snow accumulates and refreezes, turning into névé (granular snow). Further crushing of the individual snowflakes and expelling the air from the snow turns it into firn and eventually "glacial ice". This glacial ice will fill the cirque until it "overflows" through a geological weakness or vacancy from the edge of the cirque called the "lip" or threshold. When the mass of snow and ice reaches sufficient thickness, it begins to move by a combination of surface slope, gravity, and pressure. On steeper slopes, this can occur with as little as 15 m (49 ft) of snow-ice.

In temperate glaciers, snow repeatedly freezes and thaws, changing into granular ice or névé. Under the pressure of the layers of ice and snow above it, this granular snow fuses into denser firn. Over a period of years, layers of firn undergo further compaction and become glacial ice. Glacier ice is slightly more dense than ice formed from frozen water because glacier ice contains fewer trapped air bubbles.

== Color ==
Glacial ice has a distinctive blue tint because it absorbs some red light due to an overtone of the infrared OH stretching mode of the water molecule. Liquid water appears blue for the same reason. The blue of glacier ice is sometimes misattributed to Rayleigh scattering of bubbles in the ice.

== Structure ==
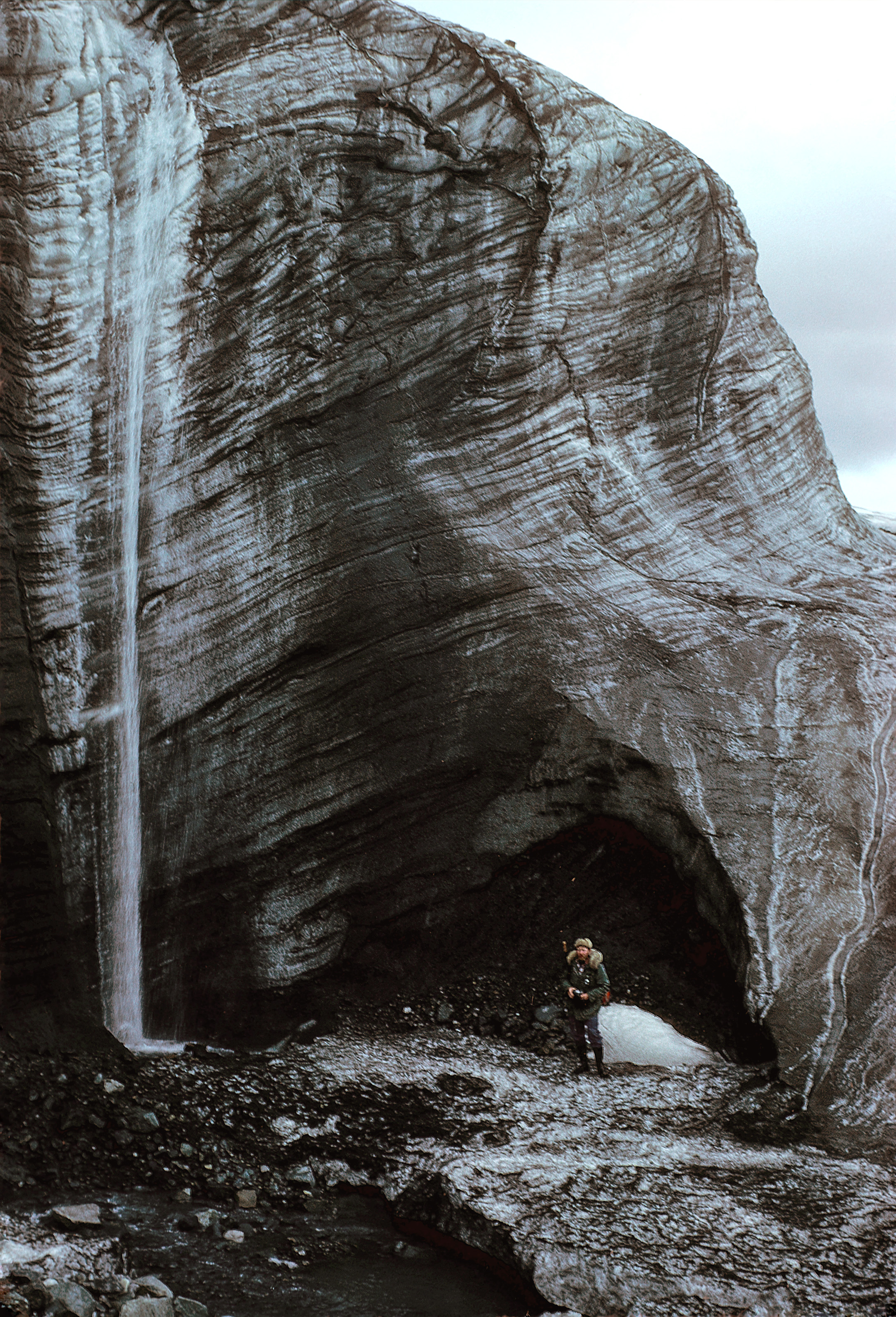
The overhanging icefront of the advancing Webber Glacier with waterfalls (Borup Fiord area, Northern Ellesmere Island) on July 20, 1978. Debris rich layers have been sheared and folded into the basal cold glacier ice. The glacier front is 6 km broad and up to 40 m high

A glacier originates at a location called its glacier head and terminates at its glacier foot, snout, or terminus.

Glaciers are broken into zones based on surface snowpack and melt conditions. The ablation zone is the region where there is a net loss in glacier mass. The upper part of a glacier, where accumulation exceeds ablation, is called the accumulation zone. The equilibrium line separates the ablation zone and the accumulation zone; it is the contour where the amount of new snow gained by accumulation is equal to the amount of ice lost through ablation. In general, the accumulation zone accounts for 60–70% of the glacier's surface area, more if the glacier calves icebergs. Ice in the accumulation zone is deep enough to exert a downward force that erodes underlying rock. After a glacier melts, it often leaves behind a bowl- or amphitheater-shaped depression that ranges in size from large basins like the Great Lakes to smaller mountain depressions known as cirques.

The accumulation zone can be subdivided based on its melt conditions.

1. The dry snow zone is a region where no melt occurs, even in the summer, and the snowpack remains dry.
2. The percolation zone is an area with some surface melt, causing meltwater to percolate into the snowpack. This zone is often marked by refrozen ice lenses, glands, and layers. The snowpack also never reaches the melting point.
3. Near the equilibrium line on some glaciers, a superimposed ice zone develops. This zone is where meltwater refreezes as a cold layer in the glacier, forming a continuous mass of ice.
4. The wet snow zone is the region where all of the snow deposited since the end of the previous summer has been raised to 0 °C.

The health of a glacier is usually assessed by determining the glacier mass balance or observing terminus behavior. Healthy glaciers have large accumulation zones, more than 60% of their area is snow-covered at the end of the melt season, and they have a terminus with a vigorous flow.

Following the Little Ice Age's end around 1850, glaciers around the Earth have retreated substantially. A slight cooling led to the advance of many alpine glaciers between 1950 and 1985, but since 1985 glacier retreat and mass loss has become larger and increasingly ubiquitous.

=== Structural glaciology ===
Glaciers are made of glacial ice, which is a type of rock, composed predominantly of the mineral Ice I_{h}, with minor inclusions of trapped gasses, sediments, and other debris frozen into the matrix. In geologic terms, glacial ice is a monomineralic metamorphic rock very close to its melting point, which accumulates predominantly through sedimentary processes, such as meteoric snowfall, but also involves igneous processes on a smaller scale, such melting and refreezing of ice.

Approaches from structural geology can be used to describe and characterize glaciers. These approaches have been used to enhance the description and understanding of glacial processes by analogy to other geologic structures, and to improve the description and understanding of processes in larger geologic structures by analogy to glaciers. Examples include structural mapping of glacier flow units and deformation features to give interpretive context to ice shelf collapse, and examining the deformation styles and zones of a glacier as an analogue to an extensional allochthon.

== Motion ==
The stress–strain relationship of plastic flow (green section): a small increase in stress creates an exponentially greater increase in strain, which equates to deformation speed.

Glaciers move downhill by the force of gravity and the internal deformation of ice. At the molecular level, ice consists of stacked layers of molecules with relatively weak bonds between layers. When the amount of strain (deformation) is proportional to the stress being applied, ice will act as an elastic solid. Ice needs to be at least 30 m (98 ft) thick to even start flowing, but once its thickness exceeds about 50 m (160 ft), stress on the layer above will exceeds the inter-layer binding strength, and then it will move faster than the layer below. This means that small amounts of stress can result in a large amount of strain, causing the deformation to become a plastic flow rather than elastic. Then, the glacier will begin to deform under its own weight and flow across the landscape. According to the Glen–Nye flow law, the relationship between stress and strain, and thus the rate of internal flow, can be modeled as follows:

$$\Sigma = k \tau^n,\,$$

where:

$\Sigma\,$ = shear strain (flow) rate
$\tau\,$ = stress
$n\,$ = a constant between 2–4 (typically 3 for most glaciers)
$k\,$ = a temperature-dependent constant

Differential erosion enhances relief, as clear in this very steep-sided Norwegian fjord.

The lowest velocities are near the base of the glacier and along valley sides where friction acts against flow, causing the most deformation. Velocity increases inward toward the center line and upward, as the amount of deformation decreases. The highest flow velocities are found at the surface, representing the sum of the velocities of all the layers below.

Because ice can flow faster where it is thicker, the rate of glacier-induced erosion is directly proportional to the thickness of overlying ice. Consequently, pre-glacial low hollows will be deepened and pre-existing topography will be amplified by glacial action, while nunataks, which protrude above ice sheets, barely erode at all – erosion has been estimated as 5 m per 1.2 million years. This explains, for example, the deep profile of fjords, which can reach a kilometer in depth as ice is topographically steered into them. The extension of fjords inland increases the rate of ice sheet thinning since they are the principal conduits for draining ice sheets. It also makes the ice sheets more sensitive to changes in climate and the ocean.

Although evidence in favor of glacial flow was known by the early 19th century, other theories of glacial motion were advanced, such as the idea that meltwater, refreezing inside glaciers, caused the glacier to dilate and extend its length. As it became clear that glaciers behaved to some degree as if the ice were a viscous fluid, it was argued that "regelation", or the melting and refreezing of ice at a temperature lowered by the pressure on the ice inside the glacier, was what allowed the ice to deform and flow. James Forbes came up with the essentially correct explanation in the 1840s, although it was several decades before it was fully accepted.

=== Fracture zone and cracks ===
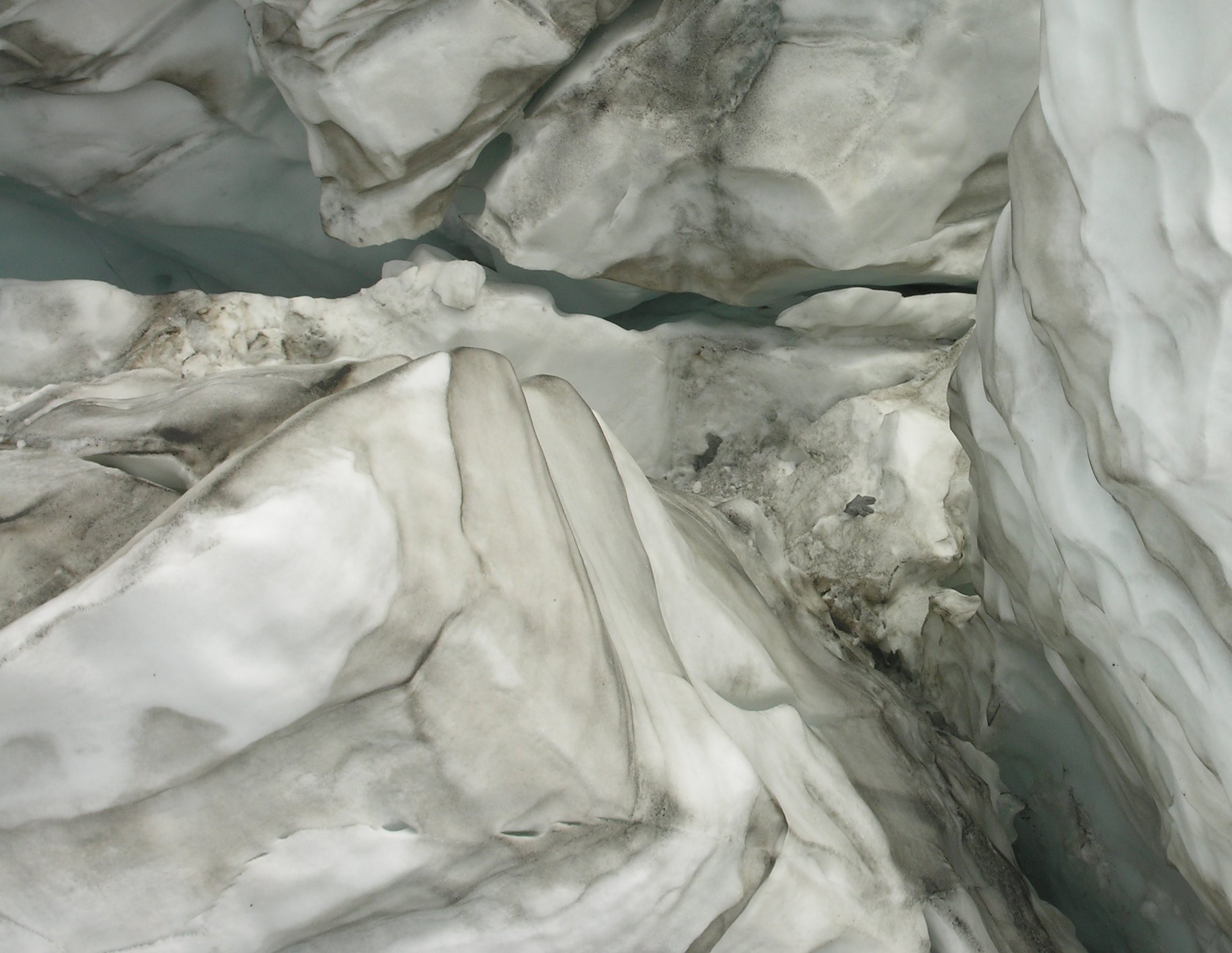
Ice cracks in the Titlis Glacier

The top 50 m (160 ft) of a glacier are rigid because they are under low pressure. This upper section is known as the fracture zone and moves mostly as a single unit over the plastic-flowing lower section. When a glacier moves through irregular terrain, cracks called crevasses develop in the fracture zone. Crevasses form because of differences in glacier velocity. If two rigid sections of a glacier move at different speeds or directions, shear forces cause them to break apart, opening a crevasse. Crevasses are seldom more than 46 m (150 ft) deep but, in some cases, can be at least 300 m (1,000 ft) deep. Beneath this point, the plasticity of the ice prevents the formation of cracks. Intersecting crevasses can create isolated peaks in the ice, called seracs.

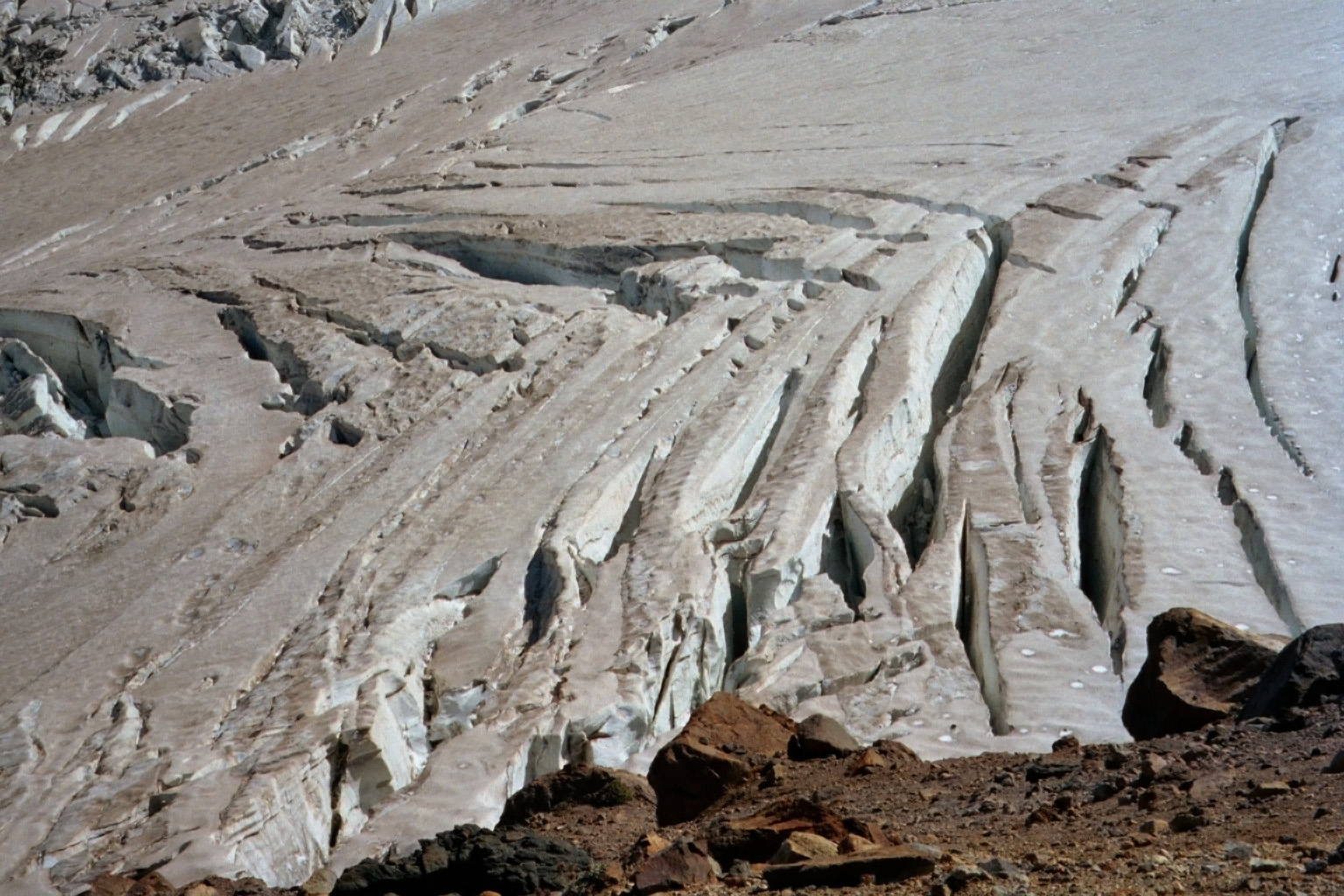
Shear or herring-bone crevasses on Emmons Glacier (Mount Rainier); such crevasses often form near the edge of a glacier where interactions with underlying or marginal rock impede flow. In this case, the impediment appears to be some distance from the near margin of the glacier.

Crevasses can form in several different ways. Transverse crevasses are transverse to flow and form where steeper slopes cause a glacier to accelerate. Longitudinal crevasses form semi-parallel to flow where a glacier expands laterally. Marginal crevasses form near the edge of the glacier, caused by the reduction in speed caused by friction of the valley walls. Marginal crevasses are largely transverse to flow. Moving glacier ice can sometimes separate from the stagnant ice above, forming a bergschrund. Bergschrunds resemble crevasses but are singular features at a glacier's margins. Crevasses make travel over glaciers hazardous, especially when they are hidden by fragile snow bridges.

Below the equilibrium line, glacial meltwater is concentrated in stream channels. Meltwater can pool in proglacial lakes on top of a glacier or descend into the depths of a glacier via moulins. Streams within or beneath a glacier flow in englacial or sub-glacial tunnels. These tunnels sometimes reemerge at the glacier's surface.

=== Subglacial processes ===
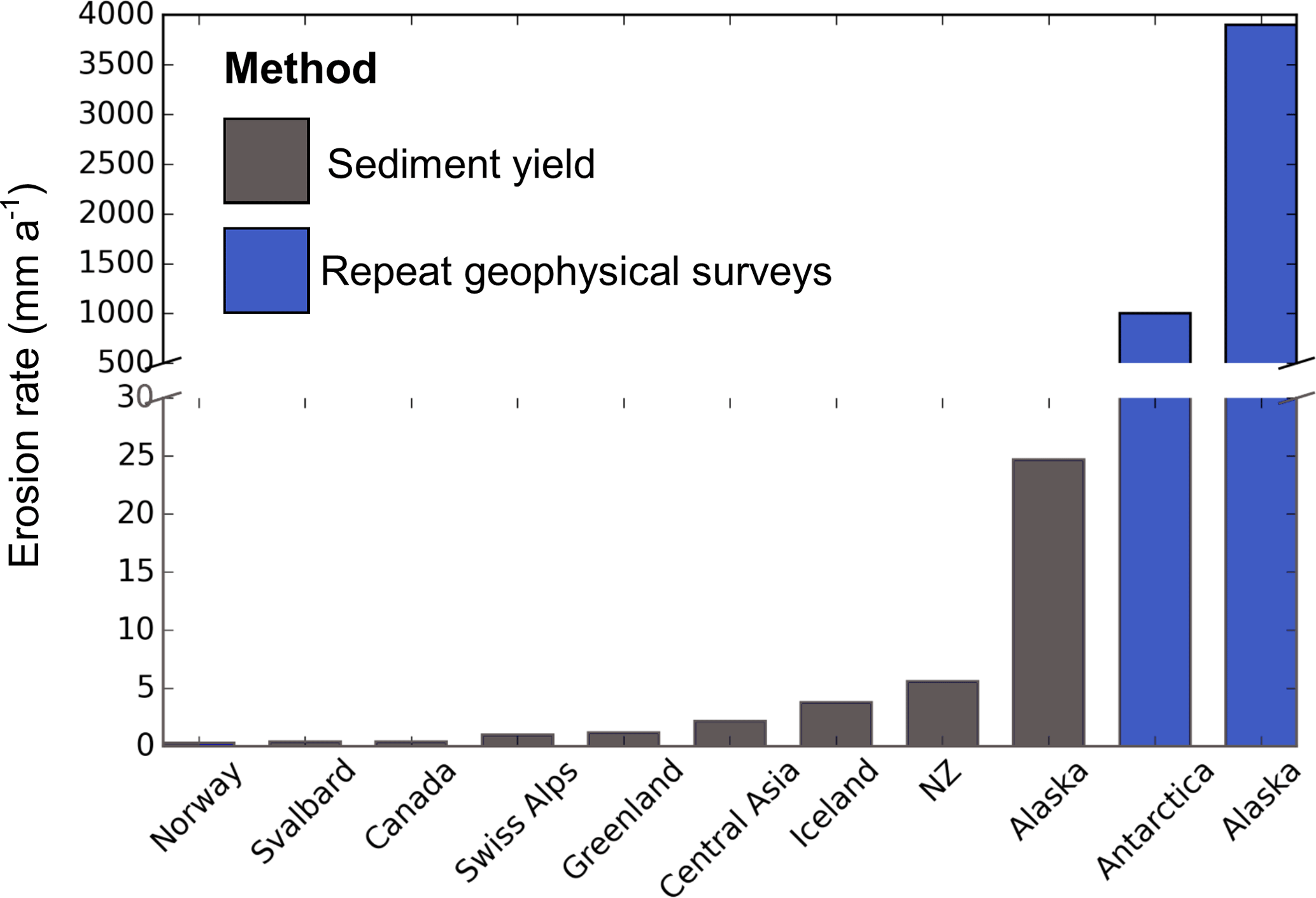
Erosion rates of subglacial sediment caused by the motion of different glaciers across the world

Most of the important processes controlling glacial motion occur in the ice-bed contact—even though it is only a few meters thick. The bed's temperature, roughness and softness define basal shear stress, which in turn defines whether movement of the glacier will be accommodated by motion in the sediments, or if it will be able to slide. A soft bed, with high porosity and low pore fluid pressure, allows the glacier to move by sediment sliding: the base of the glacier may even remain frozen to the bed, where the underlying sediment slips underneath it like a tube of toothpaste. A hard bed cannot deform in this way; therefore the only way for hard-based glaciers to move is by basal sliding, where meltwater forms between the ice and the bed itself. Whether a bed is hard or soft depends on the porosity and pore pressure; higher porosity decreases the sediment strength (thus increases the shear stress τ_{B}).

Porosity may vary through a range of methods.

- Movement of the overlying glacier may cause the bed to undergo dilatancy; the resulting shape change reorganizes blocks. This reorganizes closely packed blocks (a little like neatly folded, tightly packed clothes in a suitcase) into a messy jumble (just as clothes never fit back in when thrown in in a disordered fashion). This increases the porosity. Unless water is added, this will necessarily reduce the pore pressure (as the pore fluids have more space to occupy).
- Pressure may cause compaction and consolidation of underlying sediments. Since water is relatively incompressible, this is easier when the pore space is filled with vapor; any water must be removed to permit compression. In soils, this is an irreversible process.
- Sediment degradation by abrasion and fracture decreases the size of particles, which tends to decrease pore space. However, the motion of the particles may disorder the sediment, with the opposite effect. These processes also generate heat.

Bed softness may vary in space or time, and changes dramatically from glacier to glacier. An important factor is the underlying geology; glacial speeds tend to differ more when they change bedrock than when the gradient changes. Further, bed roughness can also act to slow glacial motion. The roughness of the bed is a measure of how many boulders and obstacles protrude into the overlying ice. Ice flows around these obstacles by melting under the high pressure on their stoss side; the resultant meltwater is then forced into the cavity arising in their lee side, where it re-freezes.

As well as affecting the sediment stress, fluid pressure (p_{w}) can affect the friction between the glacier and the bed. High fluid pressure provides a buoyancy force upwards on the glacier, reducing the friction at its base. The fluid pressure is compared to the ice overburden pressure, p_{i}, given by ρgh. Under fast-flowing ice streams, these two pressures will be approximately equal, with an effective pressure (p_{i} – p_{w}) of 30 kPa; i.e. all of the weight of the ice is supported by the underlying water, and the glacier is afloat.

==== Basal melting and sliding ====
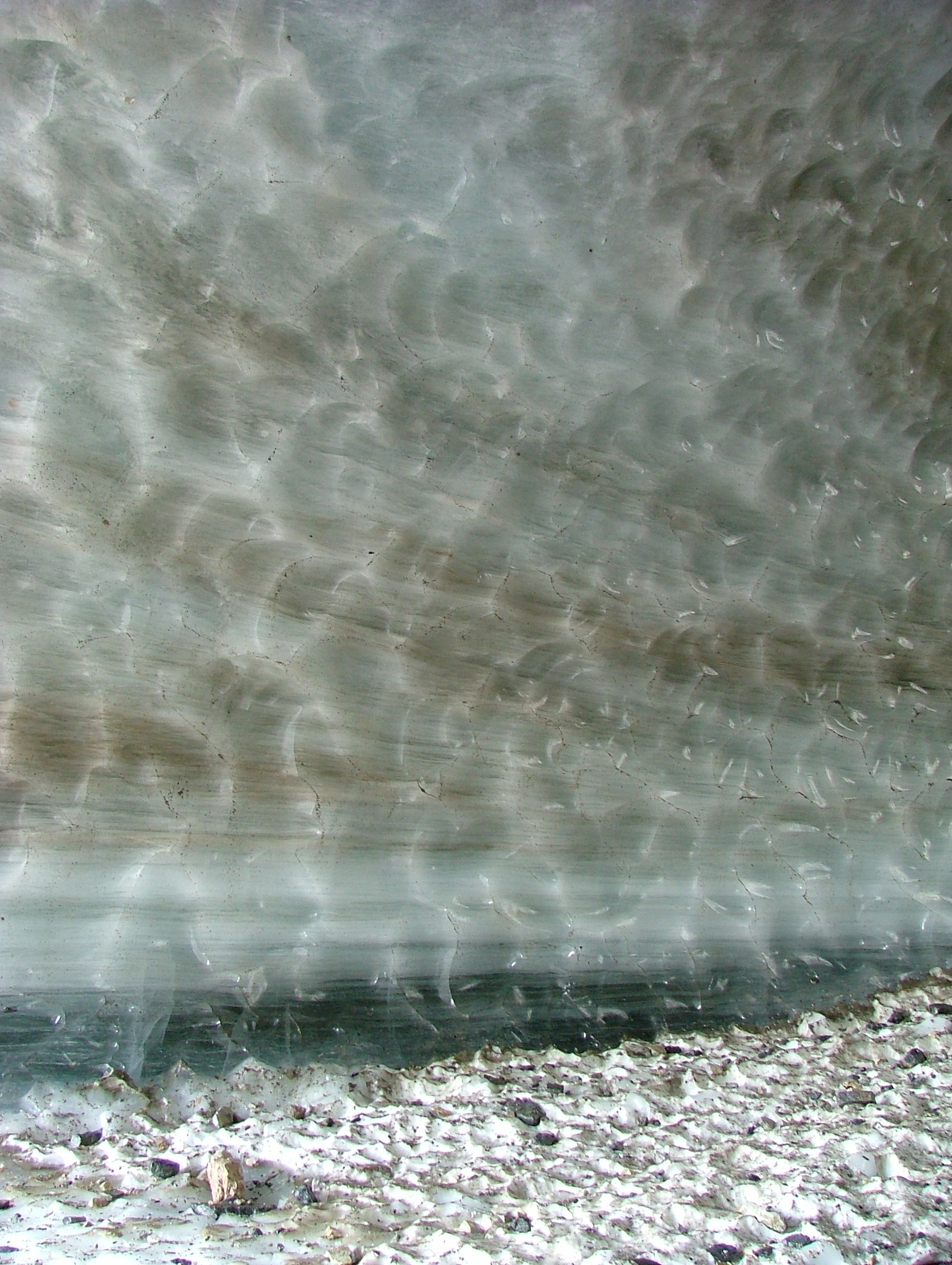
A cross-section through a glacier. The base of the glacier is more transparent as a result of melting.

Glaciers may also move by basal sliding, where the base of the glacier is lubricated by the presence of liquid water, reducing basal shear stress and allowing the glacier to slide over the terrain on which it sits. Meltwater may be produced by pressure-induced melting, friction or geothermal heat. The more variable the amount of melting at surface of the glacier, the faster the ice will flow. Basal sliding is dominant in temperate or warm-based glaciers.

τ_{D} = ρgh sin α
where τ_{D} is the driving stress, and α the ice surface slope in radians.

τ_{B} is the basal shear stress, a function of bed temperature and softness.

τ_{F}, the shear stress, is the lower of τ_{B} and τ_{D}. It controls the rate of plastic flow.

The presence of basal meltwater depends on both bed temperature and other factors. For instance, the melting point of water decreases under pressure, meaning that water melts at a lower temperature under thicker glaciers. This acts as a "double whammy", because thicker glaciers have a lower heat conductance, meaning that the basal temperature is also likely to be higher. Bed temperature tends to vary in a cyclic fashion. A cool bed has a high strength, reducing the speed of the glacier. This increases the rate of accumulation, since newly fallen snow is not transported away. Consequently, the glacier thickens, with three consequences: firstly, the bed is better insulated, allowing greater retention of geothermal heat.

Secondly, the increased pressure can facilitate melting. Most importantly, τ_{D} is increased. These factors will combine to accelerate the glacier. As friction increases with the square of velocity, faster motion will greatly increase frictional heating, with ensuing melting – which causes a positive feedback, increasing ice speed to a faster flow rate still: west Antarctic glaciers are known to reach velocities of up to a kilometer per year. Eventually, the ice will be surging fast enough that it begins to thin, as accumulation cannot keep up with the transport. This thinning will increase the conductive heat loss, slowing the glacier and causing freezing. This freezing will slow the glacier further, often until it is stationary, whence the cycle can begin again.

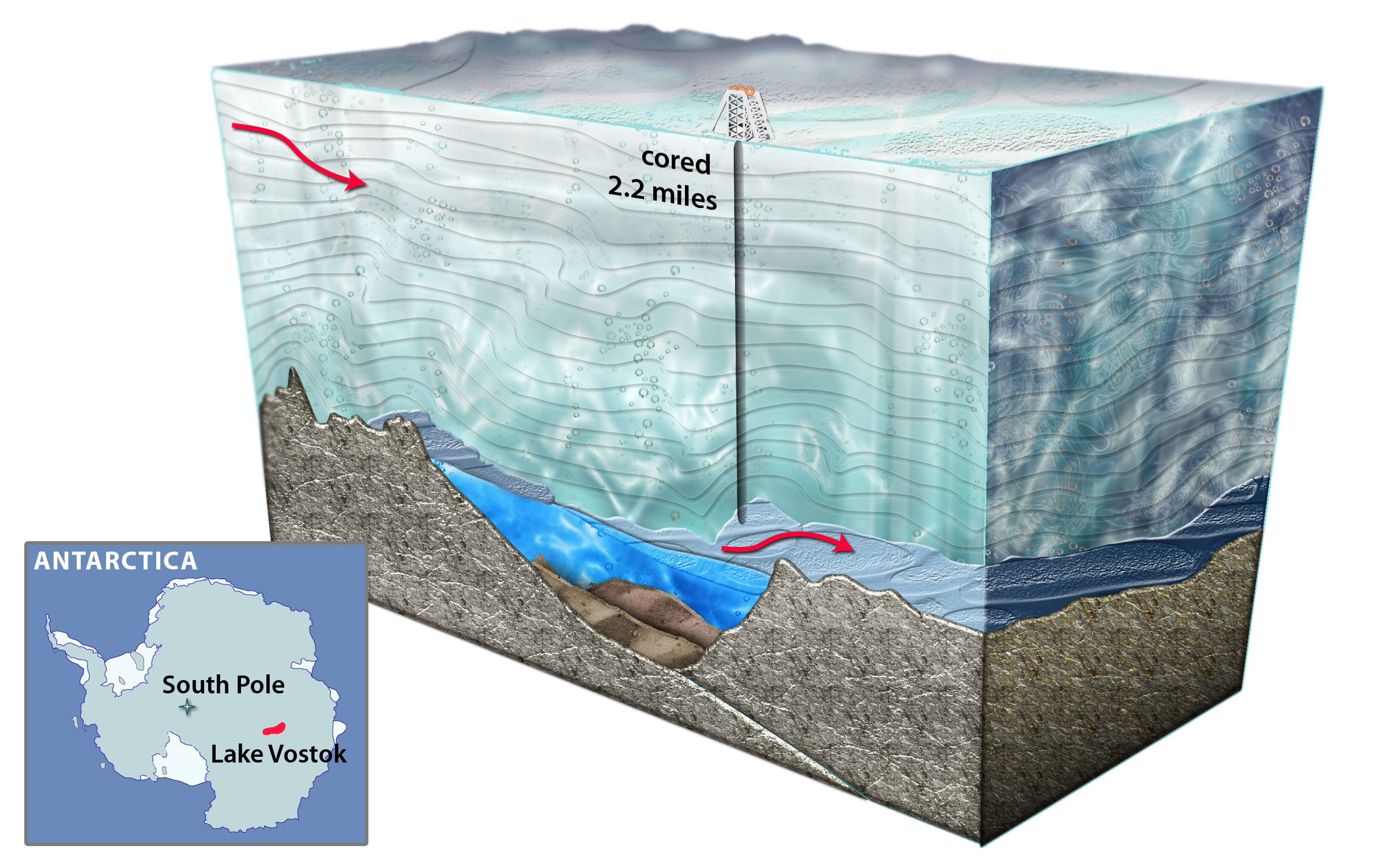
Location and diagram of Lake Vostok, a prominent subglacial lake beneath the East Antarctic Ice Sheet.

The flow of water under the glacial surface can have a large effect on the motion of the glacier itself. Subglacial lakes contain significant amounts of water, which can move fast: cubic kilometers can be transported between lakes over the course of a couple of years. This motion is thought to occur in two main modes: pipe flow involves liquid water moving through pipe-like conduits, like a sub-glacial river; sheet flow involves motion of water in a thin layer. A switch between the two flow conditions may be associated with surging behavior. Indeed, the loss of sub-glacial water supply has been linked with the shut-down of ice movement in the Kamb ice stream. The subglacial motion of water is expressed in the surface topography of ice sheets, which slump down into vacated subglacial lakes.

=== Speed ===
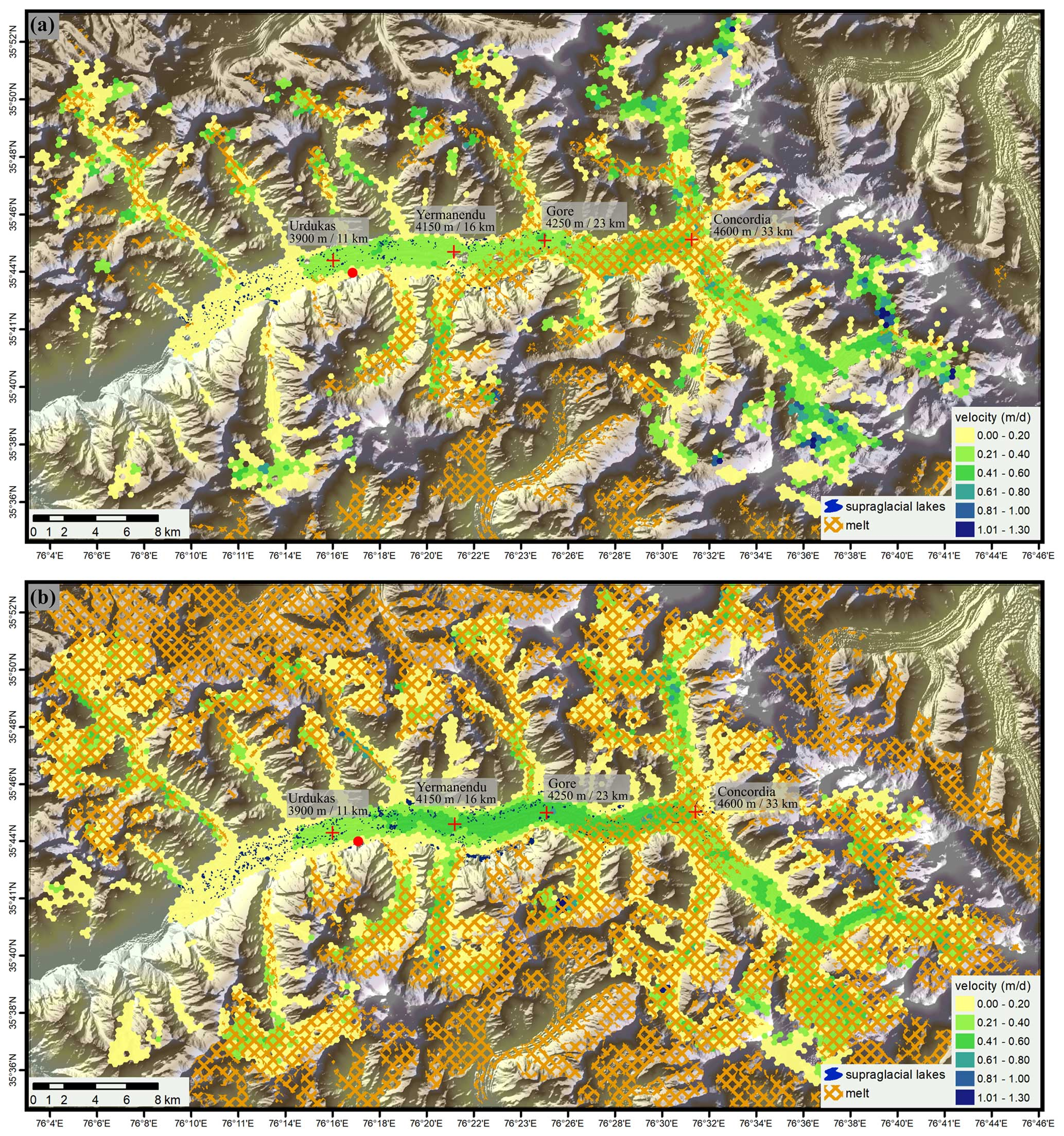
The formation of supraglacial lakes at Baltoro Glacier in April 2018 (top) had substantially accelerated its melting and motion in the following summer months (bottom)

The speed of glacial displacement is partly determined by friction. Friction makes the ice at the bottom of the glacier move more slowly than ice at the top. In alpine glaciers, friction is also generated at the valley's sidewalls, which slows the edges relative to the center.

Mean glacial speed varies greatly but is typically around 1 m (3 ft) per day. There may be no motion in stagnant areas; for example, in parts of Alaska, trees can establish themselves on surface sediment deposits. In other cases, glaciers can move as fast as 20–30 m (70–100 ft) per day, such as in Greenland's Jacobshavn Isbræ. Glacial speed is affected by factors such as slope, ice thickness, snowfall, longitudinal confinement, basal temperature, meltwater production, and bed hardness.

A few glaciers have periods of very rapid advancement called surges. These glaciers exhibit normal movement until suddenly they accelerate, then return to their previous movement state. These surges may be caused by the failure of the underlying bedrock, the pooling of meltwater at the base of the glacier — perhaps delivered from a supraglacial lake — or the simple accumulation of mass beyond a critical "tipping point". Temporary rates up to 90 m (300 ft) per day have occurred when increased temperature or overlying pressure caused bottom ice to melt and water to accumulate beneath a glacier.

In glaciated areas where the glacier moves faster than one km per year, glacial earthquakes occur. These are large scale earthquakes that have seismic magnitudes as high as 6.1. The number of glacial earthquakes in Greenland peaks every year in July, August, and September and increased rapidly in the 1990s and 2000s. In a study using data from January 1993 through October 2005, more events were detected every year since 2002, and twice as many events were recorded in 2005 as there were in any other year.

=== Ogives ===
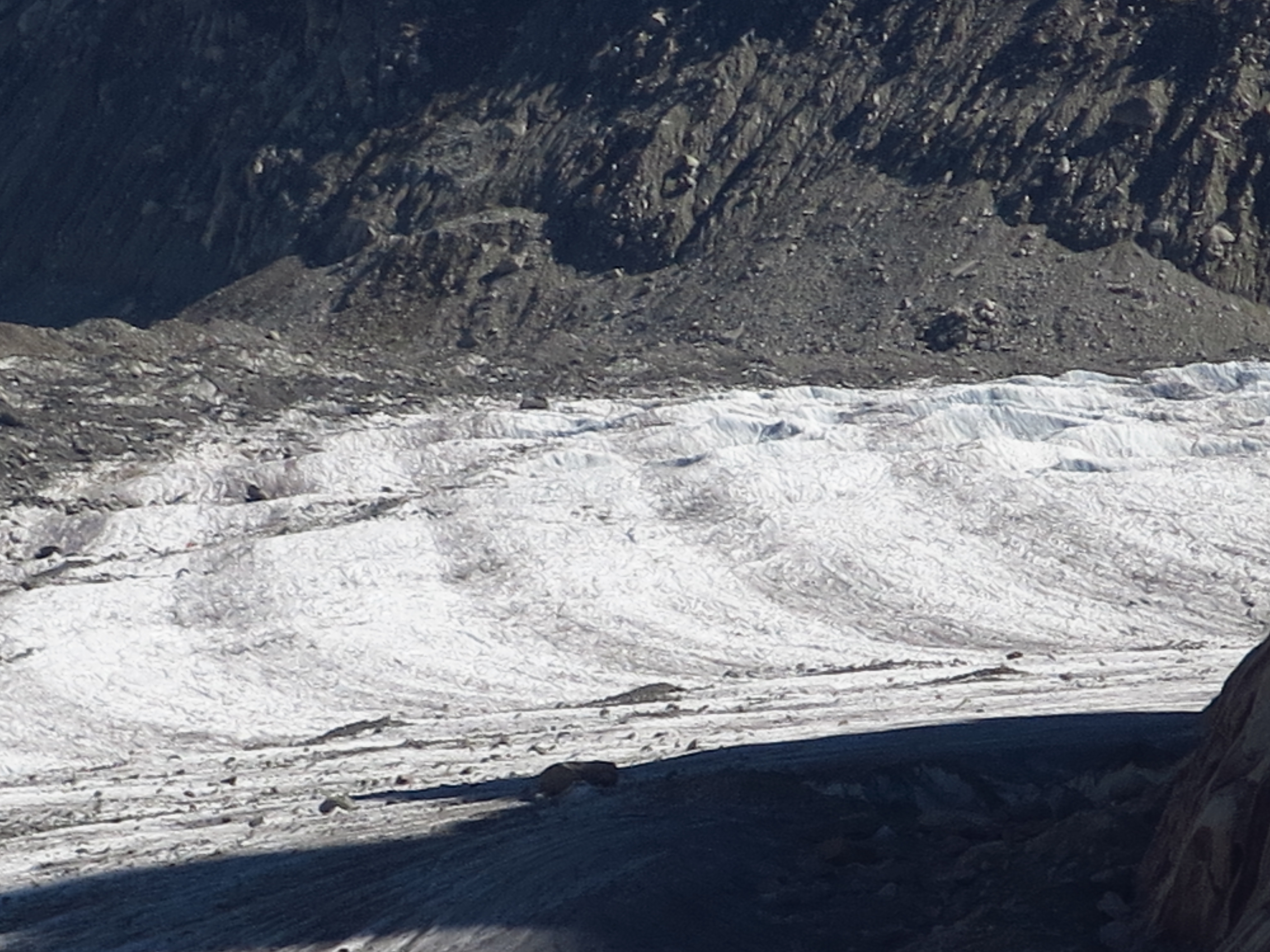
Forbes bands on the Mer de Glace glacier in France

Ogives or Forbes bands are alternating wave crests and valleys that appear as dark and light bands of ice on glacier surfaces. They are linked to seasonal motion of glaciers; the width of one dark and one light band generally equals the annual movement of the glacier. Ogives are formed when ice from an icefall is severely broken up, increasing ablation surface area during summer. This creates a swale and space for snow accumulation in the winter, which in turn creates a ridge. Sometimes ogives consist only of undulations or color bands and are described as wave ogives or band ogives.

=== Glacier collapse ===
Sometimes a large part of a glacier can suddenly break apart and slide downslope. Such a glacier collapse can cause severe damage and floods.

== Geography ==
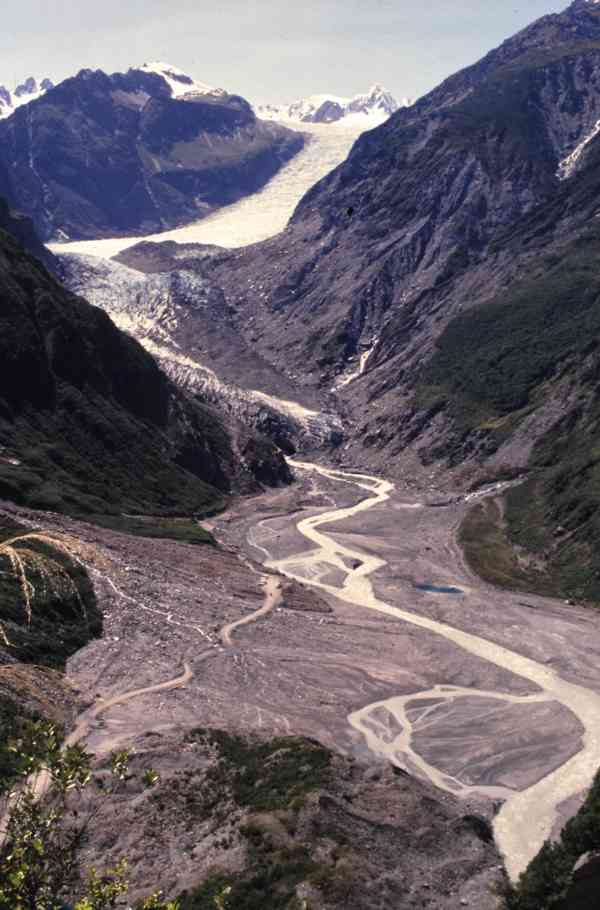
Fox Glacier in New Zealand finishes near a rainforest

Glaciers are present on every continent and in approximately fifty countries, excluding those (Australia, South Africa) that have glaciers only on distant subantarctic island territories. Extensive glaciers are found in Antarctica, Argentina, Chile, Canada, Pakistan, Alaska, Greenland and Iceland. Mountain glaciers are widespread, especially in the Andes, the Himalayas, the Rocky Mountains, the Caucasus, Scandinavian Mountains, and the Alps. Snezhnika glacier in Pirin Mountain, Bulgaria with a latitude of 41°46′09″ N is the southernmost glacial mass in Europe. Mainland Australia currently contains no glaciers, although a small glacier on Mount Kosciuszko was present in the last glacial period. In New Guinea, small, rapidly diminishing, glaciers are located on Puncak Jaya. Africa has glaciers on Mount Kilimanjaro in Tanzania, on Mount Kenya, and in the Rwenzori Mountains. Oceanic islands with glaciers include Iceland, several of the islands off the coast of Norway including Svalbard and Jan Mayen to the far north, New Zealand and the subantarctic islands of Marion, Heard, Grande Terre (Kerguelen) and Bouvet. During glacial periods of the Quaternary, Taiwan, Hawaii on Mauna Kea and Tenerife also had large alpine glaciers, while the Faroe and Crozet Islands were completely glaciated.

The permanent snow cover necessary for glacier formation is affected by factors such as the degree of slope on the land, amount of snowfall and the winds. Glaciers can be found in all latitudes except from 20° to 27° north and south of the equator where the presence of the descending limb of the Hadley circulation lowers precipitation so much that with high insolation snow lines reach above 6,500 m (21,330 ft). Between 19˚N and 19˚S, however, precipitation is higher, and the mountains above 5,000 m (16,400 ft) usually have permanent snow.

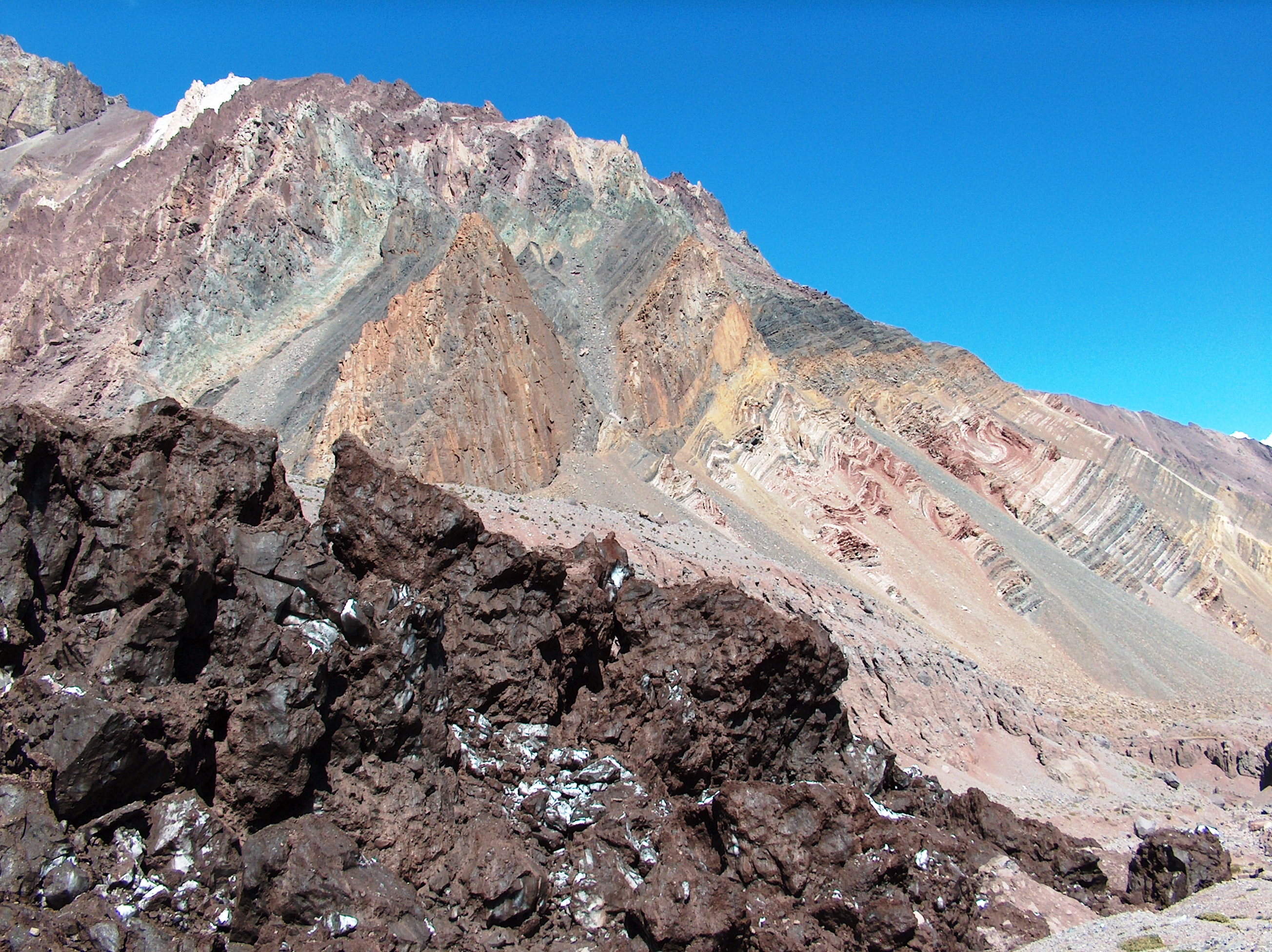
Black ice glacier near Aconcagua, Argentina

Even at high latitudes, glacier formation is not inevitable. Areas of the Arctic, such as Banks Island, and the McMurdo Dry Valleys in Antarctica are considered polar deserts where glaciers cannot form because they receive little snowfall despite the bitter cold. Cold air, unlike warm air, is unable to transport much water vapor. Even during glacial periods of the Quaternary, Manchuria, lowland Siberia, and central and northern Alaska, though extraordinarily cold, had such light snowfall that glaciers could not form.

In addition to the dry, unglaciated polar regions, some mountains and volcanoes in Bolivia, Chile and Argentina are high (4,500 to 6,900 m or 14,800 to 22,600 ft) and cold, but the relative lack of precipitation prevents snow from accumulating into glaciers. This is because these peaks are located near or in the hyperarid Atacama Desert.

== Glacial geology ==
=== Erosion ===
Diagram of glacial plucking and abrasion

Glaciers erode terrain through two principal processes: plucking and abrasion.

As glaciers flow over bedrock, they soften and lift blocks of rock into the ice. This process, called plucking, is caused by subglacial water that penetrates fractures in the bedrock and subsequently freezes and expands. This expansion causes the ice to act as a lever that loosens the rock by lifting it. Thus, sediments of all sizes become part of the glacier's load. If a retreating glacier gains enough debris, it may become a rock glacier, like the Timpanogos Glacier in Utah.

Abrasion occurs when the ice and its load of rock fragments slide over bedrock and function as sandpaper, smoothing and polishing the bedrock below. The pulverized rock this process produces is called rock flour and is made up of rock grains between 0.002 and 0.00625 mm in size. Abrasion leads to steeper valley walls and mountain slopes in alpine settings, which can cause avalanches and rock slides, which add even more material to the glacier. Glacial abrasion is commonly characterized by glacial striations. Glaciers produce these when they contain large boulders that carve long scratches in the bedrock. By mapping the direction of the striations, researchers can determine the direction of the glacier's movement. Similar to striations are chatter marks, lines of crescent-shape depressions in the rock underlying a glacier. They are formed by abrasion when boulders in the glacier are repeatedly caught and released as they are dragged along the bedrock.

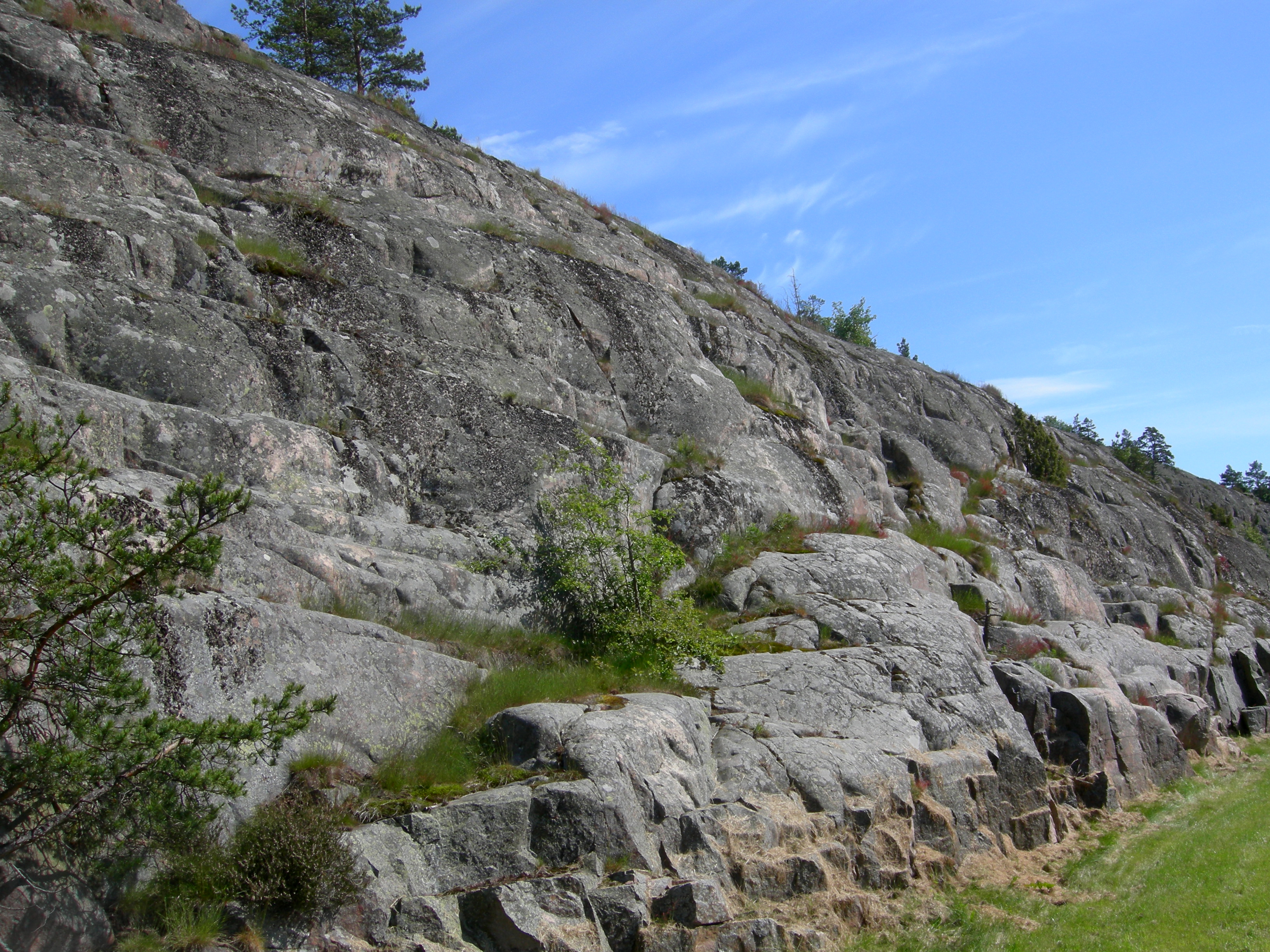
Glacially plucked granitic bedrock near Mariehamn, Åland

The rate of glacier erosion varies. Six factors control erosion rate:

- Velocity of glacial movement
- Thickness of the ice
- Shape, abundance and hardness of rock fragments contained in the ice at the bottom of the glacier
- Relative ease of erosion of the surface under the glacier
- Thermal conditions at the glacier base
- Permeability and water pressure at the glacier base

When the bedrock has frequent fractures on the surface, glacial erosion rates tend to increase as plucking is the main erosive force on the surface; when the bedrock has wide gaps between sporadic fractures, however, abrasion tends to be the dominant erosive form and glacial erosion rates become slow. Glaciers in lower latitudes tend to be much more erosive than glaciers in higher latitudes, because they have more meltwater reaching the glacial base and facilitate sediment production and transport under the same moving speed and amount of ice.

Material that becomes incorporated in a glacier is typically carried as far as the zone of ablation before being deposited. Glacial deposits are of two distinct types:

- Glacial till: material directly deposited from glacial ice. Till includes a mixture of undifferentiated material ranging from clay size to boulders, the usual composition of a moraine.
- Fluvial and outwash sediments: sediments deposited by water. These deposits are stratified by size.

Larger chunks of rock that are encrusted in till or deposited on the surface are called "glacial erratics". They range in size from pebbles to boulders, but as they are often moved great distances, they may be drastically different from the material upon which they are found. Patterns of glacial erratics hint at past glacial motions.

=== Moraines ===
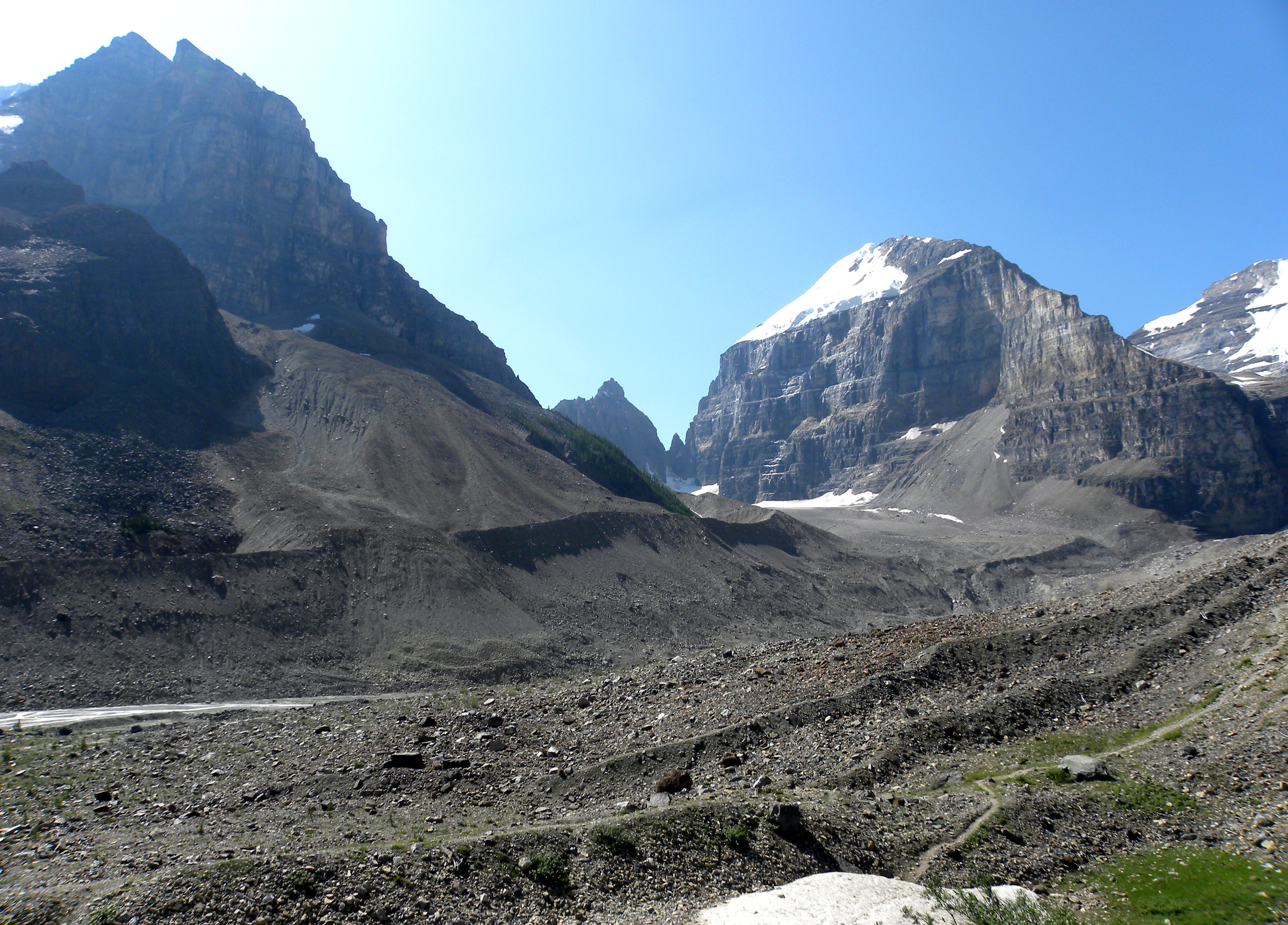
Glacial moraines above Lake Louise, Alberta, Canada

Glacial moraines are formed by the deposition of material from a glacier and are exposed after the glacier has retreated. They usually appear as linear mounds of till, a non-sorted mixture of rock, gravel, and boulders within a matrix of fine powdery material. Terminal or end moraines are formed at the foot or terminal end of a glacier. Lateral moraines are formed on the sides of the glacier. Medial moraines are formed when a glacier meets its tributary glacier and merge, and the lateral moraines of each coalesce to form a moraine in the middle of the combined glacier. Less apparent are ground moraines, also called glacial drift, which often blankets the surface underneath the glacier downslope from the equilibrium line. The term moraine is of French origin. It was coined by peasants to describe alluvial embankments and rims found near the margins of glaciers in the French Alps. In modern geology, the term is used more broadly and is applied to a series of formations, all of which are composed of till. Moraines can also create moraine-dammed lakes.

=== Drumlins ===
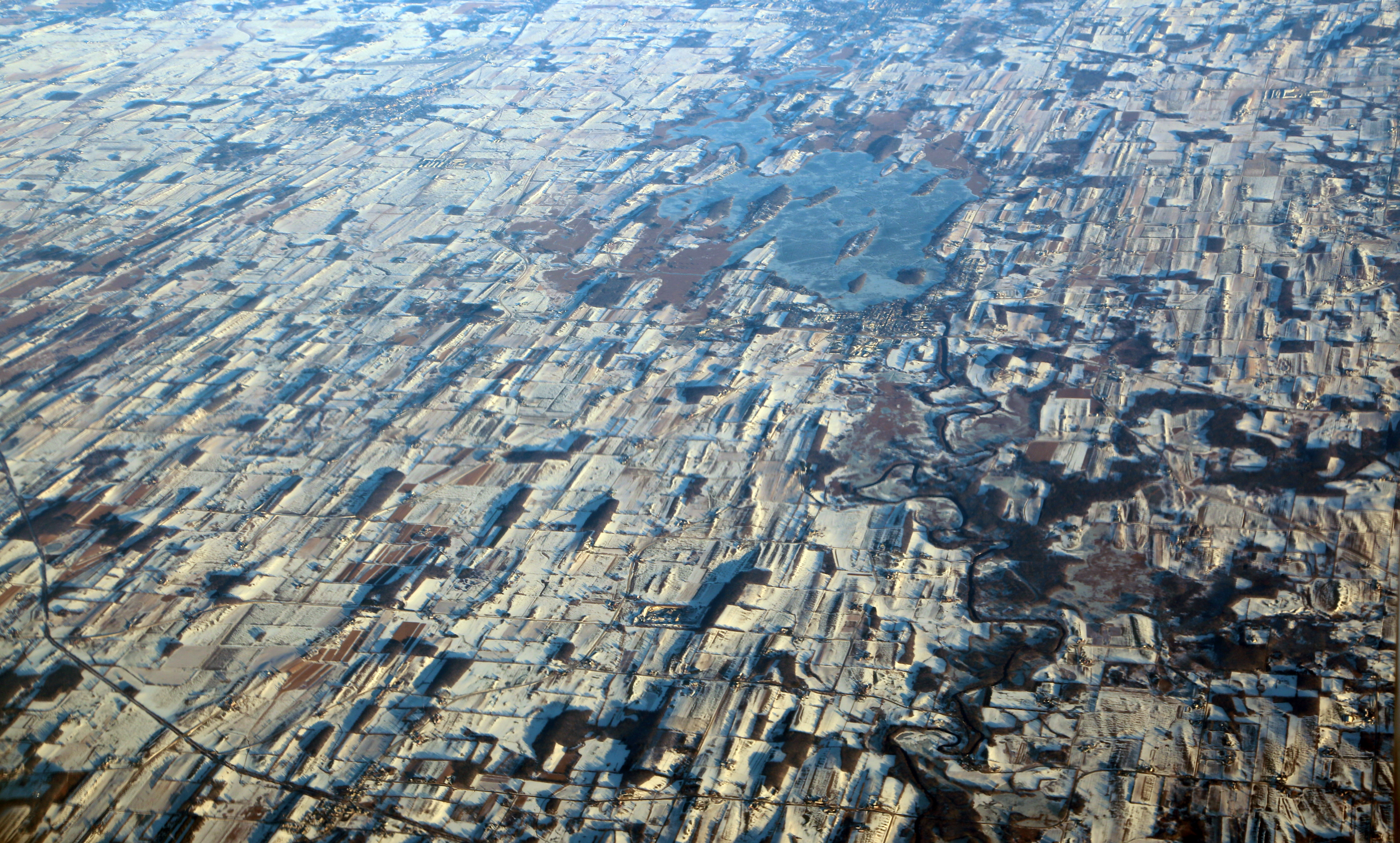
Drumlins around Horicon Marsh, Wisconsin, in an area with one of the highest concentration of drumlins in the world. The curved path of the Laurentide Ice Sheet is evident in the orientation of the various mounds.

Drumlins are asymmetrical, canoe-shaped hills made mainly of glacial sediments. Their heights vary from 15 to 50 meters, and they can reach a kilometer in length. The steepest side of the hill faces the direction from which the ice advanced (stoss), while a longer slope is left in the ice's direction of movement (lee). Drumlins are found in groups called drumlin fields or drumlin camps. One of these fields is found east of Rochester, New York; it is estimated to contain about 10,000 drumlins. Although the process that forms drumlins is not fully understood, their shape implies that they are products of the plastic deformation zone of ancient glaciers. It is believed that many drumlins were formed when glaciers advanced over and altered the deposits of earlier glaciers.

=== Glacial valleys, cirques, arêtes, and pyramidal peaks ===
Features of a glacial landscape

Before glaciation, mountain valleys have a characteristic "V" shape, produced by eroding water. During glaciation, these valleys are often widened, deepened and smoothed to form a U-shaped glacial valley or glacial trough, as it is sometimes called. The erosion that creates glacial valleys truncates any spurs of rock or earth that may have earlier extended across the valley, creating broadly triangular-shaped cliffs called truncated spurs. Within glacial valleys, depressions created by plucking and abrasion can be filled by lakes, called paternoster lakes. If a glacial valley runs into a large body of water, it forms a fjord.

Typically glaciers deepen their valleys more than their smaller tributaries. Therefore, when glaciers recede, the valleys of the tributary glaciers remain above the main glacier's depression and are called hanging valleys.

At the start of a classic valley glacier is a bowl-shaped cirque, which have escarped walls on three sides but is open on the side that descends into the valley called the "lip". Cirques are where ice begins to accumulate in a glacier. Two glacial cirques may form back to back and erode their backwalls until only a narrow ridge, called an arête is left. This structure may result in a mountain pass. If multiple cirques encircle a single mountain, they create pointed pyramidal peaks; particularly steep examples are called horns.

=== Roches moutonnées ===
Passage of glacial ice over an area of bedrock may cause the rock to be sculpted into a knoll called a roche moutonnée, or "sheepback" rock. Roches moutonnées may be elongated, rounded and asymmetrical in shape. They range in length from less than a meter to several hundred meters long. Roches moutonnées have a gentle slope on their up-glacier sides and a steep to vertical face on their down-glacier sides. The glacier abrades the smooth slope on the upstream side as it flows along, but tears rock fragments loose and carries them away from the downstream side via plucking.

=== Alluvial stratification ===
As the water that rises from the ablation zone moves away from the glacier, it carries fine eroded sediments with it. As the speed of the water decreases, so does its capacity to carry objects in suspension. The water thus gradually deposits the sediment as it runs, creating an alluvial plain. When this phenomenon occurs in a valley, it is called a valley train. When the deposition is in an estuary, the sediments are known as bay mud. Outwash plains and valley trains are usually accompanied by basins known as "kettles". These are small lakes formed when large ice blocks that are trapped in alluvium melt and produce water-filled depressions. Kettle diameters range from 5 m to 13 km, with depths of up to 45 meters. Most are circular in shape because the blocks of ice that formed them were rounded as they melted.

=== Glacial deposits ===
Landscape produced by a receding glacier

When a glacier's size shrinks below a critical point, its flow stops and it becomes stationary. Meanwhile, meltwater within and beneath the ice leaves stratified alluvial deposits. These deposits, in the forms of columns, terraces and clusters, remain after the glacier melts and are known as "glacial deposits". Glacial deposits that take the shape of hills or mounds are called kames. Some kames form when meltwater deposits sediments through openings in the interior of the ice. Others are produced by fans or deltas created by meltwater. When the glacial ice occupies a valley, it can form terraces or kames along the sides of the valley. Long, sinuous glacial deposits are called eskers. Eskers are composed of sand and gravel that was deposited by meltwater streams that flowed through ice tunnels within or beneath a glacier. They remain after the ice melts, with heights exceeding 100 meters and lengths of as long as 100 km.

=== Loess deposits ===
Very fine glacial sediments or rock flour is often picked up by wind blowing over the bare surface and may be deposited great distances from the original fluvial deposition site. These eolian loess deposits may be very deep, even hundreds of meters, as in areas of China and the Midwestern United States. Katabatic winds can be important in this process.

== Retreat of glaciers due to climate change ==
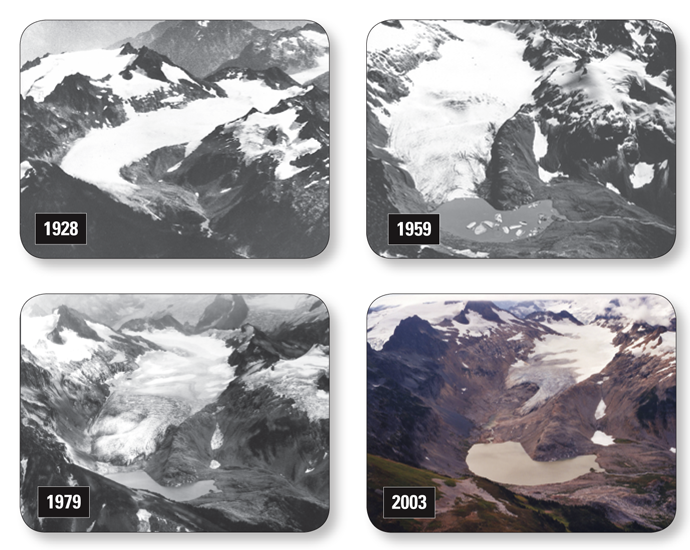
South Cascade Glacier in Washington photographs from 1928 to 2003 showing the recent rapid glacier retreating.

Globally in recent decades, the mass of glaciers has persistently declined, with the rate of annual loss accelerating.

Based on current national pledges, global warming is projected to cause loss of ~half of Earth's glaciers by 2100 and raise sea level by ~115 mm (~4.5 in.) (not counting rise from melting ice sheets).

Human activities in the industrial era have increased the concentration of carbon dioxide and other heat-trapping greenhouse gases in the air, causing current global warming. Human influence is the principal driver of changes to the cryosphere of which glaciers are a part.

Global warming creates positive feedback loops with glaciers. For example, in ice–albedo feedback, rising temperatures increase glacier melt, exposing more of earth's land and sea surface (which is darker than glacier ice), allowing sunlight to warm the surface rather than being reflected back into space. Reference glaciers tracked by the World Glacier Monitoring Service have lost ice every year since 1988. A study that investigated the period 1995 to 2022 showed that the flow velocity of glaciers in the Alps accelerates and slows down to a similar extent at the same time, despite large distances. This clearly shows that their speed is controlled by the climate change.

Water runoff from melting glaciers causes global sea level to rise, a phenomenon the IPCC terms a "slow onset" event. Impacts at least partially attributable to sea level rise include for example encroachment on coastal settlements and infrastructure, existential threats to small islands and low-lying coasts, losses of coastal ecosystems and ecosystem services, groundwater salinization, and compounding damage from tropical cyclones, flooding, storm surges, and land subsidence.

In 2023, Switzerland lost 4% of its glacier volume, a massive acceleration compared to previous years. Switzerland reportedly spends close to US $500 million annually on defensive infrastructure, such as reinforced barriers, avalanche nets, and drainage systems, to protect vulnerable Alpine settlements from glaciers.

Recognising the importance of the role of climate change in glacier melt, in 2025 the United Nations declared the International Year of Glaciers' Preservation.

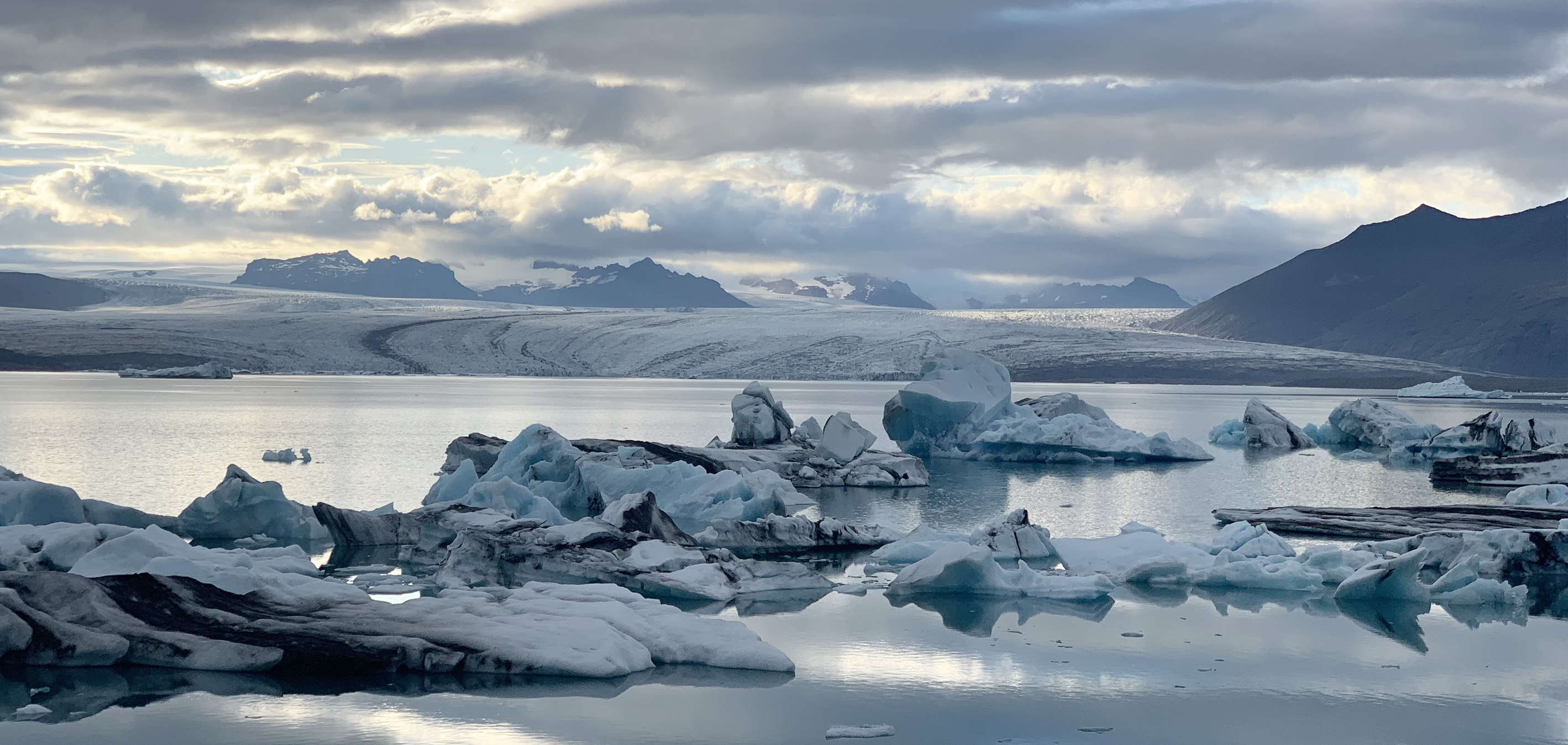
Ice lagoon Jökulsárlón at the foot of the Vatnajökull Glacier, Iceland, 2023

=== Glaciers as climate monitors ===
Glaciers, which can be hundreds of thousands of years old, are used to track climate change over long periods of time. Researchers melt or crush samples from glacier ice cores whose progressively deep layers represent respectively earlier times in Earth's climate history. The researchers apply various instruments to the content of bubbles trapped in the cores' layers in order to track changes in the atmosphere's composition. Temperatures are deduced from differing relative concentrations of respective gases, confirming that for at least the last million years, global temperatures have been linked to carbon dioxide concentrations.

== Isostatic rebound ==
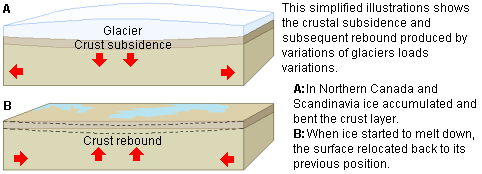
Isostatic pressure by a glacier on the Earth's crust

Large masses, such as ice sheets or glaciers, can depress the crust of the Earth into the mantle. The depression usually totals a third of the ice sheet or glacier's thickness. After the ice sheet or glacier melts, the mantle begins to flow back to its original position, pushing the crust back up. This post-glacial rebound, which proceeds very slowly after the melting of the ice sheet or glacier, is currently occurring in measurable amounts in Scandinavia and the Great Lakes region of North America.

A geomorphological feature created by the same process on a smaller scale is known as dilation-faulting. It occurs where previously compressed rock is allowed to return to its original shape more rapidly than can be maintained without faulting. This leads to an effect similar to what would be seen if the rock were hit by a large hammer. Dilation faulting can be observed in recently de-glaciated parts of Iceland and Cumbria.

== On other planets ==
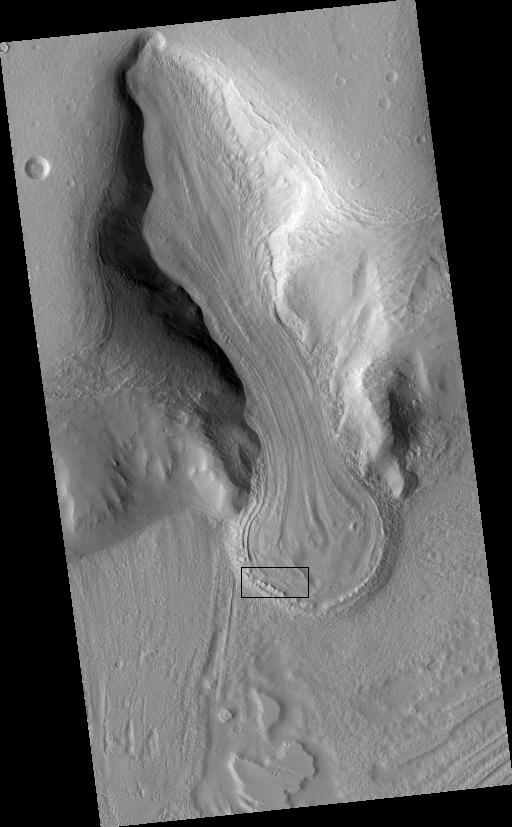
Protonilus Mensae, Ismenius Lacus quadrangle, Mars

The polar ice caps of Mars show geologic evidence of glacial deposits. The south polar cap is especially comparable to glaciers on Earth. Topographical features and computer models indicate the existence of more glaciers in Mars' past. At mid-latitudes, between 35° and 65° north or south, Martian glaciers are affected by the thin Martian atmosphere. Because of the low atmospheric pressure, ablation near the surface is solely caused by sublimation, not melting. As on Earth, many glaciers are covered with a layer of rocks which insulates the ice. A radar instrument on board the Mars Reconnaissance Orbiter found ice under a thin layer of rocks in formations called lobate debris aprons (LDAs).

In 2015, as New Horizons flew by the Pluto–Charon system, the spacecraft discovered a massive basin—named Sputnik Planitia—covered in a layer of nitrogen ice on Pluto. A large portion of the basin's surface is divided into irregular polygonal features separated by narrow troughs, interpreted as convection cells fueled by internal heat from Pluto's interior. Glacial flows on Pluto were also observed near Sputnik Planitia's margins, appearing to flow both into and out of the basin.

== See also ==
- Glacial landform – Landform created by the action of glaciers
- Glacial motion – Geological phenomenon
- Glacier growing – Artificial process used for making glaciers
- Glacier morphology – Geomorphology of glaciers
- Ice jam – Accumulation of ice in a river
