= Cryoseism =

Non-tectonic seismic event

A cryoseism, ice quake or frost quake, is a seismic event caused by a sudden cracking action in frozen soil or rock saturated with water or ice, or by stresses generated at frozen lakes. As water drains into the ground, it may eventually freeze and expand under colder temperatures, putting stress on its surroundings. This stress builds up until relieved explosively in the form of a cryoseism. The requirements for a cryoseism to occur are numerous; therefore, accurate predictions are not entirely possible and may constitute a factor in structural design and engineering when constructing in an area historically known for such events. Speculation has been made between global warming and the frequency of cryoseisms.

== Effects ==
Cryoseisms are often mistaken for minor intraplate earthquakes. Initial indications may appear similar to those of an earthquake with tremors, vibrations, ground cracking and related noises, such as thundering or booming sounds. Cryoseisms can, however, be distinguished from earthquakes through meteorological and geological conditions. Cryoseisms can have an intensity of up to VI on the Modified Mercalli Scale. Furthermore, cryoseisms often exhibit high intensity in a very localized area, in the immediate proximity of the epicenter, as compared to the widespread effects of an earthquake. Due to lower-frequency vibrations of cryoseisms, some seismic monitoring stations may not record their occurrence. Cryoseisms release less energy than most tectonic events. Since cryoseisms occur at the ground surface they can cause effects right at the site, enough to jar people awake.

Some reports have indicated the presence of "distant flashing lights" before or during a cryoseism, possibly because of electrical changes when rocks are compressed. Cracks and fissures may also appear as surface areas contract and split apart from the cold. The sometime superficial to moderate occurrences may range from a few centimeters to several kilometers long, with either singular or multiple linear fracturing and vertical or lateral displacement possible.

== Occurrences ==
=== Glacial cryoseisms ===
A glacial cryoseism or glacial ice quake is a non-tectonic seismic event of the glacial cryosphere. A large variety of seismogenic glacial processes arising from internal, ocean calving, or basal processes have been identified and studied. Very large calving events in Greenland and Antarctica have been observed to generate seismic events of magnitude 5 or larger. Extremely large icebergs can also generate seismic signals that are observable at distances up to thousands of kilometers when they collide or grind across the ocean floor. Basal glacial motion can be enhanced due to water accumulation underneath a glacier sourced from surface or basal ice melt. Hydraulic pressure of subglacial water can reduce the friction at the bed, allowing the glacier to suddenly shift and generate seismic waves. This type of cryoseism can be very brief, or may last for many minutes.

=== Location ===
==== United States ====
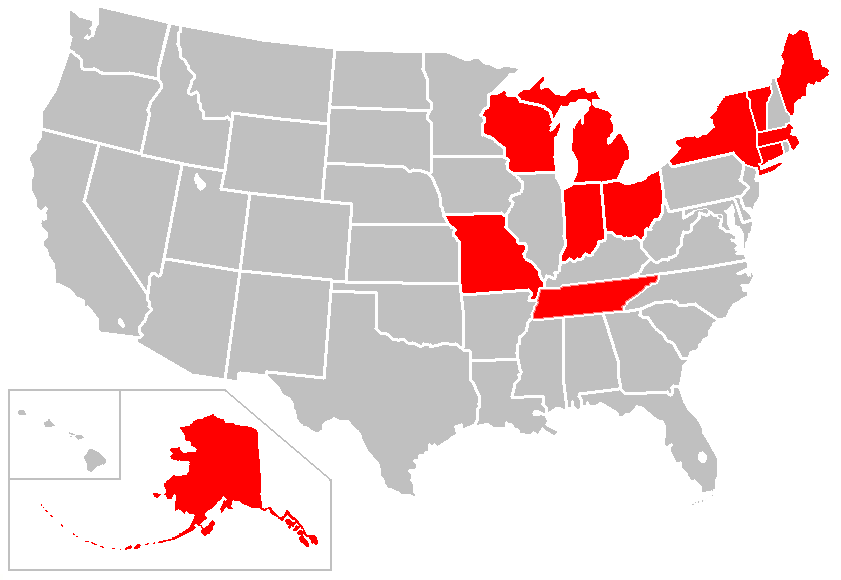
US States with reported cryoseisms

Geocryological processes were identified as a possible cause of tremors as early as 1818. In the United States, such events have been reported throughout the Midwestern, Northern and Northeastern United States.

On January 26, 2026 a record breaking winter storm had swept through Middle Tennessee. The storm started as a period of snow in the early morning of Saturday, January 24, 2026. By Monday, ice buildup up had reached 0.8 in some areas. That evening, temperatures rapidly dropped over 20 °F by midnight statewide. Frost quakes were felt and reported by thousands of Tennesseans as well as part of Southern Kentucky.

==== Canada ====
Cryoseisms also occur in Canada, especially along the Great Lakes/St. Lawrence corridor, where winter temperatures can shift very rapidly. They have surfaced in Ontario, Quebec, Alberta and the Maritime Provinces.

==== Other places ====
Glacier-related cryoseism phenomena have been reported in Alaska, Greenland, Iceland (Grímsvötn), Finland, Ross Island, and the Antarctic Prince Charles Mountains.

=== Precursors ===
There are four main precursors for a frost quake cryoseism event to occur:

1. A region must be susceptible to cold air masses
2. The ground must undergo saturation from thaw or liquid precipitation prior to an intruding cold air mass
3. Most frost quakes are associated with minor snow cover on the ground without a significant amount of snow to insulate the ground (i.e., less than 6 inches (15 cm))
4. A rapid temperature drop from approximately freezing to near or below −18 °C (0 °F), which ordinarily occurred on a timescale of 16 to 48 hours.

Cryoseisms typically occur when temperatures rapidly decrease from above freezing to below freezing (0 °C or 32 °F), and are more than likely to occur between midnight and dawn (during the coldest parts of night). However, due to the permanent nature of glacial ice, glacier-related cryoseisms may also occur in the warmer months of summer. In general, cryoseisms may occur 3 to 4 hours after significant changes in temperature. Perennial or seasonal frost conditions involved with cryoseisms limit these events to temperate climates that experience seasonal variation with subzero winters. Additionally, the ground must be saturated with water, which can be caused by snowmelt, rain, sleet or flooding. Geologically, areas of permeable materials like sand or gravel, which are susceptible to frost action, are likelier candidates for cryoseisms. Following large cryoseisms, little to no seismic activity will be detected for several hours, indicating that accumulated stress has been relieved.

== See also ==
- Cryosphere
- Glacial earthquake
- Glacial lake outburst flood
