= Glacial earthquake =

Type of earthquake occurring from glacial activity

Glacial earthquakes refer to a type of seismic event, with a magnitude of about 5, resulting from glacial calving events. The majority of glacial earthquake activity can be seen in the late summer and are found in Antarctica, Alaska, and Greenland. About 90% of these occur in Greenland. Glacial earthquakes occur most frequently in July, August, and September in Greenland. Seismographs are analyzed by scientists to identify and locate glacial earthquakes.

== Discovery ==
Since glacial earthquakes produce large amplitude and long period waves that deviate from traditional tectonic earthquake activity, glacial earthquakes require different monitoring methods. This is a primary reason why the specific class of glacial earthquakes was not discovered until 2003. Additionally, glacial earthquakes differ from tectonic earthquakes by lasting longer; for example, a tectonic earthquake with a magnitude of 5 may last 5 seconds, while a glacial earthquake with a magnitude of 5 may last 30 seconds.

== Measurement and detection ==
Current and past global seismic data is analyzed using an earthquake detection algorithm explained in a 2006 paper by Goran Ekstrom. The algorithm uses information from seismometers to detect and locate seismic activity by interpreting surface wave propagation and various factors of the seismographs.

Glacial earthquake magnitude can be calculated using teleseismic Rayleigh waves amplitudes. Using this method the magnitude ranges from 4.6 to 5.1 MSW.

== Causes ==
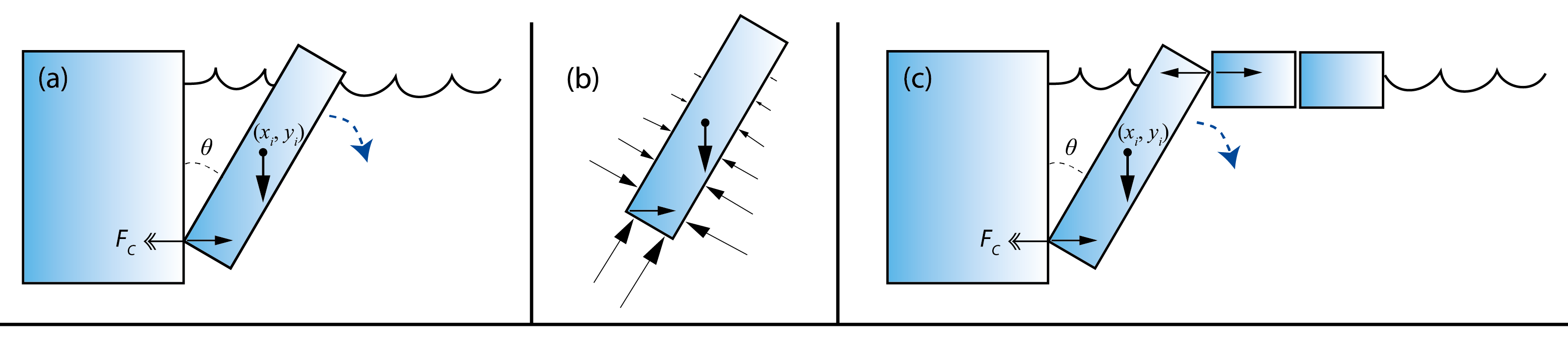
Process of iceberg calving

Seismic activity is seen in glacial environments due to processes such as stick-slip sliding, and the cracking and falling of ice sheets. A study conducted in 2015 connects this seismic activity to the movement of both ice sheets and the Earth in the event of calving. Calving events occur when ice chunks break off the end of a glacier. When ice chunks break off and fall into the ocean, a large force is generated. This force can last for a couple of minutes and pushes the glacier the ice chunk originated from back and down. This is followed by a rapid rebound. This motion and movement of both ice chunks and Earth material creates signals that alert to glacial seismic activity.

Seismic waves are also generated by the Whillans Ice Stream, a large, fast-moving river of ice pouring from the West Antarctic Ice Sheet into the Ross Ice Shelf. Scientists found that each day, two seismic waves are released, each with strength equal to about a magnitude 7 earthquake. It can be seen from the data that in ten minutes the ice river moves about a half-meter and is then still for 12 hours, then moves about a half-meter again. To obtain this data, seismographs were used mostly in Antarctica, and some in Australia, about 6,400 kilometers away.

== Global warming ==
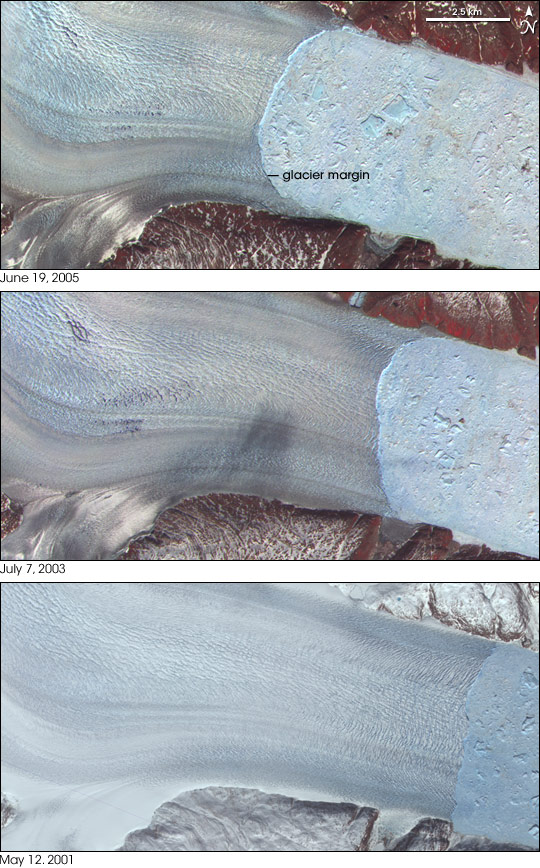
The Helheim Glacier in Greenland is being monitored to study glacial earthquakes.

A study done in the early 2000s suggests the number of glacial earthquakes are rising. Using data from January 1993 to October 2005, it was found that more earthquakes were identified each year since 2002 and in 2005, twice as many earthquakes were detected than any other year analyzed. It is possible that this increase could be due to global warming.

Glacial earthquakes could be used to better understand rates of ice loss and therefore monitor the severity of global warming. Calving events make up almost half of Greenland's ice sheet's annual mass loss. In 2015, data showed a sevenfold increase in glacial earthquakes in the past twenty years and they have been occurring more in the northern glaciers. This suggests an increase in the rates of ice loss through calving events.

== See also ==
- Cryoseism
- Earthquake
- Glacier
