= International Year of Glaciers' Preservation =

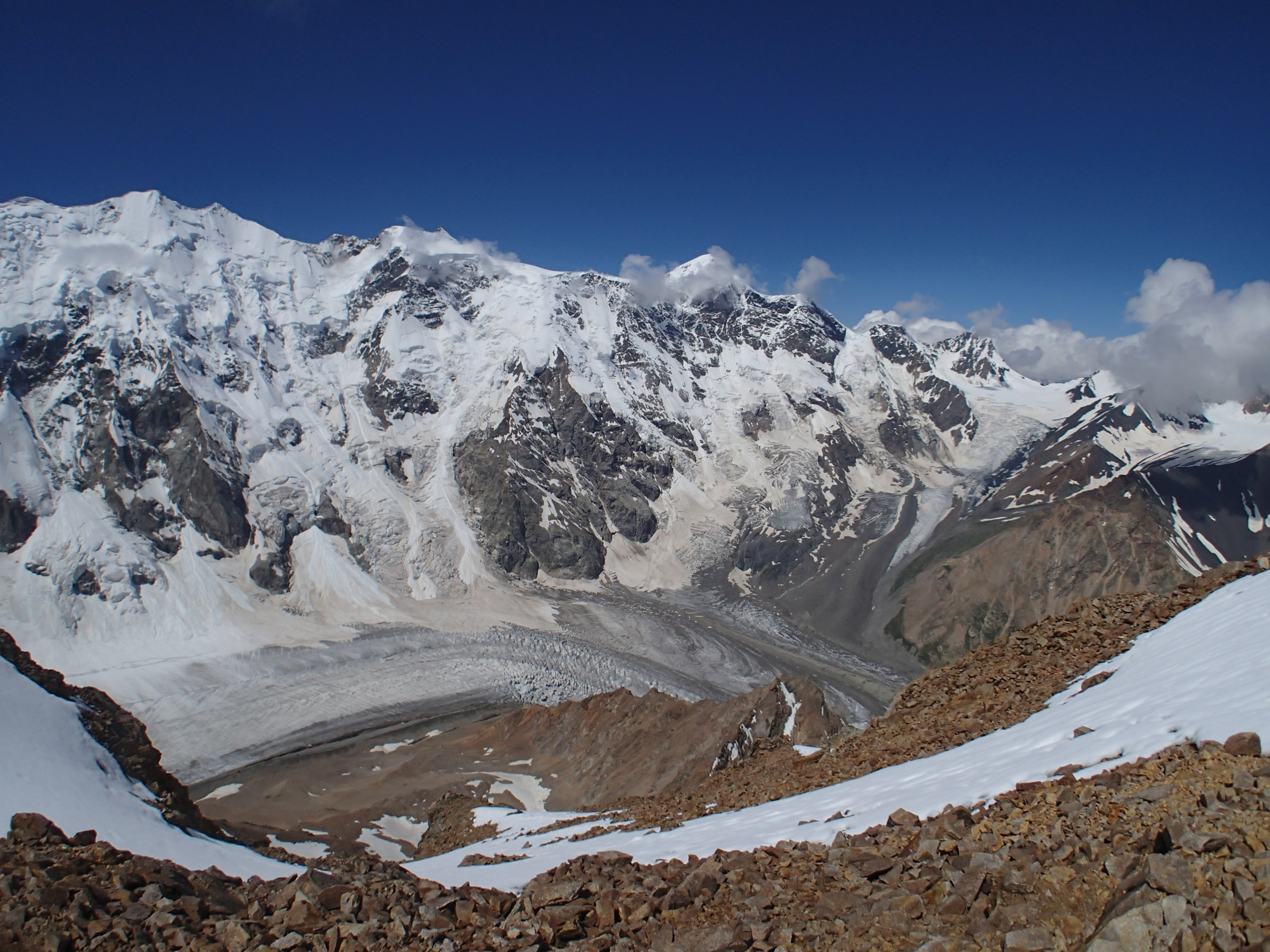
- A photo from the summit of Semenovskogo, a mountain in Southwest Russia. The photo shows a glacier.
- Date: 1 January – 31 December 2025
- Location: Worldwide
- Type: Exhibitions
- Website: www.un-glaciers.org/en

The year 2025 was declared the International Year of Glaciers' Preservation (IYGP2025) by the United Nations General Assembly to "highlight the importance of glaciers and ensure that those relying on them...receive the necessary.. services". The declaration was made at a request the mountainous country of Tajikistan made during 2022. Melting ice and glaciers threaten water security in many regions, including Tajikistan.

Objectives of the declaration include:

- Raising awareness of melting glaciers.
- Advocating changes in policy and sustainable measures to preserve glaciers.

This commemoration was co-facilitated by UNESCO and the World Meteorological Organization. The official launch took place on March 21, which is also now the World Day for Glaciers. The International Conference of Glaciers' Preservation took place from May 29—June 1, 2025 in Dushanbe, Tajikistan. The conference resulted in the Dushanbe Glacier Declaration that calls for:

- a worldwide inventory of existing perennial ice and snow masses
- promotion of integrated approaches for climate mitigation, adaptation and resilience
- strengthened cooperation and partnerships among scientific institutions and relevant stakeholders about mountain cryosphere monitoring and research
- promotion of availability of research results and findings to all stakeholders
- increasing climate finance to support vulnerable mountain and downstream communities.

There are more than 275,000 glaciers in the world, covering about 700,000 km², and storing about 170,000 km^{3} of ice. This adds up to about 70% of the global freshwater. Glaciers yield important information about ecosystem health and history because atmospheric gases are preserved within the layers of ice, offering a precise timeline of the history of Earth's atmosphere. The global sea-level rise of 20 cm from 1900 is partly a result of melting glaciers.

== Legacy ==
Following the declaration of the International Year for Glaciers' Preservation in December 2022, in August 2024 the United Nations General Assembly declared 2025-2034 the Decade of Action for Cryospheric Sciences. This new initiative further promotes the objectives stated in the declaration of the year of glacier preservation, urging policy change and promoting scientific research in the fields of glacier preservation and cryospheric research.
