= Basal sliding =

Movement of a glacier over its underlying meltwater

Basal sliding is the act of a glacier sliding over the bed due to meltwater under the ice acting as a lubricant. This movement very much depends on the temperature of the area, the slope of the glacier, the bed roughness, the amount of meltwater from the glacier, and the glacier's size.

The movement that happens to these glaciers as they slide is that of a jerky motion where any seismic events, especially at the base of glacier, can cause movement. Most movement is found to be caused by pressured meltwater or very small water-saturated sediments underneath the glacier. This gives the glacier a much smoother surface on which to move as opposed to a harsh surface that tends to slow the speed of the sliding. Although meltwater is the most common source of basal sliding, it has been shown that water-saturated sediment can also play up to 90% of the basal movement these glaciers make.

Most activity seen from basal sliding is within thin glacier that are resting on a steep slope, and this most commonly happens during the summer seasons when surface meltwater runoff peaks. Factors that can slow or stop basal sliding relate to the glacier's composition and also the surrounding environment. Glacier movement is resisted by debris, whether it is inside the glacier or under the glacier. This can affect the amount of movement that is made by the glacier by a large percentage especially if the slope on which it lies is low. The traction caused by this sediment can halt a steadily moving glacier if it interferes with the underlying sediment or water that was helping to carry it.

The Great Lakes were created due to basal erosion as a result of sliding over relatively weak bedrock.
