= List of presidents of the Canadian Geophysical Union =

Canadian Geophysical Union presidents

The list of presidents of the Canadian Geophysical Union is a list of all the past and present presidents of the Canadian Geophysical Union.

- 1974-1975 John Tuzo Wilson
- 1975-1977 Denis Ian Gough
- 1977-1979 Dave Strangway
- 1979-1981 Don Russell
- 1981-1983 Michael John Keen
- 1983-1985 Zoltan Hajnal
- 1985-1987 David J. Dunlop
- 1987-1989 Petr Vanicek
- 1989-1991 Douglas Edwin Smylie
- 1991-1993 Richard Peltier
- 1993-1995 Garry Clarke
- 1995-1997 Roy Hyndman
- 1997-1999 Larry Mayer
- 1999-2001 Terry Prowse
- 2001-2003 David Eaton
- 2003-2005 Philip Marsh
- 2005-2007 Gary Jarvis
- 2007-2009 John Pomeroy
- 2009-2011 Spiros Pagiatakis
- 2011-2013 Gail Atkinson
- 2013-2015 Brian Branfireun
- 2015-2017 Claire Samson
- 2017-2019 Richard Petrone
- 2019-2021 Carl Mitchell
- 2021-2023 Julian Lowman
- 2023-2025 Andrew Ireson
- 2025- Claire Oswald
