= List of works by Petr Vaníček =

This is the list of works by Petr Vaníček.

== Remarks ==
- B Book
- TB Textbook
- LN Lecture Notes
- PR Paper in a Refereed Journal
- R Research Paper
- C Critique, Reference Paper
- IP Invited Paper to a Meeting
- NP Paper Read at a Meeting
- TH Thesis
- RT Report (non-technical)
- RW Review Paper (technical)

== List of works ==
Nr	Type	Authors	Year	Title	Publisher	Language
1	TH, R	Vaníček, P.	1959	Use of triplets of stars in the method of equal altitudes.	Czech Technical University, Prague	Czech, Eng. thesis
2	TB	Pleskot, V., Culik, J., Kafka, J. and Vaníček, P.	1964	Basic Programming for Ural I.	SNTL, Prague	Czech
3	R, PR	Vaníček, P.	1964	Use of complex numbers for adjusting geodetic traverses. Aplikace Matematiky, No. 3, pp. 35–39,	NCSAV, Prague	Czech
4	TB	Culik, J., T. Hruskova, P. Vaníček	1965	Programming for Ural 2.	SNTL, Prague	Czech
5	R, PR	Kabelac, J., P. Vaníček	1965	Computation of deviations of vertical from astronomical observations using the method of equal altitudes, Travaux de l'Institute de Geophysique 1964, No. 197, pp. 41–65	NCSAV, Prague	
6	C, PR	Vaníček, P.	1965	Reference of J. Sutti's Paper, A Priori Exactitude in Reading on Nomograms.	Referativnij Zhurnal-Mathematika, Moscow	Russian
7	PR	Vaníček, P.	1965	Teaching computer programming and numerical analysis in the University of Paris. Vysoka Skola, No. 7, pp. 7–12	SPN, Prague	Czech
8	TH, R	Vaníček, P.	1967	Unharmonic analysis and its applications in geophysics. Ph.D. dissertation	Czechoslovak Academy of Sciences, Prague	Czech
9	IP, R	Vaníček, P.	1968	Unharmonic analysis of the drift of horizontal pendulums.	International Symposium Exchange of Experience with Tiltmeter Observations and a Critical Analysis of their Physical Significance, Moscow	Russian
10	R, PR	Vaníček, P.	1969	Approximate spectral analysis by least-squares fit.	Astroph. and Sp. Sci., Vol. 4, pp. 387–39l	
11	R, PR	Vaníček, P.	1969	New analysis of the earth pole wobble.	Studia Geoph. et Geod., Vol. 13, pp. 225–230.	
12	NP, R	Lennon, G. W., P. Vaníček	1969	Calibration tests and the comparative performance of horizontal pendulums at a single station.	Proc. of 6th Int. Symp. on Earth Tides, Strasbourg, pp. 183–193.	
13	NP, R	Vaníček, P.	1969	Theory of motion of horizontal pendulum with a Zollner suspension	Proc. 6th Int. Symp. on Earth Tides, Strasbourg, pp. 180–182	
14	NP, R	Vaníček, P.	1969	An analytical technique to minimize noise in a search for lines in the low frequency spectrum	Proc. of 6th Int. Symp. on Earth Tides, Strasbourg, pp. 170–173	
15	IP, R	Quraishee, G. S., P. Vaníček	1970	A search for low frequencies in residual tide and mean sea level observations by means of the least-squares spectral analysis	Rep. on Symp. on Coastal Geodesy, Munich, pp. 485–493	
16	NP, R	Vaníček, P.	1970	Spectral analysis by least-squares fit	51st An. Meet. of AGU, Washington	
17	LN	Vaníček, P.	1971	Introduction to adjustment calculus	Department of Surveying Engineering Lecture Notes, University of New Brunswick, Fredericton	
18	R, PR	Vaníček, P.	1971	Further development and properties of the spectral analysis by least-squares	Astroph. and Sp. Scie., Vol. 12, pp. 10–33	
19	IP, R	Vaníček, P.	1971	Spectral analysis by least-squares fit	IUGG meeting, Moscow	
20	LN	Vaníček, P.	1971	Physical Geodesy 1	Department of Surveying Engineering Lecture Notes 21, University of New Brunswick, Fredericton	Also translated to Spanish as Geodesia Fisica Aplicada, tomo I. 1980, Secretaria de programacion y presupuesto, Detenal, Mexico, DF (several editions).
21	NP, R	Gregerson, L. F., G. Symonds, P. Vaníček,	1971	Reports on experiments with a gyroscope equipped with electronic registration	IUGG meeting, Moscow	
22	NP, R	Gregerson, L. F., G. Symonds, P. Vaníček,	1971	Reports on experiments with a gyroscope equipped with electronic registration	FIG Meeting, Wiesbaden	
23	R, PR	Vaníček, P.	1971	An attempt to determine long-periodic variations in the drift of horizontal pendulums	Studia Geoph. et Geod., Vol. 15, pp. 416–420	
24	C, PR	Vaníček, P.	1971	Critique of M. Romanowski's "The Theory of Random Errors Based on the Concept of Modulated Normal Distribution."	The Canadian Surveyor, Vol. 25, pp. 467–468	
25	R, PR	Vaníček, P., G. W. Lennon,	1972	The theory of motion of the horizontal pendulum with a Zollner suspension	Studia Geoph. et Geod., Vol. 16, pp. 30–50	
26	R, PR	Vaníček, P.	1972	Dynamical aspects of suspended gyro-compass	The Canadian Surveyor, Vol. 26, pp. 72–83	
27	R	Vaníček, P., J. D. Boal, T. A. Porter	1972	Proposed new system of heights for Canada	Surveys and Mapping Branch Report No. 72-3, Ottawa	
28	R, PR	Vaníček, P., A. C. Hamilton	1972	Further analysis of vertical crustal movement observations in the Lac St. Jean area, Quebec	Can. J. of Earth Sci., Vol. 9, pp. 1139–1147	
29	LN	Vaníček, P.	1972	Brief outline of the Molodenskij theory	Department of Surveying Engineering Lecture Notes 23, University of New Brunswick, Fredericton	
30	LN	Vaníček, P.	1972	Physical geodesy II	Department of Surveying Engineering Lecture Notes 24, University of New Brunswick, Fredericton	Also translated into Spanish as Geodesia Fisica Applicade, tomo II, 1978. Secretaria de programacion y presupuesto, Detenal, Mexico, DF (several editions).
31	LN	Vaníček, P.	1972	The earth-pole wobble	Department of Surveying Engineering Lecture Notes 25, University of New Brunswick, Fredericton	
32	LN	Vaníček, P., D. E. Wells	1972	The least-squares approximation and related topics	Department of Surveying Engineering Lecture Notes 22, University of New Brunswick, Fredericton	
33	LN	Vaníček, P.	1972	Tensors	Department of Surveying Engineering Lecture Notes 27, University of New Brunswick, Fredericton	
34	R, PR	Merry, C. L., P. Vaníček	1973	Horizontal control and the geoid in Canada	The Canadian Surveyor, Vol. 27, pp. 23–31	
35	R	Vaníček, P., D. Woolnough	1973	A programme package for packing and generalising digital cartographic data	Department of Surveying Engineering Technical Report 23, University of New Brunswick, Fredericton	
36	NP, R	Merry, C.L., P. Vaníček	1973	Computation of the geoid from deflections of vertical using a least-squares surface fitting technique	54th Ann. Meeting of AGU, Washington	
37	NP	Vaníček, P., C. L. Merry	1973	The influence of geoid-ellipsoid separation on the Canadian horizontal control	CIS Annual Meeting, Ottawa	
38	R, PR	Vaníček, P., C. L. Merry	1973	Determination of the geoid from deflections of vertical using a least-squares surface fitting technique	Bulletin Géodésique, No. 109, pp. 261–279	
39	LN	Vaníček, P.	1973	Gravimetric satellite geodesy	Department of Surveying Engineering Lecture Notes 32, University of New Brunswick, Fredericton	
40	LN	Vaníček, P.	1973	The earth tides	Department of Surveying Engineering Lecture Notes 36, University of New Brunswick, Fredericton	
41	PR	Krakiwsky, E. J., P. Vaníček, L. A. Gale, A. C. Hamilton	1973	Objectives and philosophy of the International Symposium on Problems Related to the Redefinition of North American Networks	The Canadian Surveyor, Vol. 27, p. 246	
42	IP, R	Vaníček, P.	1973	Use of relevelling in small regions for vertical crustal movement determination	3rd GEOP Conference, Columbus, Ohio	
43	LN	Vaníček, P.	1973	Introduction of adjustment calculus (2nd rev. ed.)	Department of Surveying Engineering Lecture Notes 35, University of New Brunswick, Fredericton	Also translated into Spanish.
44	R, PR	Merry, C. L., P. Vaníček,	1974	The geoid and translation components	The Canadian Surveyor, Vol. 28, pp. 56–62	
45	C, PR	Vaníček, P., E. J. Krakiwsky,	1974	Letter to the editor	The Canadian Surveyor, Vol. 28, pp. 91–92	
46	IP, RW	Krakiwsky, E. J., P. Vaníček,	1974	Geodetic research needed for the redefinition of the size and shape of Canada	Symposium Geodesy for Canada, pp. A1-A17	
47	R	Merry, C. L., P. Vaníček,	1974	A method for astrogravimetric geoid determination	Department of Surveying Engineering Technical Report 27, University of New Brunswick, Fredericton	
48	NP, R, PR	Vaníček, P., D. E. Wells,	1974	Positioning of horizontal geodetic datums	The Canadian Surveyor, Vol. 28, No. 5, pp. 531–538	
49	NP, R, PR	Merry, C. L., P. Vaníček,	1974	A technique for determining the geoid from a combination of astrogeodetic and gravimetric deflections	The Canadian Surveyor, Vol. 28, No. 5, pp. 549–554	
50	IP, RW	Vaníček, P.	1974	Present status and the future of geodesy in Canada	First CGU Meeting, St. John's	
51	R, PR	Vaníček, P., D. Christodulides	1974	A method for evaluating vertical crustal movements from scattered geodetic relevellings	Canad. J. of Earth Sci., Vol. 11(5): 605-610	
52	R, PR	Thomson, D.B., P. Vaníček	1974	Note on reduction of spatial distances to a reference ellipsoid	The Survey Review, XXII, pp, 1-4	
53	R	Chrzanowski, A., A.C. Hamilton, E.J. Krakiwsky, P. Vaníček	1974	An evaluation of the geodetic networks in Ontario	Research report prepared for the Ministry of Natural Resources, Province of Ontario, Toronto	
54	B	Vaníček, P. (ed)	1974	Proceedings of the International Symposium on Problems Related to the Redefinition of North American Geodetic Networks	Fredericton, May, CIS, Ottawa	
55	R	Vaníček, P., A. Chrzanowski, E. J. Krakiwsky, A. C. Hamilton	1974	A critical review of alternatives with respect to the geodetic system of the Maritime Provinces	Research report prepared for the Land Registration and Information Service, Fredericton	
56	RT	Vaníček, P.	1975	Contribution to Geosciences in Canada (Geodesy)	Canadian Geoscience Council, 1974	
57	NP, R, PR	Vaníček, P.	1975	Vertical crustal movements in Nova Scotia as determined from scattered geodetic relevellings	Tectonophysics, 29, pp. 183–189	
58	R	Vaníček, P.	1975	Report on geocentric and geodetic datums	Department of Surveying Engineering Technical Report 32, University of New Brunswick, Fredericton	
59	R	Nassar, M.M., P. Vaníček	1975	Levelling and gravity	Department of Surveying Engineering Technical Report 33, University of New Brunswick, Fredericton	
60	RT	Krakiwsky, E.J., P. Vaníček (eds)	1975	Geodesy in Canada 1971-1974	Canadian national report to IAG, Canadian National Committee for IUGG	
61	PR	Wells, D. E., P. Vaníček	1975	Alignment of geodetic and satellite coordinate systems to the average terrestrial system	Bulletin Géodésique, 117, pp. 241–257	
62	R	Hamilton, A. C., A. Chrzanowski, P. Vaníček	1975	A critical review of existing and possible map projection systems for the Maritime Provinces	Research report prepared for the Land Registration and Information Service, Fredericton	
63	NP	Hamilton, A. C., A. Chrzanowski, P. Vaníček, R. Castonguay	1975	Map projections, grid coordinates, and geo-codes	Commonwealth Survey Officers Conference, Cambridge	
64	R	Masry, S. E., P. Vaníček	1975	Deviation of camera rotations from LTN-51 inertial navigation systems	Department of Surveying Engineering Technical Report 34, University of New Brunswick, Fredericton	
65	R, PR	Vaníček, P., D. F. Woolnough	1975	Reduction of linear cartographic data based on generation of pseudo-hyperbolae	The Cartographic Journal, Vol. 12(2): 112-119	
66	LN	Vaníček, P.	1976	Physical geodesy	Department of Surveying Engineering Lecture Notes 43, University of New Brunswick, Fredericton	
67	B	Vaníček, P. (ed)	1976	Proceedings of the 1975 CGU Symposium of Satellite Geodesy and Geodynamics	Publications of the Earth Physics Branch No. 45, 3, Ottawa	
68	R, PR	Vaníček, P.	1976	Vertical crustal movements pattern in Maritime Canada	Canad. J. of Earth Sci., 13(5): 661-667	
69	IP, RW	Vaníček, P.	1976	Papel de la geodesia en la sociedad	Proceedings of Congreso Nacional de Fotogrametria, Fotointerpretacion y Geodesia, Mexico City, May	
70	RT	Vaníček, P.	1976	Contribution to Geosciences in Canada (Geodesy) 1976	Canadian Geoscience Council	
71	R	Vaníček, P.	1977	Vertical crustal movements in southern Ontario	Earth Physics Branch, Open File Report K10-77-12, Ottawa	
72	IP, R	Vaníček, P., M. M. Nassar, F.W. Young	1977	Vertical crustal movements and sea-level records	Annual Meeting of CGU, Vancouver	
73	R	Vaníček, P.	1977	Sea level variations in Maritime Canada	Research report prepared for the Geodetic Survey of Canada, Ottawa	
74	IP, RW, PR	P. Vaníček	1977	Geodesy and geophysics	IN: Proceedings of Geophysics in the Americas, Ottawa, September 1976, Eds. Tanner and Dence, Publications of the Earth Physics Branch No. 46, 3, pp. 45–48	Also translated into Spanish.
75	R, PR	Wells, D.E., P. Vaníček	1978	Least squares spectral analysis	Bedford Institute of Oceanography Report No. BI-R-78-8	
76	R, PR	Vaníček, P.	1978	To the problem of noise reduction in sea level records used in vertical crustal movement detection	Phys. Earth Plan. Int. 17, pp. 265–280	
77	R, IP, RT, PR	Vaníček, P., E. J. Krakiwsky	1978	Geodesy reborn	Proceedings of Annual Meeting of ACSM-ASP, Washington, February, pp. 369–373, Also in Surveying and Mapping, XXXVIII(1): 23-26	
78	IP, R	Vaníček, P.	1978	Contemporary vertical crustal movements in southern Ontario from geodetic data	AGU Annual Meeting, Miami, April	
79	NP, RT	Nagy, D., P. Vaníček	1978	Preparation of contemporary vertical crustal movement map of Canada: A progress report	CGU Annual Meeting, London, Ontario, May	
80	R	Anderson, E., P. Vaníček	1978	Suggestions relating to the classification, accuracy, and execution of vertical control surveys	Research report prepared for the Geodetic Survey of Canada, Ottawa	
81	IP, RW	Vaníček, P.	1978	Earthquake prediction: Some myths and facts	IXth World Congress, S.V.U., Cleveland, Ohio, October	
82	IP, RW	Vaníček, P.	1978	Gravity needs in geodesy	Contribution to U.S. National Academy of Science Workshop on Gravity Satellites, Washington, D.C., November	
83	R, PR	Vaníček, P., M. Elliott, R. O. Castle	1979	Four dimensional modelling of recent vertical movements in the area of the southern California uplift	Tectonophysics, 52, pp. 287–300.	
84	R, RW, PR	Lambert, A., P. Vaníček	1979	Contemporary crustal movements in Canada	Canad. J. of Earth Sci., 16(3, part 2): 647–668.	
85	IP, RT	Vaníček, P.	1979	Vertical crustal movements—Terrestrial techniques	GEOP-9 Conference (Session Leader's Report), EOS, Transactions of AGU, 60(28): 524.	
86	PR	Vaníček, P.	1979	Tensor structure and the least squares	Bulletin Géodésique, 53, pp. 221–225.	
87	NP	Nagy, D., P. Vaníček	1979	Map of contemporary vertical crustal movements in Canada	6th Annual Meeting CGU, Fredericton.	
88	NP	Steeves, R.R., P. Vaníček	1979	Earth tide tilt observations at UNB	6th Annual Meeting CGU, Fredericton.	
89	RT	Vaníček, P.	1979	UNB contribution to Canadian National Report for IAG	Canberra, Australia.	
90	PR	Vaníček, P.	1979	Sixth annual meeting of Canadian Geophysical Union	Geoscience Canada 6(4): 216–217.	
91	PR	Vaníček, P.	1979	Dr. E.J. Krakiwsky leaves the University of New Brunswick for the University of Calgary	The Canadian Surveyor, 33(4): 396.	
92	NP	Anderson, E. G., P. Vaníček	1979	Redefinition of the vertical geodetic network in Canada	IUGG General Assembly, Canberra.	
93	B, IP, RW	Vaníček, P.	1980	Inertial technology in surveying	In: Notes for CIS Regional Geodetic Seminars, ed. G. Lachapelle, CIS, Ottawa, pp. 103–120.	
94	R, RT	Vaníček, P., D. Nagy	1980	Report on the compilation of the map of vertical crustal movements in Canada	Earth Physics Branch, Open File Report No. 80-2, Ottawa.	
95	R, PR	Vaníček, P., E. W. Grafarend	1980	On the weight estimation in levelling	NOAA Technical Report, NOS 86 NGS 17.	
96	R, RW, PR	Vaníček, P., R. O. Castle, E. I. Balazs	1980	Geodetic levelling and its applications	Reviews of Geophysics and Space Physics, 18(2): 505–524, Reprinted in Advances in Geodesy, eds. E.W. Grafarend and R.M. Rapp, AGU, Washington, 1984.	
97	R, PR	Vaníček, P.	1980	Tidal corrections to geodetic quantities	NOAA Technical Report, NOS 83 NGS 14, p. 30.	
98	R, PR	Vaníček, P., D. Nagy	1980	The map of contemporary vertical crustal movements in Canada	EOS, Transactions of AGU, 61(4): 145–147.	
99	C, PR	Vaníček, P.	1980	Review of "Proceedings of First International Conference on the Redefinition of the North American Geodetic Vertical Control Network"	EOS, Transactions of AGU, 61(21): 467.	
100	NP	Vaníček, P.	1980	Heights based on observed gravity	Proceedings of the Second International Symposium on Problems Related to the Redefinition of North American Vertical Geodetic Networks, Ottawa, May, pp. 553–566.	
101	NP	Castle, R. O. and P. Vaníček,	1980	Interdisciplinary considerations in the formulation of the new North American vertical datum.	Proceedings of the Second International Symposium on Problems Related to the Redefinition of North American Vertical Geodetic Networks, Ottawa, May, pp. 285–300.	
102	IP	Vaníček, P.	1980	Vertical positioning—the state of the art.	AGU/CGU Spring Meeting, Toronto.	
103	NP	Thapa, K., P. Vaníček	1980	A study of the effect of individual observations in horizontal geodetic networks.	AGU/CGU Spring Meeting, Toronto.	
104	NP	Delikaraoglou, D., D. E. Wells, P. Vaníček	1980	Analysis of GEOS-3 altimetry in Hudson Bay.	AGU/CGU Spring Meeting, Toronto (abstract: EOS, Transactions of the American Geophysical Union, 61, p. 208).	
105	R	Vaníček, P.	1980	Investigation of some problems related to the redefinition of Canadian levelling networks.	Department of Surveying Engineering Technical Report 72, University of New Brunswick, Fredericton.	
106	IP	Vaníček, P.	1980	How artificial satellites, the moon, and quasars help us learn more about the shape of the earth.	Xth World Congress, S.V.U., Washington, October.	
107	NP, PR	Vaníček, P. and D. Nagy	1981	On the compilation of the map of contemporary vertical crustal movements in Canada.	Tectonophysics, 71, pp. 75–87.	
108	NP	Wells, D. E., D. Delikaraoglou, P. Vaníček	1981	Navigating with the Global Positioning System, today and in the future.	Presented at 74th Annual Meeting of CIS, St. John's, May.	
109	R	Wells, D. E., P. Vaníček, D. Delikaraoglou	1981	Pilot study of the application of NAVSTAR/GPS to geodesy in Canada.	Research report for the Geodetic Survey of Canada. Department of Surveying Engineering Technical Report 76, University of New Brunswick, Fredericton.	
110	R, PR	Vaníček, P., K. Thapa, D. Schneider	1981	The use of strain to identify incompatible observations and constraints in horizontal geodetic networks.	Manuscripta Geodaetica, 6(3): 257–281.	
111	C, PR	Vaníček, P.	1981	Review of "Fundamental Principles of General Relativity Theories".	Manuscripta Geodaetica, 6(2): 245.	
112	C, PR	Vaníček, P.	1981	Review of "Earth History and Plate Tectonics."	Manuscripta Geodaetica, 6(2): 245–246.	
113	R	Merry, C. L., P. Vaníček	1981	The zero frequency response of sea level to meteorological influences.	Department of Surveying Engineering Technical Report 82, University of New Brunswick, Fredericton, 83 pages.	
114	IP	Vaníček, P.	1981	Recent shifts in the geodetic perception of the role of the earth's gravity field.	Fall Meeting of AGU, San Francisco, December.	
115	PR	Vaníček, P.	1981	Statement of intent for the election to presidency of AGU geodesy section.	EOS, Transactions of AGU, 62(50): 1186.	
116	TB	Vaníček, P., E. J. Krakiwsky,	1982	Geodesy: The Concepts.	North-Holland, Amsterdam, 691 pages.	
117	R, PR	Wells, D. E., D. Delikaraoglou, P. Vaníček	1982	Marine navigation with NAVSTAR/GPS today and in the future.	The Canadian Surveyor, 36(1): 9-28.	
118	R, PR	Vaníček, P.	1982	To the problem of holonomity of height systems.	Letter to the editor, The Canadian Surveyor, 36(1): 122–123.	
119	IP, PR, R, RT	Vaníček, P., A. C. Hamilton	1982	Do geodesy and digital cartography belong in the conceptual model for integrated surveying and mapping?	Proceedings of the 42nd Annual Meeting of ACSM, Denver, March, pp. 289–296.	
120	R, NP	Dare P., P. Vaníček	1982	Strength analysis of horizontal networks using strain.	Proceedings of Meeting of FIG Study Group 5B, (Survey Control Networks), Aalborg, July, pp. 181–196.	
121	NP	Carrera, G., P. Vaníček	1982	Effect of reference ellipsoid misalignment on deflection components and geodetic azimuth.	Presented to Congreso National de Fotogrametria, Fotointerpretacion y Geodesia, Mexico City, September.	
122	C, PR	Vaníček, P.	1982.	Review of "Multidisciplinary Approach to Earthquake Prediction".	Manuscripta Geodaetica, 8(1): 80.	
123	R	Davidson, D. D. Delikaraoglou, R. B. Langley, B. Nickerson, P. Vaníček and D. E. Wells	1982	Global Positioning System: Differential positioning simulations.	Department of Surveying Engineering Technical Report 90, University of New Brunswick, Fredericton, 141 pages.	
124	IP	Vaníček, P.	1982	Is sea level really level?	Congress S.V.U., Pittsburgh, October.	
125	IP	Vaníček, P.	1982	Geometrical strength analysis: A tool for assessment of geodetic networks.	Presented to Fifth UN Regional Cartographic Conference for Africa, Cairo.	
126	B, IP, RW	Blais, J. A. R. and P. Vaníček	1983	Overview of advanced estimation methods in surveying.	In: Notes for CIS Adjustments Seminar, ed. E.J. Krakiwsky, CIS, Ottawa, pp. 308–350.	
127	PR, R, NP	Merry, C. L., P. Vaníček	1983	Investigation of local variation of sea surface topography.	IAG Symposium on Marine Geodesy, Tokyo, May. Marine Geodesy, 7(1-4): 101–126.	
128	PR, R	Dare, P., P. Vaníček,	1983	The use of strain in the design of horizontal networks.	Geodeszja #79, Akademia Gorniczo-Hutnicza, Kraków, pp. 133–144.	
129	TB	Vaníček, P., M. Craymer	1983	Autocorrelation functions as a diagnostic tool in levelling.	In H. Pelzer and W. Niemeier (editors), Precise Levelling, Dummler Verlag, Bonn, pp. 327–341.	
130	R, NP	Delikaraoglou, D., D. Davidson, R. B. Langley, B. G. Nickerson, P. Vaníček, D. E. Wells	1983	Geodetic baseline accuracies from differential GPS observations.	Spring Meeting of AGU, Baltimore, May–June (abstract: EOS, Transactions of the American Geophysical Union, 64, p. 210).	
131	RP	Lachapelle, G., P. Vaníček, (eds).	1983	Geodesy, gravity and geodynamics in Canada.	Canadian Quadriannual Report to IAG, Hamburg, August, 87 pages.	
132	R, NP	Wells, D. E., D. A. Davidson, D. Delikaraoglou, R. B. Langley, B. G. Nickerson, P. Vaníček	1983	The comparative accuracies of Global Positioning System differential positioning modes.	Proceedings of the IAG Symposium on The Future of Terrestrial and Space Methods for Positioning, Hamburg, August. The Ohio State University, Columbus, Vol. 2, pp. 192–221.	
133	IP	Vaníček, P.	1983	Geodetic symbiosis of the developed and developing countries.	Proceedings of IAG Symposium on Strategy for Solving Geodetic Problems in Developing Countries, Hamburg, August, Vol. 2, pp. 597–605.	
134	IP, R	Vaníček, P., D. E. Wells, A. Chrzanowski, A. C. Hamilton, R. B. Langley, J. D. McLaughlin, B. G. Nickerson	1983	The future of geodetic networks.	Proceedings of the IAG Symposium on the Future of Terrestrial and Space Methods for Positioning, Hamburg, August. The Ohio State University, Columbus, Oh, Vol. 2, pp. 372–379.	Also translated into Polish as "Przyszlosc sieci geodezyjnych", Przeglad Geodezyjny, 1984, LVI(8-9): 5–7.
135	NP, R	Vaníček, P., S. John,	1983	Evaluation of geoid solutions for Canada using different kinds of data.	Proceedings of IAG Symposium on Improved Gravity Field Estimations on Global Basis, Hamburg, August, Vol. 2, pp. 609–624.	
136	IP, R	Vaníček, P.	1983	Diagrammatic approach to adjustment calculus.	Proceedings of T. Banachiewic's Commemorative Conference on Development of Theory and Techniques of Astronomical and Geodetic Calculations, Kraków, May. Geodezja #86, Akademia Gorniczo-Hutnicza, 1986, pp. 28–39.	
137	LN	Vaníček, P.	1983	Transit satellite positioning.	Lecture notes for UNDP graduate course in geodesy for East Africa. Regional Centre for Services in Surveying, Mapping and Remote Sensing, Nairobi, Kenya, July, p. 21.	
138	PR, R	Vaníček, P., M. Craymer	1983	Autocorrelation functions in the search for systematic errors in levelling.	Manuscripta Geodaetica, 8(4): 321–341.	
139	PR, R	Vaníček, P., R. B. Langley, D. E. Wells, D. Delikaraoglou	1984	Geometrical aspects of differential GPS positioning.	Bulletin Géodésique, 58, pp. 37–52.	
140	NP, RW	Carrera, G., P. Vaníček	1984	Review of techniques for determining vertical crustal movements from levelling data.	Proceedings of Third International Symposium on Land Subsidence, Venice, March, pp. 195–202.	
141	R, NP	Pagiatakis, S. D., R. B. Langley, P. Vaníček	1984	Ocean tide loading: A global model for the analysis of VLBI observations.	Proceedings of the Third International Symposium on the Use of Artificial Satellites for Geodesy and Geodynamics, Ermioni, Greece, September, 1982, pp. 328–340.	
142	IP	Vaníček, P., G. Beutler, A. Chrzanowski, W. Faig, R. Langley, J. McLaughlin, D. E. Wells,	1984	Implications of new space techniques in land surveying.	Presented at Annual Meeting of CIS, Quebec City, May.	Also translated into Polish as "Wplyw rozwoju metod kosmicznych na pomiary terenowe". Przeglad Geodezyjny, 1984 LVI(11): 10–11.
143	R	Langley, R. B., G. Beutler, D. Delikaraoglou, B. G. Nickerson, R. Santerre, P. Vaníček, D. E. Wells	1984	Studies in the application of the Global Positioning System to differential positioning.	Department of Surveying Engineering Technical Report 108, University of New Brunswick, Fredericton, 201 pages.	
144	NP, R	Lugoe, F., P. Vaníček	1984	Strain effect of an existing (densified) network on a densification network.	Spring Meeting of AGU, Cincinnati, May.	
145	NP, R	Beutler, G., D. A. Davidson, R. B. Langley, R. Santerre, H.D. Valliant, P. Vaníček, D.E. Wells	1984	The Ottawa Macrometer™ experiment: An independent analysis.	Annual Meeting of CGU (CGU/CMOS), Halifax, May–June.	
146	IP, RW	Carrera, G., P. Vaníček	1984	The wide use of tide gauge observations in geodesy.	Annual Meeting of CGU (CGU/CMOS), Halifax, May–June.	
147	NP, R	Pagiatakis, D., P. Vaníček	1984	Analysis of tidal tilt and gravity measurements at the Fredericton earth tide station.	Annual Meeting of CGU (CGU/CMOS), Halifax, May–June.	
148	R	Carrera, G., R. C. Gunn, P. Tetrault, P. Vaníček	1984	Preliminary research for the geodetic monitoring of Ontario Hydro's Cornwall dyke.	Survey Science Technical Report 4, University of Toronto/Erindale College, Mississauga, 175 pages.	
149	R	Beutler, G., D. A. Davidson, R. B. Langley, R. Santerre, P. Vaníček, D. E. Wells	1984	Some theoretical aspects of geodetic positioning using carrier phase difference observations of GPS satellites.	Department of Surveying Engineering Technical Report 109, University of New Brunswick, Fredericton. Also Satellite Station Zimmerwald, University of Bern Astronomical Institute Technical Report 14, Bern, Switzerland, 79 pages.	
150	IP, R	Kleusberg, A., G. Beutler, D. Delikaraoglou, R. Langley, R. Santerre, R. Steeves, H. Valliant, P. Vaníček, D. Wells	1984	Comparison of Macrometer™ V-1000 and Texas Instruments 4100 GPS survey results.	AGU Fall Meeting, San Francisco, December (abstract: EOS Transactions of the American Geophysical Union, 65, p. 853).	
151	IP, RW	Vaníček, P.	1984	Sea level and vertical crustal movements.	AGU Chapman Conference on Vertical Crustal Motion, Harpers Ferry, WV, October.	
152	R, NP	Craymer, M., P. Vaníček	1984	Further analysis of the 1981 southern California field test for levelling refraction.	AGU Chapman Conference on Vertical Crustal Motion, Harpers Ferry, WV, October.	
153	RW, PR	Vaníček, P., G. Beutler, A. Chrzanowski, W. Faig, R. B. Langley, J. D. McLaughlin, D. E. Wells	1984	Implications of new space techniques in land surveying.	South African Journal, 19(6), pp. 32–36.	
154	PR, R	Vaníček, P., G. Carrera	1985	Reference ellipsoid misalignment, deflection components and geodetic azimuths.	The Canadian Surveyor, 39(2): 123–130.	
155	RW	Carrera, G., P. Vaníček	1985	The use of sea level tide gauge observations in geodesy.	Lighthouse, Journal of the Canadian Hydrographic Service, Ed. No. 31, May, pp. 13–15.	
156	R, NP	Carrera, G., P. Vaníček	1985	A temporal homogenization of the Canadian height network.	Proceedings of NAVD '85 Symposium, Rockville, MD, April, pp. 217–226.	
157	R, NP	Craymer, M., P. Vaníček	1985	An investigation of systematic errors in Canadian levelling lines.	Proceedings of NAVD '85 Symposium, Rockville, MD, April, pp. 441–450.	
158	R, NP	Vaníček, P., A. Kleusberg, R. B. Langley, R. Santerre, D. E. Wells	1985	On the elimination of biases in processing differential GPS observations.	Proceedings of the First International Symposium on Precise Positioning with GPS, Rockville, MD, April, Vol. I, pp. 315–324.	
159	R, NP	Kleusberg, A., R. B. Langley, R. Santerre, P. Vaníček, D. E. Wells, G. Beutler	1985	Comparison of survey results from different types of GPS receivers.	Proceedings of the First International Symposium on Precise Positioning with GPS, Rockville, MD, April, Vol. II, pp. 579–592.	
160	R, NP	Kleusberg, A., R. B. Langley, S. H. Quek, R. Santerre, P. Vaníček, D. E. Wells	1985	Experience with GPS at the University of New Brunswick.	12th Annual Meeting of CGU, Calgary, May (abstract: Geophysics, 50(8):1382-1383).	
161	RW, IP	Vaníček, P.	1985	Geodetic uses of and techniques to determine mean sea level.	Annual meeting of Geological Association of Canada, Fredericton, May.	
162	R, NP	Craymer, M., P. Vaníček, A. Tarvydas	1985	Rigorous updating of adjusted networks.	CIS Annual Meeting, Edmonton, May.	
163	R, NP	Kleusberg, A., P. Vaníček	1985	The geoid and how to get it.	CIS Annual Meeting, Edmonton, May.	
164	R	Vaníček, P., G. Carrera, M. Craymer	1985	Corrections for systematic errors in the Canadian levelling networks.	Survey Science Technical Report 10, University of Toronto/Erindale College, Mississauga. Also reprinted as Geodetic Survey of Canada Contract Report 85–0001, 128 pages.	
165	R	Vaníček, P., G. Beutler, A. Kleusberg, R. B. Langley, R. Santerre, D. E. Wells	1985	DIPOP: Differential Positioning Program package for the Global Positioning System.	Department of Surveying Engineering Technical Report 115, University of New Brunswick, Fredericton. Also reprinted as Geodetic Survey of Canada Contract Report 85-005.	
166	B	U.S. National Research Council (P. Vaníček one of the authors)	1985	Geodesy: A Look to the Future.	Committee on Geodesy, Commission on Physical Sciences, Mathematics and Resources; National Academy Press, Washington, 179 pages.	
167	R, NP	Inzinga, T., P.Vaníček	1985	A two-dimensional navigation algorithm using a probabilistic force field.	Proceedings of the Third International Symposium on Inertial Technology for Surveying and Geodesy, Banff, Alberta, September, pp. 241–255.	
168	R, NP	Pagiatakis, S., P. Vaníček	1985	Atmospheric perturbations on tidal tilt and gravity measurements at the UNB earth tides station.	Proceedings of the 10th International Symposium on Earth Tides, Madrid, September, pp. 905–922.	
169	R, NP	Langley, R. B., A. Kleusberg, D. Parrot, R. Santerre, P. Vaníček, D. E. Wells	1985	(Plans to do) DIPOP processing of observations from the spring 1985 GPS "bake-off".	Fall Annual Meeting of AGU, San Francisco, December (abstract: EOS, Transactions of the American Geophysical Union, 66(46) p. 844).	
170	R	Wells, D.E., P. Vaníček, S. Pagiatakis	1985	Least-squares spectral analysis revisited.	Department of Surveying Engineering Technical Report 84, University of New Brunswick, Fredericton, 68 pages.	
171	R, PR	Vaníček, P. and A. Kleusberg	1985	What an external gravitational potential can really tell us about mass distribution.	Bollettino di Geofisica Teorica ed Applicata, Vol. XXCII, No. 108, December, pp. 243–250.	
172	R, PR	Vaníček, P., F. N. Lugoe	1986	Rigorous densification of horizontal network.	Journal of Surveying Engineering, Vol. 112, No. 1, pp. 18–29.	
173	TB	Vaníček, P. and E. J. Krakiwsky	1986	Geodesy: The Concepts.	2nd rev. ed., North-Holland, Amsterdam, 697 pages.	Reprinted in China and in Iran.
174	R, NP	Langley, R. B., A. Kleusberg, R. Santerre, D. E. Wells, P. Vaníček	1986	DIPOP: An interactive software package for precise positioning with GPS.	ACSM/ISP Spring Annual Meeting, Washington.	
175	R	Vaníček, P., A. Kleusberg, R. G. Chang, H. Fashir, N. Christou, M. Hofman, T. Kling, T. Arsenault	1986	The Canadian Geoid.	Geodetic Survey of Canada; Energy, Mines and Resources Canada, Ottawa, Technical Report No.???. Also Department of Surveying Engineering, University of New Brunswick, Fredericton, Technical Report No. 129, pp. 123.	
176	R, NP	Vaníček, P., A. Kleusberg	1986	Canadian experience with heterogeneous geoid data combinations.	Presented to the IAG International Symposium on the Definition of the Geoid, Florence, Italy, May, Bolletino di Geodesia e Scienze Affini, XLV, No. 2, pp. 127–138.	
177	R	Vaníček, P., T. Arsenault, N. Christou, E. Derenyi, A. Kleusberg, S. Pagiatakis, D. E. Wells and R. Yazdani,	1986	Satellite altimetry applications for marine gravity.	Department of Surveying Engineering Technical Report No. 128, University of New Brunswick, Fredericton, pp. 184.	
178	NP	Parrot, D., R. B. Langley, A. Kleusberg, R. Santerre, P. Vaníček, D. Wells	1986	The spring 1985 GPS High-Precision Baseline Test: Very preliminary results.	Presented at the GPS Technology Workshop, Jet Propulsion Laboratory, Pasadena, CA, March.	
179	R, NP	Langley, R. B., D. Parrot, R. Santerre, P. Vaníček, D. E. Wells	1986	The Spring 1985 GPS high-precision baseline test: Preliminary analyses with DIPOP.	Proceedings of the Fourth International Geodetic Symposium on Satellite Positioning, University of Texas at Austin, Austin, TX, April, pp. 1073–1088.	
180	NP, R	Doucet, K., H. Janes, D. Delikaraoglou, D. E. Wells, R. B. Langley, P. Vaníček	1986	Examples of geodetic GPS network design.	Presented at joint Annual Meeting of Geological Association of Canada, Mineralological Association of Canada, and Canadian Geophysical Union, Ottawa, May.	
181	PR	Craymer, M. and P. Vaníček	1986	Further analysis of the 1981 southern California field test for levelling refraction."	Journal of Geophysical Research, Vol. 91, No. B9, August, pp. 9045-9055.	
182	R	Hamilton, A., D. Wells, A. Chrzanowski, W. Faig, R. Langley, P. Vaníček, J. McLaughlin	1986	Control survey study for LRIS.	Department of Surveying Engineering Technical Report No. 124, University of New Brunswick, Fredericton, 110 pages.	
183	NP, R	Vaníček, P.	1986	Are geodetic networks going to survive the space age?	Proceedings of Symposium on Geodetic Positioning for the Surveyor, University of Cape Town, Cape Town, South Africa, 8-9, September, pp. 63-70.	
184	NP, R	Vaníček, P.	1986	The accuracy of GPS-determined positions.	Proceedings of Symposium on Geodetic Positioning for the Surveyor, University of Cape Town, Cape Town, South Africa, 8-9, September, pp. 133-142.	
185		Vaníček, P.	1986	Letter to the Editor.	The Canadian Surveyor, Vol. 40, No. 1, p. 53.	
186	R	Janes, H., K. Doucet, B. Roy, D. E. Wells, R. B. Langley, P. Vaníček, M. Craymer	1986:	"GPSNET": A program for the interactive design of geodetic GPS networks.	Canadian Geodetic Survey Contract Report No. 0SZ85-00115, Canadian Engineering Surveys Co. Ltd., Edmonton, Alberta, 200 pages.	
187	TB	Guide to GPS Positioning	1986	Prepared under the leadership of D.E. Wells by N. Beck, D. Delikaraoglou, A. Kleusberg, E.J. Krakiwsky, G. Lachapelle, R. B. Langley, M. Nakiboglu, K.-P. Schwarz, J.M. Tranquilla, P. Vaníček, D.E. Wells.	Canadian GPS Associates 1986, 600 pages.	
188	IP	Vaníček, P.	1986	Gravimetric Geoid for Canada.	"Mathematical-geodetic methods for the determination of geoid and topography", Workshop organized by Geodetic Institute of University of Stuttgart, Lambrecht, FRG, October 1–3.	
189	R, PR	Vaníček, P. and A. Kleusberg,	1987	The Canadian geoid—Stokesian approach.	Manuscripta Geodaetica, 12(2), pp. 86–98.	
190	PR	Vaníček, P., and L. E. Sjöberg,	1987	A note on vertical crustal movement determination techniques.	Department of Geodesy, Royal Institute of Technology, Tech. Report No. 9, 15 pages.	
191	PR	Vaníček, P. (editor), P. A. Cross, J. Hannah, L. Hradilek, R. Kelm, J. Makinen, C. L. Merry, L. E. Sjoberg, R. R. Steeves, P. Vanicek, and D. B. Zilkoski	1987	Four-dimensional geodetic positioning	Report of the IAG SSG 4.96, Manuscripta Geodaetica, Vol. 12(3), pp. 147–222.	
192	IP	Vaníček, P.	1987	New technology helps geodesy to become useful for other earth sciences.	Presented at School of Geodesy "A. Marussi", Erice, Sicily, 15–25 June.	
193	IP	Vaníček, P.	1987	Satellite altimetry: Application to marine gravity determination.	Presented at School of Geodesy "A. Marussi", Erice, Sicily, 15–25 June.	
194	IP, NP	Vaníček, P.	1987	Impact of Post-Glacial Rebound on Positions.	Presented at the scientific meeting of IAG, Section V, Vancouver, August 12.	
195	IP, NP	Santerre, R., M. R. Craymer, A. Kleusberg, R.B. Langley, D. Parrot, S.H. Quek, P. Vaníček, D.E. Wells, F. Wilkins	1987	Precise Relative GPS Positioning with DIPOP 2.0.	Presented to: IAG Section II Scientific Meetings: "Advanced Space Technology", IUGG XIX General Assembly, Vancouver, 14 August.	
196	IP, NP	Craymer, M. R. and P. Vaníček,	1987	NETAN: A Program for the Interactive Analysis of Geodetic Networks.	Presented to: Session 2: Geodetic Networks, IAG Symposium GSI (Positioning), IUGG XIX General Assembly, Vancouver, B.C., 14 August.	
197	NP	Vaníček, P.	1987	Four-Dimensional Geodetic Positioning in Contributions to Geodetic Theory and Methodology,	Editor: K.-P. Schwarz, IAG, Section IV, p. 221-226.	
198	R	Vaníček, P., P. Tetreault and M. Goadsby,	1987	Use of GPS for the maintenance of Ontario networks	UofT, Survey Science, Tech. Rep. #12, 120 pages.	
199	IP, PR, R	Carrera, G. and P. Vaníček,	1988	A comparison of present sea level linear trends from tide gauges, map of crustal movements and radiocarbon curves in Eastern Canada,	Presented to XIIth Congress of INQUA, Ottawa, Aug. 7, Aug. 7, 1987. Palaeogeography, palaeoclimatology, palaeoecology, 68, pp. 127–134.	
200	B	Vaníček, P.	1988	Satellite Geodesy & Geodynamics	Contribution to "The Encyclopedia of Field and General Geology", Vol. XIV, edited by C.W. Finkl, Jnr. Van Nostrand Reinhold Company Inc., pp. 737–744.	
201	B	Vaníček, P.	1988	Guide to GPS Positioning	Prepared under the leadership of D. Wells by N. Beck, D. Delikaraoglou, A. Kleusberg, E.J. Krakiwsky, G. Lachapelle, R. B. Langley, M. Nakiboglu, K.-P Schwarz, J.M. Tranquilla, P. Vaníček, D.E. Wells. Canadian GPS Associates 1986, 600 pages. (second edition)	
202	NP	Christou, N., P. Vaníček and C. Ware	1988	Can the geoid add anything to our knowledge of the lithosphere?	Presented at 15th Annual Meeting CGU, Saskatoon, Sa, May.1988	
203	NP	Vaníček, P.	1988	Hiking and biking with GPS : The Canadian Perspective.	International GPS Workshop, Darmstadt, April 10–13. GPS-Techniques Applied to Geodesy and Surveying, Groten, E. and R. Strauss (editors), Springer's Lecture Notes in Earth Science #19, pp. 225–229.	
204	RW	Craymer, M. R. and P. Vaníček	1988	Sequential adjustment methods for the maintenance of geodetic networks	CISM Seminar on the Impact of NAD 83, CISM, pp. 243–262.	
205	IP	Vaníček, P. and M. Kwimbere	1988	Displacement versus strain.	Proceedings of 5th International Symposium on Deformation Surveys, Fredericton, June 6–9, pp. 557–562.	
206	NP	Carrera, G. and P. Vaníček	1988	Compilation of a new recent crustal movements map for Canada	Proceedings of 5th International Symposium on Deformation Surveys, Fredericton, June 6–9, pp. 113–118.	
207	RT	Vaníček, P.	1988	CGU Takes Off	EOS, 69 (20), May 17, page 594.	
208	IP	Vaníček, P.	1989	Position Oriented Society	Abstract for Quo Vadimus Symposium, IUGG, Vancouver, Aug. 9-22.	
209	B, RW	Vaníček, P.	1989	Adjustment methods	In: Encyclopaedia of Geophysics, ed R. Fairbridge, Van Nostrand Reinhold, pp. 21–26.	
210	B	Cohen, S. and P. Vaníček (eds)	1989	Slow Deformation and Transmission of Stress in the Earth	Proceedings of Symposium on Slow Deformations and Transmission of Stress in the Earth, IUGG General Assembly, Vancouver, B.C., August 1987), American Geophysical Union, Washington, D.C., 138 pages.	
211	PR	Craymer, M. R., P. Vaníček and A. Tarvydas	1989	NETAN-a computer program for the interactive analysis of geodetic networks	CISM Journal. 43(1), pp. 25–37.	
212	PR, R	Christou, N., P. Vaníček and C. Ware	1989	Geoid and density anomalies	EOS., 70 (22), pp. 625–631.	
213	C, PR	Craymer, M. and P. Vaníček	1989	Comment on "Saugus-Palmdale, California, Field Test for Refraction Error in Historical Levelling Surveys" by R.S. Stein, C.T. Whalen, S.R. Holdahl, W.E. Strange, and W. Thatcher, and Reply to "Comment on 'Further Analysis of the 1981 Southern California Field Test for Levelling Refraction by M.R. Craymer and P. Vaníček' by R.S. Stein, C.T. Whalen, S.R. Holdahl, W.E. Strange, and W. Thatcher."	JGR, 94 (B6), pp. 7667–7672.	
214	IP	Craymer, M. R., D. E. Wells, P. Vaníček, P., Rapatz and R. Devlin	1989	Specifications and Procedures for the Evaluation of Urban GPS Surveys.	Proceedings of 5th International Geodetic Symposium on Satellite Positioning, Las Cruces, N.M., March 1989, pp. 815–824.	
215	NP	Craymer, M.R. and P. Vaníček	1989	Sequential Adjustment Methods for the Maintenance of Geodetic Networks	CISM Annual Meeting, Halifax, June.	
216	NP	Devlin, R., P. Vaníček, D. Wells, M. Craymer, P. and C. Barnes	1989	Urban GPS Surveys	CISM Annual Meeting, Halifax, June.	
217	R	Craymer, M. R., D. E. Wells and P. Vaníček	1989	Report on urban GPS research project phase III-Evaluation Volume 3: Specifications and Guidelines. Geodetic Research Services Limited contract report for the City of Edmonton, Transportation Dept.	Engineering Division, Edmonton, Alberta, May 1989, 37 pages.	
218	R	Craymer, M. R., D. E. Wells, P. Vaníček and P. Rapatz	1989	Report on urban GPS research project phase III-Evaluation Volume 2: Evaluation of urban GPS surveys. Geodetic Research Services Limited contract report for the City of Edmonton, Transportation Dept.	Engineering Division, Edmonton, Alberta, March 1989, 250 pages.	
219	R	Craymer, M. R., A. Tarvydas and P. Vaníček	1989	NETAN: A program package for the interactive covariance, strain and strength analysis of networks.	Geodetic Survey of Canada Contract Report, DSS Contract No. OSQa83-00102, Surveys and Mapping Branch, Energy, Mines and Resources Canada, Ottawa, May 1987, 177 pages.	
220	R	Carrera, G. and P. Vaníček	1989	"Response": A System for the Determination of Float-Type Tide Gauge Response Functions.	Geodetic Research Services Limited Contract Report for DSS, OSC 88-00292-(014), 100 pages.	
221	IP	Vaníček, P., M. Craymer, and G. Carrera	1989	Recompilation of map of recent vertical crustal movements in Canada: a progress report.	Paper presented at Annual CGU Meeting, Montreal, May 17–19.	
222	NP	Zhang, C., L. E. Sjöberg and P. Vaníček	1989	Accuracy of the geoid computed from gravity disturbances.	Paper presented at annual CGU meeting, Montreal, May 17–19.	
223	PR	Vaníček, P.	1989	Review of Proceedings of INSMAP 86	PAGEOPH. 132(3), pp. 609–610.	
224	IP	Blitzkow, D, P. Vaníček and R.B. Langley	1989	Processamento de observaçoes GPS com o DIPOP.	Paper presented at GPS Workshop at Federal University of Paraná, Curitiba, October.	
225	NP	Vaníček, P. and L. E. Sjöberg	1989	Kernel modification in generalized Stokes's technique for geoid determination.	Proceedings of General Meeting of IAG Edinburgh, Scotland, Aug. 3-12, 1989, Sea Surface Topography and the Geoid (Eds. H. Sünkel and T. Baker), Springer, 1990, pp. 31–38.	
226	NP	Craymer, M. R., P. Vaníček and G. Carrera	1989	A report on the recompilation of the map of recent vertical crustal movements for Canada.	Poster presented at the IAG General Meeting, Edinburgh, U.K., 2–12 August.	
227	NP	Vaníček, P., R. B. Langley, D. E. Wells, A. Kleusberg and J. McLaughlin	1989	Geographic position determination: a case for the Global Positioning System.	Paper presented at URISA '89 conference, Boston, Mass., Aug. 7–9.	
228	RW	Vaníček, P.	1990	Some possible additional answers (reviewer's comments)	Quo Vadimus (Geophysics for the Next Generation), Eds. G.D. Garland & J.R. Ajel, AGU, Wash. D.C., pp. 11–12.	
229	PR	Sjöberg, L. E., P. Vaníček and M. Kwimbere	1990	Estimates of present rates of geoid uplift in Eastern North America	Manuscripta Geodaetica, Vol. 15, No. 5, pp. 261–272.	
230	NP	Craymer, M. R. and P. Vaníček	1990	A comparison of various algorithms for the spectral analysis of unevenly spaced data series.	Paper presented at CISM/CGU annual meeting, Ottawa, May 22–25.	
231	NP	Vaníček, P., G. H. Carrera and M.R. Craymer	1990	Map of recent crustal movements in Canada	Paper presented at CISM/CGU annual meeting, Ottawa, May 22–25.	
232	C	Vaníček, P.	1990	Review of "Gravimetry" by W. Torge	PAGEOPH 134(2), pp. 475–476.	
233	IP, PR	Vaníček, P.	1990	Vertical datum and the "NAD'88"	Paper presented at ACSM/ASPRS annual convention, Denver, March 18–24. Also printed in Surveying and Land Information Systems, Vol. 51, No. 2, 1991, pp. 83–86.	
234	R	Vaníček, P., C. Zhang and P. Ong	1990	Computation of a file of geoidal heights using Molodenskij's truncation method	University of New Brunswick, Dept. Surveying Engineering, T.R. #147, 106 pp.	
235	R	Vaníček, P. and T. Hou	1990	Towards a Sequential Tidal Analysis and Prediction	A contract report for Geometrix, Inc., Dartmouth, N.S., 27 pp.	
236	R	Craymer, M. R. and P. Vaníček	1990	A Statistical Analysis of Rod Scale Errors in Historic Geodetic Levelling	Contract report for USGS, 36 pp.	
237	R	Vaníček, P., E. J. Krakiwsky, M. Craymer, Y. Gao, P. Ong	1990	"Robustness Analysis"	Department of Surveying Engineering Technical Report No. 156, University of New Brunswick, 115 pp.	
238	PR	Craymer, M. R., D. E. Wells, P. Vaníček and R. L. Devlin	1990	Specifications for Urban GPS Surveys	Surveying and Land Information Systems 50(4), pp. 251–259.	
239	C	Vaníček, P.	1991	Review of "Gravity and Low-Frequency Geodynamics", edited by R. Teisseyre	PAGEOPH 135(3), pp. 498–499.	
240	PR	Vaníček, P.	1991	Robustness of Geodetic Networks	Journal of the Association of Czechoslovak Surveyors. (GAKO), Vol. 79, No. 6, pp. 111–113.	Czech
241	PR	Vaníček, P. and L. E. Sjöberg	1991	Reformulation of Stokes's Theory for Higher than Second-Degree Reference Field and Modification of Integration Kernels	JGR, 96(B4), pp. 6529–6539.	
242	R, NP	Vaníček, P., P. Ong and Changyou Zhang	1991	New Gravimetric Geoid for Canada: the "UNB'90" Solution	Proceedings of First International Geoid Commission Symposium, Milan, June 11–13, 1990 and printed in Determination of the Geoid. Present and Future, Springer-Verlay, New York, pp. 214–219.	
243	PR	Schneider, D. and P. Vaníček	1991	A New Look at the USGS 1970-1980 Horizontal Crustal Deformation Data around Hollister (California)	JGR 96 (B13), pp. 21641–21657.	
244	R	Carrera, G. H., P. Vaníček and M. R. Craymer	1991	The compilation of a map of Recent Vertical Crustal Movements in Canada	University of New Brunswick, Dept. Surveying Engineering, T.R. # 153; also published as Contract Report 91-001, File Number: 50SS.23244-7-4257, Energy, Mines and Resources Canada, 107 pp.	
245	NP	Vaníček, P., D. E. Wells and M. Kwimbere	1991	Towards the determination of continental slope footline	GALOS Technical Meeting, IUGG General Assembly, Vienna, August 22.	
246	PR, RW	Vaníček, P., R. B. Langley and A. Kleusberg	1991	"Geodesy: still the scientific backbone of surveying and mapping."	Journal ACSGS, Vol. 45(4), pp. 383–4.	
247	IP	Vaníček, P.	1991	Geodetic modelling of superficial earth deformations	AGU Chapman Conference on crustal motions, Annapolis, Md., Sept. 22–25.	
248	PR	Vaníček, P., Zhang C., and L. E. Sjöberg	1992	Comparison of Stokes's and Hotine's approaches to geoid computation	Manuscripta Geodaetica, 17 (1), pp. 29–35.	
249	NP	Vajda, P. P. Ong, M. C. Santos, P. Vaníček and M. R. Craymer	1992	Comparison of geoidal deflections computed from UNB'91 geoid with observed astro-deflections	AGU/CGU/MSA joint spring meeting, Montreal, May 12–14, 1992.	
250	NP	Ong, P. and P. Vaníček	1992	An investigation into the datum independence problem in robustness analysis.	AGU/CGU/MSA joint spring meeting, Montreal, May 12–14, 1992.	
251	NP	Craymer, M. R., S.Blackie, P. Vaníček, E. J. Krakiwsky and D.Szabo	1992	Robustness analysis of geodetic networks.	AGU/CGU/MSA joint spring meeting, Montreal, May 12–14, 1992	
252	IP	Sideris, M. G., P. Vaníček and A Mainville	1992	The Canadian Geoid Committee and the geoid in Canada.	AGU/CGU/MSA joint spring meeting, Montreal, May 12–14, 1992	
253	IP	Vaníček, P.	1993	The problem of a maritime boundary involving two horizontal geodetic datums.	Presented at First International Conference on Geodetic Aspects of the Law of the Sea (GALOS), Bali, Indonesia, June 8–13, 1992	
254	R	Krakiwsky, E. J., P. Vaníček and D. Szabo	1993	Further development and testing of robustness analysis.	Final report to Geodetic Survey of Canada, DSS contract file # 39SS.23244-1-4482, March 1993. 77pp.	
255	NP	Engels, J., E. Grafarend, W. Keller, Z. Martinec, F. Sansó and P. Vaníček	1993	The geoid as an inverse problem to be regularized.	Proceedings of the International Conference "Inverse Problems: Principles and Applications in Geophysics, Technology and Medicine", Potsdam, Germany, Aug.30-Sept.3, 1993, Akademie Verlag GmbH, Berlin, pp. 122–166.	
256	PR	Martinec, Z., C. Matyska, E. W. Grafarend and P. Vaníček	1993	On Helmert's 2nd condensation method.	Manuscripta Geodaetica, 18 pp. 417–421.	
257	B	Vaníček, P. and N. Christou (editors)	1993	Geoid and its geophysical interpretations,	CRC Press, Boca Raton, Fla., USA. 343 pp.	
258	NP	Craymer, M. R., P. Vaníček, E. J. Krakiwsky and D.Szabo	1993	Robustness analysis: a new method of assessing the strength of geodetic networks.	Annual meeting of CISM, Toronto.	
259	NP	Vaníček, P. and Z. Martinec	1993	Can the geoid be evaluated to a one-centimetre accuracy?-a look at the theory.	CGU Annual Meeting, Banff, Alberta, May 9–12, 1993.	
260	NP	Vajda, P. and P. Vaníček	1993	Truncated geoid and its geophysical interpretation.	CGU Annual meeting, Banff, Alberta, May 9–12, 1993.	
261	NP	Szabo, D. J., M. R. Craymer, E. J. Krakiwsky, and P. Vaníček	1993	Robustness measures for geodetic networks.	Proceedings of the 7th International FIG Symposium on Deformation Measurements, Banff, Alberta, May 3 to 7, 1993. pp 151–160.	
262	NP	Craymer, M., P. Vaníček, E. J. Krakiwsky and D. Szabo	1993	Robustness Analysis.	First International Symposium on Mathematical and Physical Foundations of geodesy, Stuttgart, Germany, September 7–9, 1993.	
263	PR	Vaníček, P. and Z. Martinec	1994	Stokes-Helmert scheme for the evaluation of a precise geoid	Manuscripta Geodaetica 19 pp. 119–128.	
264	PR	Hou T. and P. Vaníček	1994	Towards a real-time analysis of tides.	International Hydrographic Review, LXXI (1), Monaco, pp. 29–52.	
265	PR, NP	Vaníček, P. and G. Carrera	1994	Treatment of sea level records in linear vertical crustal motion modelling.	Proceedings of the 8-th International Symposium on Recent Crustal Movements, Kobe, Japan, December 6–11, 1993, special issue of Journal of Geodetic Society of Japan, pp. 305–309.	
266	NP	Carrera, G. and P. Vaníček	1994	Compilation of a new map of recent vertical crustal movements in Canada.	The 8-th International Symposium on Recent Crustal Movements, Kobe, Japan, December 6–11, 1993.	
267	PR	Martinec, Z. and P. Vaníček	1994	The indirect effect of Stokes-Helmert's technique for a spherical approximation of the geoid.	Manuscripta Geodaetica 19(2), pp. 213–219.	
268	PR	Martinec, Z. and P. Vaníček	1994	Direct topographical effect of Helmert's condensation for a spherical geoid.	Manuscripta Geodaeticaa 19(3), pp. 257–268.	
269	PR	Vaníček, P., D. E. Wells and T. Hou	1994	Determination of the Foot of the Continental Slope.	DSS Contract # 23420-3-R207/01-OSC Report for Geological Survey of Canada, Atlantic Geoscience Centre, Bedford Institute of Oceanography, Dartmouth, N.S., 49 pp.	
270	C	Vaníček, P.	1994	New home for the Finnish Geodetic Institute,	Geomatica, 48 (3), p. 243.	
271	IP	Vaníček, P., D. E. Wells and T. Hou	1994	Continental slope foot-line determination: Geometrical Aspects,	International Workshop on LOS Article 76, UNB, Fredericton, N.B., April 14–15, Proceedings "Law of the Sea Article 76 Workshop", pp. 57–67.	
272	NP	Vaníček, P., D. E. Wells, T. Hou and Z. Ou	1994	First experiences with continental slope foot-line determination from real bathymetric data	Proceedings of international symposium INSMAP 94, Hannover, Germany, September 19–23, pp. 385–397.	
273	IP	Vaníček, P.	1994	On the global vertical datum and its role in maritime boundary demarcation;	Proceedings of international symposium INSMAP 94, Hannover, Germany, September 19–23, pp. 243–250.	
274	PR	Martinec, Z., P. Vaníček, A. Mainville and M. Véronneau	1995	The effect of lake water on geoidal heights	Manuscripta Geodaetica, 20, pp. 193–203.	
275	PR	Craymer, M. R., P. Vaníček and R. O. Castle	1995	Estimation of Rod Scale Errors in Geodetic Levelling	JGR, 100 (B8), pp. 15129–15146.	
276	R	Vaníček, P., A. Kleusberg, Z. Martinec, W. Sun, P. Ong, M. Najafi, P. Vajda, L. Harrie, P. Tomášek and B. ter Horst	1995	Compilation of a precise regional geoid,	DSS Contract # 23244-1-4405/01-SS Report for Geodetic Survey Division, Ottawa, 45 pp.	
277	NP	Vaníček, P. and W. Sun	1995	Downward continuation of Helmert's gravity	CGU annual meeting, Banff, May 22–25, 1995.	
278	NP	Sun, W., S. Okubo and P. Vaníček	1995	Surface displacements from dislocations	IUGG General Assembly, Boulder, Colo., July, 1995.	
279	NP	Ou, Z. and P. Vaníček	1995	Automatic tracing of the foot of the continental slope	IUGG General Assembly, Boulder, Colo., July, 1995.	
280	NP	Craymer, M. R., P. Vaníček and E. J. Krakiwsky	1995	Application of Reliability and Robustness Analysis to Large Geodetic Networks	IUGG General Assembly, Boulder, Colo., July, 1995.	
281	NP	Sun, W. and P. Vaníček	1995	Downward continuation of Helmert's gravity disturbance	IUGG General Assembly, Boulder, Colo., July, 1995.	
282	NP	Santos, M., P. Vaníček and R. B. Langley	1995	GPS real time orbit improvement	IUGG General Assembly, Boulder, Colo., July, 1995.	
283	NP	Santos, M. C., P. Vaníček and R. B. Langley	1995	An assessment of the effect of mathematical correlations on GPS network computation: a summary.	XVII Congresso Brasileiro de Cartografia, Salvador, Bahia, Brazil, August, 1995.	
284	NP	Santos, M. C., P. Vaníček and R. B. Langley	1995	Orbit improvement and generation of ephemerides for the global positioning system satellites: a summary.	XVII Congresso Brasileiro de Cartografia, Salvador, Bahia, Brazil, August, 1995. Printed in Revista Brasileira de Cartografia, 46, October 1995, pp. 95–99.	
285	R	Vaníček, P., P. Ong, E. J. Krakiwsky, and M. R. Craymer	1996	Application of robustness analysis to large geodetic networks,	DSS Contract # 23244-3-4363/01-SQ Report for Geodetic Survey Division, Ottawa, Technical Report #180, GGE, UNB, pp 82.	
286	R	Wells, D. E., A. Kleusberg and P. Vaníček	1996	A seamless vertical-reference surface for acquisition, management and display (ECDIS) of hydrographic data,	CHS Contract # IIHS4-122 Report for Canadian Hydrographic Survey, Ottawa, Technical Report # 179, GGE, UNB, pp. 73.	
287	PR	Vaníček, P., M. Najafi, Z. Martinec, L. Harrie and L.E.Sjöberg	1996	Higher-order reference field in the generalized Stokes-Helmert scheme for geoid computation.	Journal of Geodesy, 70 (3), pp. 176–182.	
288	PR	Martinec, Z., P. Vaníček, A. Mainville and M. Véronneau	1996	Evaluation of topographical effects in precise geoid determination from densely sampled heights,	Journal of Geodesy, 70(11), pp. 746–754.	
289	PR	Vaníček, P. and R. R. Steeves	1996	Transformation of coordinates between two horizontal geodetic datums.	Journal of Geodesy, 70(11), pp. 740–745.	
290	B	Vaníček, P. (with contributions of GALOS members)	1996	Geodetic Commentary to TALOS Manual,	Complement to Special Publication No. 51, International Hydrographic Bureau, Monaco. pp. 11.	
291	PR	Ou, Z. and P. Vaníček	1996	Automatic tracing of the foot of the continental slope.	Marine Geodesy 19, pp. 181–195.	
292	RW	Featherstone, W. E. and P. Vaníček	1996	The usage of Stokes in the possessive form,	Bulletin of the International Geoid Service, No.5, International Geoid Service, Milan, Italy, December 1996, pp. 153–154.	
293	PR	Sun, W., S. Okubo and P. Vaníček	1996	Surface displacements caused by earthquake dislocations in realistic earth models.	Journal of Geophysical Research, Vol.101, No.B4, pp. 8561–8578.	
294	C	Vaníček, P., A. M. Abolghasem and M. Najafi	1996	The need for precise geoid and how to get it	NCC Scientific and Technical Quarterly Journal, Vol.7, No.1, Serial 25, pp. 16–22.	Persian
295	PR	Martinec, Z. and P. Vaníček	1996	Formulation of the boundary-value problem for geoid determination with a higher-order reference field.	Geophysical Journal International, 126, pp. 219–228.	
296	NP	Sun, W. and P. Vaníček	1996	On the discrete problem of downward Helmert's gravity continuation.	Proceedings of Session G7 (Techniques for local geoid determination), Annual meeting of European Geophysical Society, The Hague, May 6–10, 1996, Reports of the Finnish Geodetic Institute, 96:2, pp. 29–34.	
297	PR	Vaníček, P., W. Sun, P. Ong, Z. Martinec, P. Vajda and B. ter Horst	1996	Downward continuation of Helmert's gravity,	Journal of Geodesy 71 (1), pp. 21–34.	
298	PR	Santos, M. C., P. Vaníček and R. B. Langley	1996	Principles of Orbit Improvement and Generation of Ephemerides for the Global Positioning System Satellites.	Revista Brasileira de Geofisica (Brazilian Journal of Geophysics), Vol. 14 No. 3, pp. 253–262.	
299	PR	Ou, Z. and P. Vaníček	1996	The effect of data density on the accuracy of foot-line determination through maximum curvature surface by automatic ridge-tracing algorithm.	International Hydrographic Review, Vol. LXXIII (2), pp. 27–38.	
300	NP	Vaníček, P. and Z. Ou	1997	Automatic tracing of continental slope foot-line from bathymetric data.	Proceedings of the Second International GALOS Conference, Bali, July 1 to 4, 1996, pp. 267–302.	
301	PR	Santos, M. C., P. Vaníček and R. B. Langley	1997	Effect of Mathematical Correlations in GPS Network Computation Using Phase Double Difference Observation.	Journal of Surveying Engineering, Vol. 123, No. 3, pp. 101–112.	
302	IP	Vaníček, P., P. Novák and J. Huang	1997	Construction of mean Helmert's anomalies on the geoid, presented at Geoid Workshop,	Geodetic Survey Division, Ottawa, April 28–30.	
303	NP	Vaníček, P.	1997	Some technical aspects of the delimitation of maritime spaces defined by the LOS,	Proceedings of "Curso de Derecho del Mar", organised by 'Comision Permanente del Pacifico Sur' and 'Academia Diplomatica del Peru', Lima, August 26–30, 1997	Spanish
304	NP	Vaníček, P., M. Veronneau and Z. Martinec	1997	Determination of mean Helmert's anomalies on the geoid,	IAG General Assembly, Rio de Janeiro, Sept. 3 to 9.	
305	NP	Featherstone, W. E. and P. Vaníček	1997	To modify or not to modify?,	IAG General Assembly, Rio de Janeiro, Sept. 3 to 9.	
306	PR	Vajda, P. and P. Vaníček	1997	On gravity inversion for point mass anomalies by means of the truncated geoid.	Studia Geophysica et Geodaetica, 41, pp. 329–344.	
307	C	Vaníček, P.	1998	Review of "On Being the Head of a Department: a Personal View", by J. Conway.	Journal of Geodesy, 72, 12, p. 709.	
308	PR	Sun, W. and P. Vaníček	1998	On some problems of the downward continuation of 5' x 5' mean Helmert's gravity disturbance.	Journal of Geodesy, 72, 7–8, pp. 411–420.	
309	PR	Vajda, P. and P. Vaníček	1998	On the numerical evaluation of the truncated geoid.	Contributions to Geophysics and Geodesy, Geophysical Institute of Slovak Academy of Sciences, Bratislava, Slovakia, Vol. 28, No.1, pp. 15–27.	
310	PR, C	Vaníček, P.	1998	The height of reason (a letter to the editor),	GPS World, April 1998, p. 14.	
311	PR	Vaníček, P.	1998	On the errors in the delimitation of maritime spaces.	International Hydrographic Review, LXXV(1), March, pp. 59–64.	
312	IP	Vaníček, P., P. Novák and J. Huang	1998	Geoid modelling at UNB,	presented at Geoid Workshop, Geodetic Survey Division, Ottawa, May 14–15.	
313	NP	Novák, P. and P. Vaníček	1998	Atmospherical Corrections for the Evaluation of Mean Helmert's Gravity Anomalies.	CGU Annual Meeting, Quebec City, May 18–20, 1998.	
314	PR	Vaníček, P. and W. E. Featherstone	1998	Performance of three types of Stokes's kernel in the combined solution for the geoid,	Journal of Geodesy, 72, 12, pp. 684–697.	
315	PR	Vajda, P. and P. Vaníček	1998	A note on spectral filtering of the truncated geoid.	Contributions to Geophysics and Geodesy, Vol.28, No.4, pp. 253–262.	
316	R	Krakiwsky, J. K., P. Vaníček, D. Szabo and M. R. Craymer	1999	Development and testing of in-context confidence regions for geodetic survey network.	Report # 99-001, Geodetic Survey Division, Geomatics Canada, Ottawa, 26 p.	
317	PR	Vajda, P. and P. Vaníček	1999	Truncated geoid and gravity inversion for one point mass anomaly.	Journal of Geodesy 73, pp. 58–66.	
318	PR	Vaníček, P., J. Huang, P. Novák, M. Véronneau, S. Pagiatakis, Z. Martinec and W. E. Featherstone	1999	Determination of boundary values for the Stokes-Helmert problem.	Journal of Geodesy 73, pp. 180–192.	
319	RT	Andersen, O. B., D. Fritsch and P. Vaníček	1999	Getting ready for the next century (International evaluation of Finnish Geodetic Institute),	Finnish Ministry of Agriculture and Forestry, Helsinki, 68 p.	
320	IP	Novák, P. and P. Vaníček	1999	Effect of distant topographical masses on geoid determination.	CGU Annual Meeting, Banff, May 9–12, 1999.	
321	IP	Vaníček, P. and P. Novák	1999	Comparison between planar and spherical models of topography.	CGU Annual Meeting, Banff, May 9–12, 1999.	
322	NP	Huang, J. and P. Vaníček	1999	A faster algorithm for numerical Stokes's integration.	CGU Annual Meeting, Banff, May 9–12, 1999.	
323	NP	Novák, P., P. Vaníček, M. Véronneau, W. E. Featherstone and S.A. Holmes	1999	On the accuracy of Stokes's integration in the precise high-frequency geoid determination.	AGU Spring Meeting, Boston, May 31 - June 3.	
324	NP	Huang, J., P. Vaníček, W. Brink and S. Pagiatakis	1999	Effect of topographical mass density variation on gravity and the geoid in the Canadian Rocky mountains.	AGU Spring Meeting, Boston, May 31 - June 3.	
325	NP	Vaníček, P. and J. Wong	1999	On the downward continuation of Helmert's gravity anomalies.	AGU Spring Meeting, Boston, May 31 - June 3.	
326	NP	Sideris, M., P. Vaníček, J. Huang, and I.N. Tsiavos	1999	Comparison of downward continuation techniques of terrestrial gravity anomalies,		
327	NP	Featherstone, W. E., J. Evans and P. Vaníček	1999	Optimal selection of the degree of geopotential model and integration radius in regional gravimetric geoid computation.	IUGG General Assembly, Birmingham, July 18 – 30.	
328	PR	Najafi, M., P. Vaníček, P. Ong and M.R. Craymer	1999	Accuracy of a regional geoid,	Geomatica 53,3, pp. 297–305.	
329	PR	Vaníček, P. and M. Omerbasic	1999	Does a navigation algorithm have to ue Kalman filter?	Canadian Aeronautical and Space Institute Journal, 45, 3, pp. 292–296.	
330	PR	Featherstone, W. E. and P. Vaníček	1999	The role of coordinate systems, coordinates and heights in horizontal datum transformations,	The Australian Surveyor, 44(2), pp. 143–150.	
331	PR	Vajda, P. and P. Vaníček	1999	The instant of the dimple onset for the high degree truncated geoid.	Contributions to Geophysics and Geodesy, Vol. 29/3, pp. 193–204.	
332	IP	Vaníček, P.	1999	Propagation of errors from shore baselines seaward.	Proceedings of ABLOS International Conference, Monaco, September 9 to 10, International Hydrographic Bureau, Monaco, pp. 110–119.	
333	RW	Vaníček, P.	2000	The detection of crustal movements by geodetic space techniques.	Festschrift in honour of Adam Chrzanowski, Technical Report # 205, GGE, UNB, pp. 133–138.	
334	PR	Huang, J., P. Vaníček and P. Novák	2000	An alternative algorithm to FFT for the numerical evaluation of Stokes's integral.	Studia Geophysica et Geodaetica 44, pp. 374–380.	
335	IP	Sideris, M., K. R. Thompson and P. Vaníček	2000	Current status of precise geoid determination in Canada for geo-referencing and oceanography/hydrography applications,	Geomatics 2000, Montreal, March 8.	
336	IP	Vaníček, P., J. Janák and M. Véronneau	2000	Impact of Digital Elevation Models on geoid modelling,	Geomatics 2000, Montreal, March 8.	
337	IP	Vaníček, P. and J. Janák	2000	The UNB technique for precise geoid determination,	CGU meeting, Banff, May 24–26.	
338	IP	Janák, J. and P. Vaníček	2000	UNB North American geoid 2000 model: theory, intermediate and final results,	GEOIDE annual meeting, Calgary, May 25–26.	
339	NP	Omerbasic M. and P. Vaníček	2000	Least Squares Spectral Analysis of gravity data from the Canadian super-conducting gravimeter: an ongoing project report,	poster presentation at GEOIDE annual meeting, Calgary, May 25–26.	
340	NP	Vaníček, P., J. Janák and J. Huang	2000	Mean Vertical Gradient of Gravity,	Poster presentation at GGG2000 conference, Banff, July 31 – August 4. GGG2000 Proceedings (Ed. M.Sideris), pp259–262.	
341	IP	Véronneau, M., S. D. Pagiatakis, P. Vaníček, P. Novák, J. Huang, J. Janák, M.G. Sideris and O. Esan	2000	Canadian Gravimetric Geoid Model 2000 (CGG2000): Preliminary results.	GGG2000 conference, Banff, July 31 - August 4.	
342	NP	Vaníček, P. and J. Janák	2000	Truncation of 2D spherical convolution integration with an isotropic kernel, Algorithms 2000 conference,	Tatranska Lomnica, Slovakia, September 15–18.	
343	PR	Xu, B. and P. Vaníček	2001	Navigation with position potential.	Navigation 47(3), pp. 227–236.	
344	PR	Huang, J., P. Vaníček, S. Pagiatakis and W. Brink	2001	Effect of topographical mass density variation on gravity and the geoid in the Canadian Rocky mountains.	Journal of Geodesy 74 (11-12), pp. 805–815.	
345	PR	Novák, P., P. Vaníček, M. Véronneau, W.E. Featherstone and S.A. Holmes	2001	On the accuracy of modified Stokes's integration in high-frequency gravimetric geoid determination: A comparison of two numerical techniques.	Journal of Geodesy 74, pp. 644–654.	
346	PR	Vaníček, P., P. Novák and Z. Martinec	2001	Geoid, topography, and the Bouguer plate or shell.	Journal of Geodesy 75 (4), pp. 210–215.	
347	PR	Vaníček, P., M. R. Craymer, and E.J.Krakiwsky	2001	Robustness analysis of geodetic networks,	Journal of Geodesy 75 (4), pp. 199–209.	
348	B	Vaníček, P.	2001	Geodesy. Chapter in Encyclopedia of Science and Technology,	Academic Press. 32 pages.	
349	PR	Vajda, P., L. Brimich and P. Vaníček	2001	Geodynamic applications of the truncation filtering methodology: A synthetic case study for a point source of heat: Progress report,	Contributions to Geophysics and Geodesy 30/4, pp. 311– 322.	
350	PR	Novák, P., P. Vaníček, Z. Martinec and M. Véronneau	2001	The effect of distant terrain on gravity and the geoid.	Journal of Geodesy 75 (9-10), pp. 491–504.	
351	NP	Janák, J. and P. Vaníček	2001	Systematic error of the geoid model in the Rocky Mountains,	CGU annual conference, Ottawa, May 15–17, 2001.	
352	NP	Omerbasic M. and P. Vaníček	2001	Accurate spectral analysis of very strong earthquakes’ signatures in superconducting gravimeter records,	poster presentation at the Digital Earth conference, Fredericton, June 25–28.	
353	NP	Janák, J., P. Vaníček and B. Alberts	2001	Point and mean values of topographical effects,	the Digital Earth conference, Fredericton, June 25–28.	
354	IP	Vaníček, P. and J. Janák	2001	Refinement of the UNB geoid model: progress report for proj.#10,	poster presentation at GEOIDE annual meeting, Fredericton, June 21–22.	
355	IP	Janák, J. and P. Vaníček	2001	Improvement of the University of New Brunswick's gravimetric geoid model for Canada,	poster presentation at IAG General Assembly, Budapest, Sept. 3 to 7.	
356	IP	Huang, J., P. Vaníček and S. Pagiatakis	2001	On some numerical aspects of downward continuation of gravity anomalies,	Proceedings of IAG General Assembly, Budapest, Sept. 3 to 7, Paper #58BD.	
357	PR	Vajda, P. and P. Vaníček	2002	The 3-D truncation filtering methodology defined for planar and spherical models: Interpreting gravity data generated by point masses.	Studia Geophysica et Geodaetica 46, pp. 469–484.	
358	NP	Omerbasic M. and P. Vaníček	2002	Last Squares Spectral Analysis of very-strong-earthquake-excited gravity variations recorded by the Canadian global superconducting gravimeter.	Presented at the 74th annual meeting of the Eastern Section, Seismological Society of America, Boston, October 20–22.	
359	PR	Vaníček, P., P. Novák, S. Pagiatakis and M. R. Craymer	2002	On the proper determination of transformation parameters of a horizontal geodetic datum,	Geomatica 56 (4), pp. 329–340.	
360	PR	Hernandez, N. A., M. R. Gomez and P. Vaníček	2002	The far zone contribution in spherical Stokes's integration,	Revista Cartografica 74–75, pp. 61–74.	
361	PR	Huang, J., M. G. Sideris, P. Vaníček and I.N.Tsiavos	2003	Numerical investigation of downward continuation techniques for gravity anomalies.	Bollettino di Geofisica Teorica ed Applicata LXII, No.1, pp. 34–48.	
362	NP	Berber, M., P. Dare, and P. Vaníček	2003	"An Innovative Method for the Quality Assessment of Precise Geomatics Engineering Networks."	The Mathematics of Information Technology and Complex Systems (MITACS) Atlantic Interchange, Dalhousie University, 24 March 2003, Halifax, NS, Canada.	
363	NP	Vaníček, P., R. Tenzer and J.Huang	2003	Role of "No Topography space" in the Stokes-Helmert scheme for geoid determination.	CGU annual meeting, Banff, May 10–14.	
364	NP	Santos, M, R. Tenzer and P. Vaníček	2003	Effect of terrain on orthometric height.	CGU annual meeting, Banff, May 10–14.	
365	NP	Tenzer, R., and P. Vaníček	2003	New results for UNB geoid.	CGU annual meeting, Banff, May 10–14.	
366	NP	Martin, B.-A., C.MacPhee, R. Tenzer, P. Vaníček and M. Santos	2003	Mean gravity along plumbline.	CGU annual meeting, Banff, May 10–14.	
367	NP	Vaníček, P., R. Tenzer and M. Santos	2003	New views of the spherical Bouguer gravity anomaly. Poster presentation,	IUGG general assembly, Sapporo, Japan, June 27 - July 8.	
368	NP	Tenzer, R., P. Vaníček and M. Santos	2003	Corrections to be applied to Helmert's orthometric heights.	Poster presentation, IUGG general assembly, Sapporo, Japan, June 27 - July 8.	
369	PR	Berber, M., P. Dare and P. Vaníček.	2003	On the application of robustness analysis to geodetic networks,	Meeting of Canadian Society for Civil Engineering, Moncton, June 4–7.	
370	PR	Tenzer, R., P. Vaníček and P. Novák	2003	Far-zone contribution to the topographical effects in the Stokes-Helmert method of geoid determination.	Studia Geophysica et Geodaetica 47, pp. 467–480.	
371	PR	Tenzer, R. and P. Vaníček	2003	Geoid-quasigeoid correction in formulation of the fundamental formula of physical geodesy.	Revista Brasileira de Cartografia. 55(1), pp. 57 – 61.	
372	PR	Vaníček, P., J. Janák and W.E. Featherstone	2003	Truncation of spherical convolution integration with an isotropic kernel,	Studia Geophysica et Geodaetica, 47 (3), pp. 455–465.	
373	NP	Omerbasic, M. and P. Vaníček	2003	Earth-model discrimination via terrestrial gravimetric spectroscopy.	Abstract in AGU winter assembly, San Francisco, 2–6 December 2003	
374	PR	Tenzer, R. and P. Vaníček	2003	The correction to Helmert's orthometric height due to actual lateral variation of topographical density.	Revista Brasileira de Cartografia, 55(2), pp. 44–47.	
375	PR	Tenzer, R., P. Vaníček and S. van Eck der Sluijs	2003	The far-zone contribution to upward continuation of gravity anomalies.	Revista Brasileira de Cartografia, 55(2), pp. 48–54.	
376	PR	Vaníček, P., R.Tenzer, L.E. Sjöberg, Z. Martinec and W.E.Featherstone	2004	New views of the spherical Bouguer gravity anomaly.	Journal of Geophysics International 159(2), pp. 460–472.	
377	NP	Berber, M, P.Vaníček, and P. Dare	2004	Quality control of geodetic networks through robustness analysis.	AGU/CGU Annual Meeting, Montreal, 17 to 21 May.	
378	NP	Koohzare, A., P. Vaníček and M.Santos	2004	Glacial isostatic adjustment observed using historical tide gauge records and precise relevelling data in Eastern Canada.	AGU/CGU Annual Meeting, Montreal, 17 to 21 May.	
379	NP	Santos, M., Tenzer, R. and P. Vaníček	2004	Mean gravity along the plumbline.	AGU/CGU Annual Meeting, Montreal, 17 to 21 May.	
380	NP	Kingdon, R., R. Tenzer, P. Vaníček and M. Santos	2004	Calculation of the Spherical Terrain Correction to Helmert's Orthometric Height.	AGU/CGU Annual Meeting, Montreal, 17 to 21 May.	
381	NP	Yang, H., P. Vaníček and M. Santos	2004	Atmospheric effects in three-space scenario for the Stokes-Helmert method of geoid determination,	AGU/CGU Annual Meeting, Montreal, 17 to 21 May.	
382	NP	Koohzare, A., P. Vaníček and M.Santos	2004	Spatial analysis and treatment of tide gauge records using GIS.	GEOIDE Annual meeting, Ottawa June 1 to 2.	
383	NP	Yang, H., P. Vaníček, M. Santos and R. Tenzer	2004	An introduction to Stokes-Helmert method for precise geoid determination.	GEOIDE Annual meeting, Ottawa June 1 to 2.	
384	NP	Baran, I., S.J.Classens, W.E. Featherstone, S.A. Holmes, M. Kuhn and P Vaníček	2004	First Results of Australian Synthetic Earth Gravity Model (AUSSEGM),	GGSM04, Porto, Aug.30 to Sept. 3.	
385	NP	Baran, I., S. J. Claessens, W.E. Featherstone, S.A. Holmes, M. Kuhn, P. Vaníček	2004	Australian synthetic earth gravity field model (AUSSEGM) – a regional earth gravity model.	Poster presentation at AGU Fall meeting, San Francisco, December 13 to 17.	
386	PR	Vaníček, P. and M. Najafi	2004	New cartographic mapping for Iran.	Journal of Spatial Science, 49(2), pp. 33–44.	
387	PR	Vaníček, P., M. Santos, R.Tenzer and A.Hernandez	2004	Algunos aspectos sobre alturas ortométricas y normales.	Revista Cartografica, Vol. 76–77, pp. 79–86.	
388	PR	Tenzer, R., P. Vaníček, S. van Eck der Sluijs and A.Hernandez	2004	On some numerical aspects of primary indirect topographical effect computation in the Stokes-Helmert theory of geoid determination.	Revista Cartografica, Vol. 76–77, pp. 71–77.	
389	PR	Vajda, P., P.Vaníček, P. Novák, and B. Meurers	2004	On the evaluation of Newton integrals in geodetic coordinates: Exact formulation and spherical approximation.	Contributions to Geophysics and Geodesy, 34 (4), pp. 289–314.	
390	PR	Vajda, P., P. Vaníček and B.Meurers	2004	On the removal of the effect of topography on gravity disturbance in gravity data inversion or interpretation,	Contributions to Geophysics and Geodesy, 34 (4), pp. 339–369.	
391	PR	Janák, J. and P. Vaníček	2004	Mean free-air gravity anomalies in the mountains.	Studia Geophysica et Geodaetica, 49(1), pp. 31–42.	
392	PR	Hernandez, A.N., P.Vaníček, M. Santos and R. Tenzer	2004	Evaluación del Effecto Atmosférico Directo en el Área de Influencia de la Solución Geoidal Mexicana,	Revista Cartografica, No.78-79, pp 7–12.	
393	IR	Ellmann, A. and P. Vaníček	2005	UNB application of Stokes-Helmert's approach to geoid computation.	Annual meeting of EGS, Vienna, April 24.	
394	PR	Tenzer, R, P. Vaníček, M. Santos, W. E. Featherstone, and M. Kuhn	2005	Rigorous orthometric heights.	Journal of Geodesy 79, pp. 1432–1394. doi:10.1007/s001-005-0445-2.	
395	NP	Ellman, A., P.Vaníček, M. Santos	2005	No Topography approach to Stokes-Helmert's geoid modelling: results for a test area in the Canadian Rockies,	Presented at the annual meeting of CGU, Banff, 8–11 May.	
396	NP	Koohzare, A., P. Vaníček and M. Santos	2005	Compilation of a map of vertical crustal-movements in Eastern Canada using spline polynomials,	Paper presented at the annual meeting of CGU, Banff, 8–11 May. Extended abstract printed in Elements, Vol 23, No. 2, pp. 30–34.	
397	NP	Kingdon, R., P. Vaníček, M. Santos, A. Ellmann, R. Tenzer	2005	Corrections for the improvement of the Canadian height system.	Canadian Geophysical Union. Annual Meeting, Banff, May 8–11, 2005.	
398	IP	Ellman, A., P.Vaníček, M. Santos	2005	Precise geoid determination for geo-referencing and oceanography,	Poster presented at the annual meeting of the GEOIDE, Quebec City, May 29–31.	
399	NP	Tenzer, R., A. Ellmann, P. Moore and P. Vaníček	2005	On the evaluation of gravity disturbances.	Poster presentation, IAG General Assembly, Cairns, Australia, August 22–26.	
400	NP	Koohzare, A., P. Vaníček and M. Santos	2005	The use of smooth piecewise algebraic approximation in the determination of vertical crustal movements in Eastern Canada.	Poster presentation, IAG General Assembly, Cairns, Australia, August 22–26.	
401	PR	Kingdon, R., P. Vaníček, M. Santos, A. Ellmann and R. Tenzer	2005	Toward an improved height system for Canada.	Geomatica, Vol. 59, No. 3, pp. 241 to 249.	
402	PR	Vajda, P., P.Vaníček, and B.Meurers	2006	A new physical foundation for anomalous gravity.	Studia Geodaetica et Geofysica No. 50, pp. 189 to 216.	
403	IP	Vajda, P., P. Vaníček and B. Meurers	2006	On the relation between anomalous gravity and the attraction of earth's subsurface anomalous density.	Presented at 2-nd Workshop on International Gravity Field Research, Smolenice castle, Slovak Republic, May 8–9, 2006	
404	NP	Vajda, P., P. Vaníček, P. Novák, R. Tenzer and A. Ellmann	2006	Secondary indirect effects in gravimetry.	2-nd Workshop on International Gravity Field Research, Smolenice castle, Slovak Republic, May 8–9, 2006	
405	NP	Koohzare, A., P. Vaníček and M. Santos	2006	The Contribution of Northern US Geodetic Data to the Study of Vertical Deformations of the Crust in Canada,	Poster presentation at AGU Spring Assembly, Baltimore, MD, May 23–26.	
406	NP	Kingdon, R., A. Ellmann, P. Vaníček and M. Santos	2006	The cost of assuming a lateral density distribution in corrections to Helmert orthometric heights,	Oral presentation at AGU Spring Assembly, Baltimore, MD, May 23–26.	
407	PR	Sanso, F. and P.Vaníček	2006	The orthometric height and the holonomity problem.	Presented at the Grafarend symposium in Stuttgart, February 18;Journal of Geodesy 80 (5), pp. 225–232.	
408	NP	Ellmann, A., P. Vaníček, M. Santos and R. Kingdon	2006	The partnership of the precise geoid and orthometric heights.	Oral presentation at Canadian Geophysical Union Annual Meeting, Banff, May 14–16.	
409	NP	Kingdon, R., A. Ellmann, P. Vaníček and M. Santos	2006	Estimating the cost to Helmert heights of lateral approximation of the topographical density distribution.	Canadian Geophysical Union Annual Meeting, Banff, May 14–16.	
410	NP	Koohzare, A., P. Vaníček and M. Santos	2006	Radial basis functions fitting methods as applied to determine postglacial tilt in the Canadian Prairies.	Canadian Geophysical Union Annual Meeting, Banff, May 14–16.	
411	NP	Ellmann, A., P. Vaníček, M. Santos and R. Kingdon	2006	Symbiosis of orthometric heights with the geoid,	The 8th GEOIDE Annual Scientific Conference – Poster presentation, Banff, May 31 – June 2.	
412	PR	Berber, M., P. Dare and P. Vaníček	2006	Robustness analysis of 2D networks,	Journal of Surveying Engineering, 132 (4), pp. 168–175.	
413	PR	Baran, I., M. Kuhn, S.J. Claessens, W.E. Featherstone, S.A Holmes and P. Vaníček	2006	A synthetic Earth's gravity model designed specifically for testing regional gravimetric geoid determination algorithms,	Journal of Geodesy 80(1):1-16.	
414	PR	Koohzare, A., P. Vaníček and M. Santos	2006	Compilation of the map of recent vertical crustal movements in Eartern Canada using GIS,	Journal of Surveying Engineering, 132 (4), pp. 160–167.	
415	IP	Kingdon, R. W., C. Hwang, U.-S. Hsiao, A. Ellmann, M. Santos and P. Vaníček	2006	Applications of satellite altimetry to evaluating effects of lake water on gravity and the geoid,	IAG Workshop 2006: Coast and Land Applications of Satellite Altimetry, Beijing (oral presentation), July 20 – 22.	
416	NP	Featherstone, W. and P. Vaníček	2006	A new philosophy on the use of modified Stokes's kernels,	First International Symposium of The International Gravity Field Service (IGFS), oral presentation, August 28 - September 1, 2006, Istanbul, Turkey.	
417	NP	Kingdon, R. W., M. Santos, A. Ellmann and P. Vaníček	2006	Estimating the shortcomings of 2D density models in calculating topographical effects on gravity and orthometric heights,	First International Symposium of The International Gravity Field Service (IGFS), oral presentation, August 28 - September 1, 2006, Istanbul, Turkey.	
418	NP	Ellmann A., P. Vaníček and M. Santos	2006	Validation of the Stokes-Helmert geoid determination using Synthetic Earth Gravity Model,	First International Symposium of The International Gravity Field Service (IGFS), oral presentation, August 28 - September 1, 2006, Istanbul, Turkey.	
419	PR	Santos, M., P. Vaníček, W. E., Featherstone, R. Kingdon, B.-A. Martin, M.Kuhn and R.Tenzer	2006	Relation between the rigorous and Helmert's definitions of orthometric heights.	Journal of Geodesy, Vol. 80, pp. 691–704.	
420	PR	Tenzer, R., P. Novak, P. Moore, M. Kuhn and P. Vaníček	2006	Explicit formula for the geoid-quasigeoid separation,	Studia Geodaetica et Geofysica 50, pp. 607–618.	
421	PR	Kutoglu, H. and P. Vaníček	2006	Effect of common point selection on coordinate transformation parameter determination.	Studia Geodaetica et Geofysica (50), pp. 525–536.	
422	IP	Ellmann, A. and P. Vaníček	2006	UNB application of Stokes-Helmert's approach to geoid computation,	Journal of Geodynamics 43 (2), pp. 200–213, doi:10.1016/j.jog.2006.09.019.	
423	NP	Ellmann, A., P. Vaníček, M. Santos and R. Kingdon	2007	Interrelation between the geoid and orthometric heights,	First International Symposium of The International Gravity Field Service (IGFS), oral presentation, August 28 - September 1, 2006, Istanbul, Turkey. Forsberg R.; Kilicoglu, A. (Eds.). Proceedings of the 1st International Symposium of the International Gravity Field Service "Gravity Field of the Earth", pp. 130 – 135. General Command of Mapping, Ankara, Turkey	
424	PR	Vajda, P., P. Vaníček, P. Novák, R. Tenzer and A. Ellmann	2007	Secondary indirect effect in gravity anomaly data inversion or interpretation,	J. Geophys. Res., 112, B06411, doi:10.1029/2006JB004470.	
425	NP	Hatam, Y., R. Bayer, Y. Djamour, P. Vaníček, N. LeMoign, M. Mohammad Karim, A.M. Abolghasem, M. Karpychev, R. Sadat, S. Rafiey	2007	A new (tele cabin /land) national gravity calibration line for Iran,	Poster presentation at General Assembly of European Geosciences Union, Vienna, April 15–20.	
427	NP	Cheraghi, H., Y. Hatam, P. Vaníček, M. Najafi Alamdari, Y. Djamour, J. Qarakhani, R. Saadat	2007	Effect of lateral topographical density variations on the geoid in Iran,	Poster presentation at General Assembly of European Geosciences Union, Vienna, April 15–20.	
428	NP	Koohzare, A., P. Vaníček, and M. Santos	2007	The pattern of Vertical Crustal movements in Canada using geodetic data,	oral presentation Canadian Geophysical Union Annual Meeting, St. John's, May 30-June 2.	
429	NP	Avalos, D., M. Santos and P. Vaníček	2007	The Mexican Gravimetric Geoid: state-of-the-art and future directions	oral presentation Canadian Geophysical Union Annual Meeting, St. John's, May 30-June 2.	
430	IP	Vajda P., A. Ellmann, B. Meurers, P. Vaníček, P. Novák, R. Tenzer	2007	On compiling and interpreting anomalous gravity data.	Oral presentation at 7th Slovak Geophysical Conference, June 13–14, 2007, Bratislava.	
431	NP	Koohzare, A., P. Vaníček., and M. Santos	2007	Geodetic modeling and geophysical interpretation of recent vertical crustal movements and gravity changes over Canada,	Oral presentation to Twenty fourth assembly of IUGG, Perugia, July 2–13.	
432	NP	Hatam, Y., Y. Djamour, P. Vaníček, R. Bayer, M. Mohammad Karim, A. M. Abolghasem, M. Najafi Alamdari, R. Saadat, H. Cheraghi, S. Rafiey, S. Arabi, H. Nankali, S. Hoseini	2007	Designing and Implementation of the Multi-purpose Physical Geodesy and Geodynamics Network of (MPGGNI2005),	Poster presentation, Twenty fourth assembly of IUGG, Perugia, July 2–13.	
433	NP	Tenzer, R., A. Ellmann, P. Novák, P. Vajda, P. Vaníček, P. Moore	2007	The Earth's gravity field components of the differences between gravity disturbances and gravity anomalies.	Poster presentation, Twenty fourth assembly of IUGG, Perugia, July 2–13.	
434	NP	Blitzkow, D., A.C.O.C. de Matos, I. De Oliveira Campos, A. Ellmann, P. Vaníček and M. Santos	2007	An attempt for an Amazon geoid model using Helmert gravity.	Oral presentation to Twenty fourth assembly of IUGG, Perugia, July 2–13.	
435	NP	Vajda P., A. Ellmann, B. Meurers, P. Vaníček, P. Novák, R. Tenzer	2007	On a refined global topographic correction to gravity disturbances.	Oral presentation to Twenty fourth assembly of IUGG, Perugia, July 2–13, 2007.	
436	NP	Kingdon, R., P. Vaníček and M. Santos	2007	Coping with topographical density in three dimensions: an application of forward modeling to orthometric height calculations.	Oral presentation to Twenty fourth assembly of IUGG, Perugia, July 2–13.	
437	NP	Avalos, D., M. C. Santos, P. Vaníček and A. Hernandez	2007	Insight into the Mexican Gravimetric Geoid (GGM05),	Poster presentation to twenty fourth assembly of IUGG, Perugia, July 2–13, 2007. Appeared also in the Proceedings.	
438	PR	Vaníček, P., E. W. Grafarend and M. Berber	2007	Strain invariants,	Journal of Geodesy Vol.82, Nos. 4–5, pp 263–268. doi:10.1007/s00190-007-0175-8.	

== Sources ==
- Santos, Marcelo, ed. (January 2003). Honoring The Academic Life of Petr Vanicek. Fredericton: Department of Geodesy and Geomatics Engineering, University of New Brunswick. pp. 184–219.
