= Petr Vaníček =

Canadian geodesist

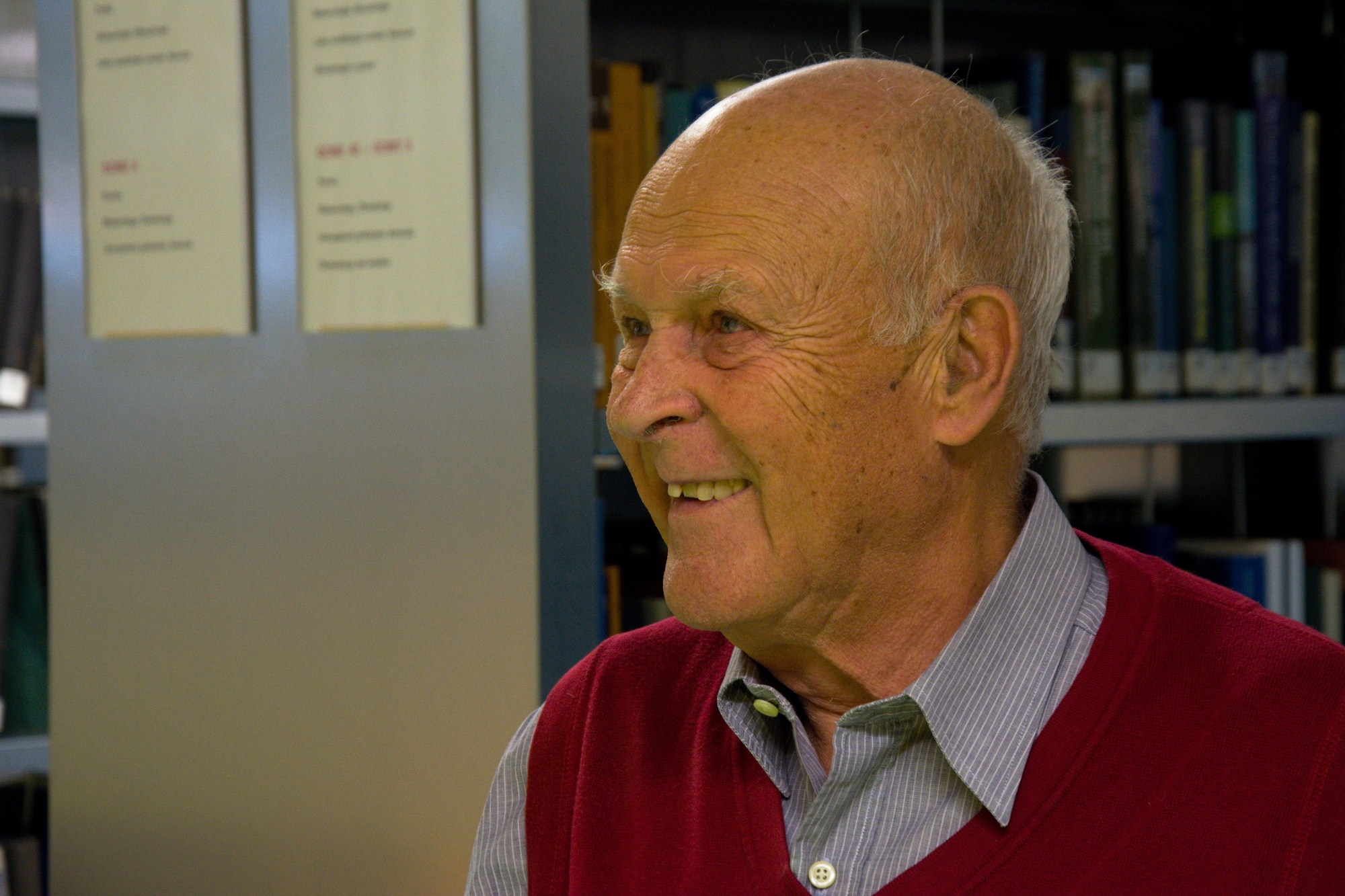
- Born: 18 July 1935 (age 91); Sušice, Czechoslovakia
- Citizenship: Canadian
- Education: Academy of Sciences of the Czech Republic; Czech Technical University
- Known for: Vaníček method Precise Geoid; Canadian Geophysical Union; UN GALOS
- Awards: J. Tuzo Wilson Medal
- Scientific career
- Fields: Geodesy & Geophysics
- Workplaces: Czech Technical University; University of Liverpool; Natural Resources Canada; USGS at Menlo Park; Royal Institute of Technology; University of New Brunswick; University of Toronto; Curtin University
- Thesis: Anharmonic Analysis and Its Applications in Geophysics (1967)
- Academic advisors: Emil Buchar
- Notable students: Attila Komjathy, Caltech; Steven DeLoach, USACE; HE Galo Carrera
- Website: www2.unb.ca/gge/Personnel/Vanicek/Vanicek.html

Petr Vaníček (born 18 July 1935) is a Czech-Canadian geodesist and theoretical geophysicist known for his contributions to spectrum analysis and geoid computation.

== Main contributions ==
=== Research ===
One of Vaníček's main contributions of general relevance is least-squares spectral analysis, also called the Vaníček method and the Gauss-Vaniček method — a frequency spectrum computation method published in 1969 and 1971. It is based on a least-squares fit of sinusoids to the data samples, and mitigates the drawbacks of applying Fourier analysis for analyzing long incomplete data records such as most natural datasets. Unlike with Fourier analysis, data need not be equally spaced to use Vaníček analysis.

His discoveries in theoretical geophysics, the "precise geoid solution" in particular, enable millimetre-to-centimetre accuracy in geoid computation, an-order-of-magnitude improvement from previous solutions.

=== Service ===
Vaníček initiated the establishing of the Canadian Geophysical Union in 1974, and served as the Union's president between 1987 and 1989.

He was the first chairperson of the United Nations committee for Geodetic Aspects of the Law of the Sea (GALOS), founded in Edinburgh, Scotland, by the International Association of Geodesy (IAG) in 1989.

This and other activities led to creation of the technical supplement to the Law of the Sea, TALOS (Manual on Technical Aspects of the United Nations' Convention on the Law of the Sea) in 1982, which is on a regular re-issuing schedule by the UN. The Geodetic Commentary to the TALOS Manual, largely prepared by Vaníček and published by the International Hydrographic Organization in 1996, was incorporated into the Manual.

The book Geodesy: The Concepts, by Vaníček and Krakiwsky, now translated into several languages, is a standard text for both undergraduate and graduate courses in geodesy worldwide.

Vaníček also served as editor-in-chief and peer-reviewer for several scientific journals as well as on numerous scientific boards and committees.

== Awards and recognition ==
=== International ===
Petr Vaníček is a member of the International Union of Geodesy and Geophysics, of the American Geophysical Union, and of the Czechoslovak Society of Arts and Sciences (SVU). He was awarded the Senior Distinguished Scientist Fellowship by the Alexander von Humboldt Foundation, and was a Senior Visiting Scientist with the U.S. National Academy of Sciences.

Over the course of his career, he taught or performed research at universities and labs across six continents, including the Royal Institute of Technology and the USGS.

In 2022 he received the Medal of the Learned Society of the Czech Republic.

=== National ===
Petr Vaníček was awarded the J. Tuzo Wilson Medal in 1996, the highest recognition by the Canadian Geophysical Union, for his outstanding contributions to Canadian geophysics.

== Personal life ==
Since he was born into a typical bourgeois family, Petr Vaníček's wife and children requested to leave Communist Czechoslovakia during the brief but liberal times of Prague Spring. They were granted exit visa just before the Soviet invasion of 1968. The family reunited in England where he was staying on a 1967 Senior Research Fellowship at the University of Liverpool. Together, they immigrated to Canada in 1969. He has one daughter and two sons.

He retired as Professor Emeritus in 2002, after more than thirty years of teaching at the University of Toronto and the University of New Brunswick. He lives in Fredericton, Canada.

== See also ==
- List of geodesists
- List of geophysicists
- Science and technology in Canada

Professional and academic associations
Preceded by David J. Dunlop	President of the Canadian Geophysical Union; 1987–1989	Succeeded by Douglas Edwin Smylie
