= Brian Branfireun =

Canadian environmental scientist

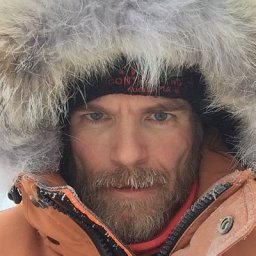
- Citizenship: Canadian
- Education: McGill University
- Awards: Canada Research Chair
- Scientific career
- Fields: hydrology; ecology; biogeochemistry
- Workplaces: Western University; Science Director of Biotron
- Thesis: Catchment-scale hydrology and methylmercury biogeochemistry in the low boreal forest zone of the Precambrian Shield (1999)
- Doctoral advisor: Nigel Roulet
- Website: http://publish.uwo.ca/~bbranfir/Site/Home.html; http://www.ecohydrology.ca/

Brian Branfireun is a Canadian environmental scientist. He held a Canada Research Chair (2010-2020) and is a professor at Western University. He studied climate change and directed a laboratory in Western's Biotron for the study of speciated trace metals in the environment such as mercury and arsenic.

== Scientific research ==
Branfireun's research focused on understanding the bidirectional nature of hydrological-ecological interactions at a range of spatial and temporal scales. His research group directs its efforts toward ecosystems that are particularly sensitive to the impacts of natural and human-induced environmental change.

Branfireun has been involved in projects studying the hydrology, ecology and biogeochemistry of wetland-dominated environments from the Canadian subarctic to the subtropics of Mexico.

== Current work ==
Branfireun and colleagues have been conducting field research with the Grassy Narrows First Nation to learn more about how mercury moves through the environment, ultimately ending up in fish which can result in Minamata disease in humans. The English and Wabigoon River system has poisonous levels of mercury pollution from the Reed Paper company's operation in Dryden, which used mercury in their bleaching process for making paper until 1975. As a result, members of the Grassy Narrows First Nation suffering long-term effects from mercury poisoning are now eligible for Ontario Disability Support Program.

His research has also been cited by indigenous peoples in legal complaints about environmental pollution.

== Career ==
Since 2010 he has been a professor in the Department of Biology and Centre for Environment & Sustainability (joint appointment) with a graduate cross-appointment in Earth Science and Geography at Western University. From 2009-2010 he was a professor at the University of Toronto Mississauga in the Department of Geography.

Branfireun served as the President for the Hydrology Section of the Canadian Geophysical Union and also served as the Canadian National Correspondent for Water Quality with the International Association of Hydrological Sciences.

Branfireun was one of the organizers of the 2011 Mercury Conference in Halifax, Nova Scotia.

His thesis at McGill studied methylmercury biogeochemistry.

Professional and academic associations
| Preceded by Gail Atkinson | President of the Canadian Geophysical Union; 2013-2015 | Succeeded by Claire Samson |
