= Biotron (Western University) =

Climate research laboratory in Canada

The Biotron Institute for Experimental Climate Change Research
- The International Biotron

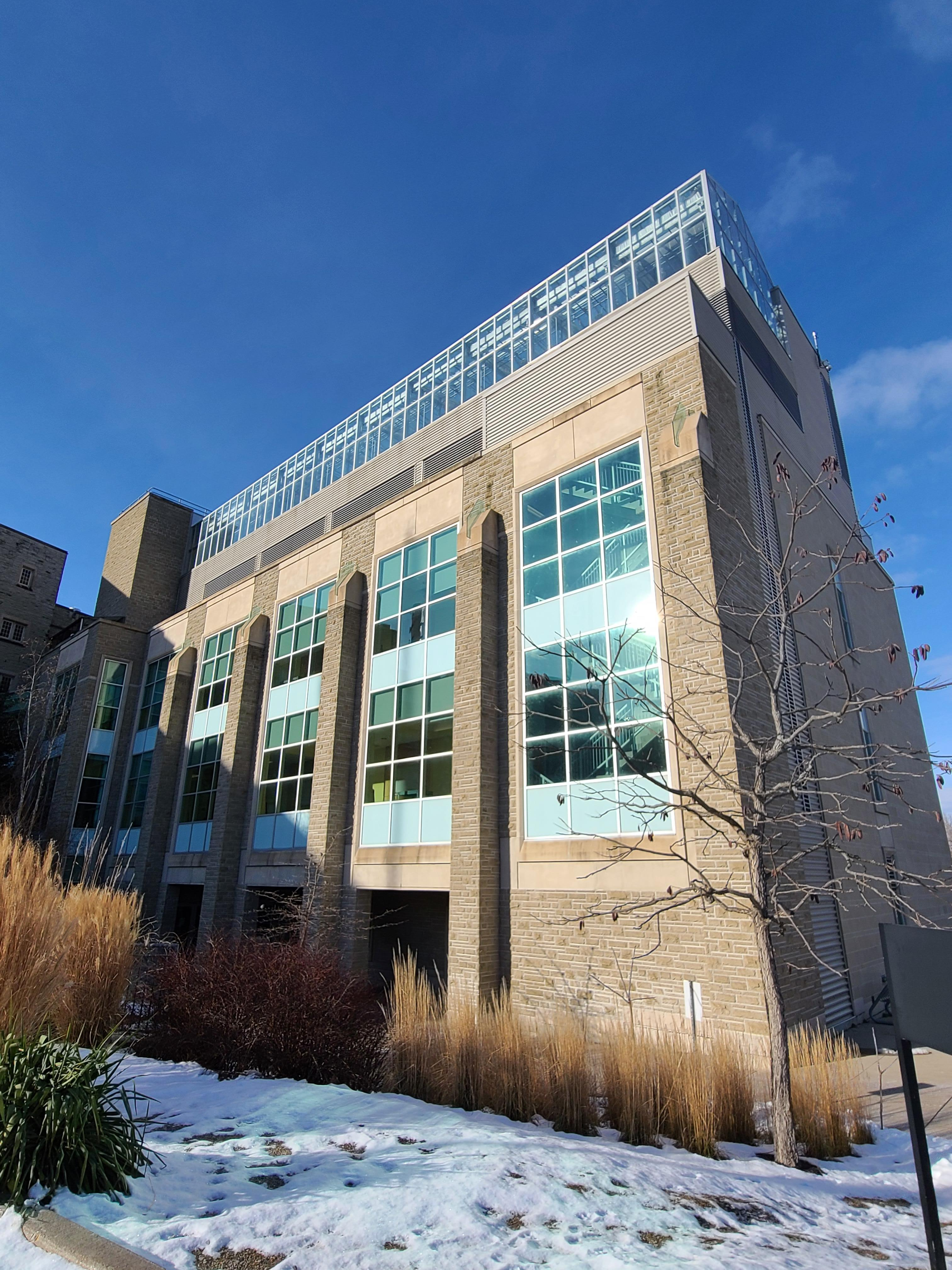
- Established: September 2008; 17 years ago
- Research type: basic & applied
- Director: Norman Hüner
- Location: 1151 Richmond Street, London, Ontario, N6A 5B7, Canada; 43.011260°N 81.271707°W
- Website: www.uwo.ca/sci/research/biotron/
- Location within Ontario

The Biotron Institute for Experimental Climate Change Research at Western University in London, Ontario is a facility constructed to simulate ecosystems and funded by the Canadian government to study how plants, microbes and insects sense and adjust to climate change. Its biome chambers allow control of temperature, humidity and sunlight so that scientists can simulate climatic zones from rainforests to Arctic tundra. This enables the study environmental science, biotech, materials and biomaterials in realistic environmental conditions while still in a controlled laboratory setting. The Biotron also trains students, including one of Western's winners of The Undergraduate Awards' Global Award.

== History ==
The lab was initially founded by Norman Hüner with a grant from the Canadian Foundation for Innovation in May 2003. Construction was completed in 2008, and like many research facilities, it struggled to establish a business model to support the technicians needed to operate its specialized equipment. The facility is now part of the department of biology.

The facility has had three directors: Norman Hüner (2003-2008, 2019-present), Jeremy McNeil (2009-2011), and Brian Branfireun (2012-2019).

== Research ==
Hüner and colleagues observed that 80% of Earth's biosphere is permanently below 5°C, including most of the oceans and the polar and alpine regions. Previously, these regions had been assumed to be low in biodiversity, when in fact they are teeming with diverse life forms. The facility now supports research ranging from biogeochemistry to the study of insects in cold temperatures.

=== Environmental Chambers ===
The Biotron's chambers augment polar research stations by enabling research on cold ecosystems in a controlled laboratory building. Biotron's chambers enable the study of biomes, such as peatlands, and insects, such as the overwintering energetics of butterflies. These chambers enable the study of climate change by simulating Arctic conditions in the laboratory.

=== Analytical Services ===
Biotron's analytical laboratories measure trace metals in samples from field collections. The facility provides mass spectrometry for measuring elements and compounds in water, soil, rock and biological materials. The facility has been used to study of pollutants that impact human health, such as the neurotoxin mercury. Such studies enable biomonitoring to support the rights of indigenous peoples. Biotron's analytical services also support global carbon cycle modeling and medical clinical trials.
