= Gail Atkinson =

Canadian seismologist

- Born: 1957 (age 68–69); Canada
- Occupations: seismologist, academic
- Awards: 2016 J. Tuzo Wilson Medal

Academic background
- Education: BSc, Physics and Geology, 1978, Carleton University; MEngSc, Civil Engineering, 1980, PhD, 1993, University of Western Ontario
- Thesis: Seismic risk in northern Canada and applications to pipeline projects (1993)

Gail Marie Atkinson (born 1957) is a Canadian seismologist. She is a former professor at the University of Western Ontario and Canada Research Chair in Earthquake Hazards and Ground Motions. In 2014, Atkinson was elected a Fellow of the Royal Society of Canada for being an "international leader in the development of models to predict earthquake ground motions as a function of magnitude and distance."

== Early life and education ==
Atkinson was born in 1957. She completed her Bachelor of Science degree in geology and physics from Carleton University in 1978 before earning her master's degree in civil engineering at the University of Western Ontario. Following her graduate degree, Atkinson worked with Klohn Leonoff Consulting Engineers and Acres International Ltd and held research fellowships with the University of British Columbia and the Geological Survey of Canada. She eventually returned to UWO for her PhD in geophysics, which she received in 1993.

== Career ==
Upon completing her PhD, Atkinson accepted a faculty position teaching earth sciences at Carleton University. In this role, she analyzed dams, power plants and other buildings across North America to determine their earthquake readiness. In 2001, she received funding to create a national rapid-warning system for potentially destructive earthquakes. In order to establish this system, she oversaw the implementation of a series of 90 seismic probes buried in strategic locations across Canada, each connected by satellite to data centres. During this time, she was also serving as president of Polaris, a joint venture involving government, industry, utilities, and five universities. By 2004, Atkinson's research team installed 70 seismic devices in Ontario, British Columbia and the Northwest Territories. As a result of her efforts, Atkinson received one of Ontario Premier's Research Excellence Awards.

Atkinson remained at Carleton until 2007 when she accepted became the Canada Research Chair in Earthquake Hazards and Ground Motions at the University of Western Ontario. Shortly after accepting this role, Atkinson was named the 2007 William B. Joyner Memorial Lecturer from the Seismological Society of America. In 2010, she partook in a nation-wide study looking at seismic hazards following the 2010 Central Canada earthquake. As a result of her interests into earthquakes, Atkinson partnered with the Natural Sciences and Engineering Research Council, TransAlta, and Nanometrics to establish a multi-institutional collaborative research program on Induced Seismicity Processes and Hazards.

In 2014, Atkinson was elected a Fellow of the Royal Society of Canada for being an "international leader in the development of models to predict earthquake ground motions as a function of magnitude and distance." Two years later, she was the recipient of the 2016 J. Tuzo Wilson Medal as someone who had made an outstanding contribution to the field of geophysics in Canada. In 2018, Atkinson was awarded the Hellmuth Prize for Achievement in Research for her research at the engineering-seismology interface.

In 2020, Atkinson was recognized with the Harry Fielding Reid Medal for her seminal contributions in engineering seismology, especially regarding ground motion characterization. She later retired the same year and moved to British Columbia.

== Personal life ==
Atkinson and her husband have two children together.

Professional and academic associations
Preceded by Spiros Pagiatakis	President of the Canadian Geophysical Union; 2011–2013	Succeeded by Brian Branfireun
