= William Richard Peltier =

Canadian geophysicist

William Richard Peltier FRSC
- Citizenship: Canadian
- Education: University of British Columbia, University of Toronto
- Known for: Mathematical models of ice sheets
- Awards: Vetlesen Prize
- Scientific career
- Fields: geodynamics, oceanography, atmospheric sciences, climate change
- Workplaces: University of Toronto
- Thesis: Thermal Stability of non-Boussinesq Configurations (1971)
- Doctoral advisor: Colin O. Hines
- Website: www.atmosp.physics.utoronto.ca/~peltier/

William Richard Peltier, FRSC, (born 1943), is university professor of physics at the University of Toronto. He is director of the Centre for Global Change Science, past principal investigator of the Polar Climate Stability Network, and the scientific director of Canada's largest supercomputer centre, SciNet. He is a fellow of the Royal Society of Canada, of the American Geophysical Union, of the American Meteorological Society, and of the Norwegian Academy of Science and Letters.

Peltier's research interests include: atmospheric and oceanic waves and turbulence, geophysical fluid dynamics, physics of the planetary interior, and planetary climate.

Peltier is notable for his seminal contributions to the understanding of the dynamics of the deep Earth, both concerning the nature of the mantle convection process and the circulation of the visco-elastic interior caused by the loading of the surface by continental scale ice sheet loads. His gravitationally self-consistent global theory of Ice-Earth-Ocean interactions has become widely employed internationally in the explanation of the changes of sea level that accompany both the growth and decay of grounded ice on the continents, both during the Late Quaternary era of Earth history and under modern global warming conditions. His models of the space-time variations of continental ice cover since the last maximum of glaciation are employed universally to provide the boundary conditions needed to enable modern coupled climate models to be employed to reconstruct past climate conditions. A most notable contribution to work of this kind has been his theory of the so-called Dansgaard-Oeschger millennial timescale oscillation of glacial climate. He has been the primary contributor to the global reconstructions ICE-3G, ICE-4G, ICE-5G (VM2), and the most recent ICE-6G (VM5)model. These models are important for the quantification of post-glacial rebound and late Pleistocene to Holocene variations in sea level.

== Career ==
While pursuing a college education in physics, Peltier supported himself by working for a geological firm, staking mineral claims in the Northwest Territories. He later said that the high density of black flies drove him to be a theorist. After getting his undergraduate degree at the University of British Columbia, he went to the University of Toronto for his masters and Ph.D where he worked on the problem of mantle convection with Colin Hines as his graduate advisor.

After Peltier graduated in 1971, Hines arranged a postdoctoral fellowship for him at the Cooperative Institute for Research in Environmental Sciences at the University of Colorado Boulder. There he met W. E. (Bill) Farrell, who was working on the deformation of an elastic Earth due to the tidally varying pressure of the oceans. Farrell encouraged Peltier to work on a related problem, glacial isostatic adjustment.

Glacial isostatic adjustment (GIA) is the response of the Earth to changing loads as glaciers advance and retreat. On time scales of hundreds of thousand of years, Earth's lithosphere behaves as if it is floating on the mantle, and given enough time it achieves a state of isostasy where denser material sinks and lighter material rises to balance the gravitational load. However, when a large load such as a glacier is added, it presses the lithosphere down; and when it melts away, the lithosphere rises, a phenomenon known as post-glacial rebound. After the most recent ice age, some parts of Canada and Scandinavia have rebounded by nearly 300 meters and are still rising (relative to sea level) at several millimeters per year. The rate of adjustment is slow because the Earth's mantle has a high viscosity. Peltier was already aware from his doctoral work that models of mantle convection required a good estimate of viscosity, and he realized that this could be obtained from an analysis of GIA. Modeling the Earth as a Maxwell solid, an incompressible material with both viscosity and elasticity, he showed that a correspondence principle could be used to reduce the viscoelastic problem to the simpler elastic problem.

During this period, Peltier also worked on the geophysical fluid dynamics of the atmosphere, studying internal waves in the jet stream and oceanic boundary currents. In a 1976 paper with Hines he proposed monitoring the ionosphere to detect tsunamis; thirty years later, when GPS systems became available, there was a resurgence of interest in this idea.

Aside from visiting appointments and sabbaticals, Peltier has spent his entire career at the University of Toronto (U of T). In 1977, he was granted tenure, in 1979 he became a full professor, and in 1993 he was appointed University Professor. This is the highest academic title at U of T, held by at most 2 percent of tenured faculty. He has had sabbaticals at the University of Cambridge, the National Center for Atmospheric Research in Boulder, and the Institut de Physique du Globe de Paris.

== Publications ==
Peltier has published over 280 peer-reviewed papers for a total of over 32,000 citations and an h-index of 87. In 2001, Science Watch analyzed citation data from Essential Science Indicators and found that Peltier was the fifth most cited researcher in the geosciences for 1991 to 2001. Some of his papers are:

- Peltier, W. R. (1974). "The impulse response of a Maxwell Earth". Reviews of Geophysics. 12 (4): 649. doi:10.1029/RG012i004p00649.
- Peltier, W. R.; Andrews, J. T. (2 April 2007). "Glacial-Isostatic Adjustment-I. The Forward Problem". Geophysical Journal of the Royal Astronomical Society. 46 (3): 605–646. doi:10.1111/j.1365-246X.1976.tb01251.x.
- Tushingham, A. M.; Peltier, W. R. (10 March 1991). "Ice-3G: A new global model of Late Pleistocene deglaciation based upon geophysical predictions of post-glacial relative sea level change". Journal of Geophysical Research: Solid Earth. 96 (B3): 4497–4523. Bibcode:1991JGR....96.4497T. doi:10.1029/90JB01583.
- Peltier, W. Richard (8 July 1994). "Ice age paleotopography". Science. 265 (5169): 195–201. Bibcode:1994Sci...265..195P. doi:10.1126/science.265.5169.195. JSTOR 2884168. PMID 17750657. S2CID 29508590.
- Peltier, W.R. (19 May 2004). "Global glacial isostasy and the surface of the ice-age Earth: the ICE-5G (VM2) model and GRACE". Annual Review of Earth and Planetary Sciences. 32 (1): 111–149. Bibcode:2004AREPS..32..111P. doi:10.1146/annurev.earth.32.082503.144359.
- Peltier, W.R.; Fairbanks, R.G. (December 2006). "Global glacial ice volume and Last Glacial Maximum duration from an extended Barbados sea level record". Quaternary Science Reviews. 25 (23–24): 3322–3337. doi:10.1016/j.quascirev.2006.04.010.
- Shackleton, N. J.; Berger, A.; Peltier, W. R. (3 November 2011). "An alternative astronomical calibration of the lower Pleistocene timescale based on ODP Site 677". Transactions of the Royal Society of Edinburgh: Earth Sciences. 81 (4): 251–261. doi:10.1017/S0263593300020782.
- Peltier, W.R.; Argus, D.F.; Drummond, R (January 2015). "Space geodesy constrains ice age terminal deglaciation: The global ICE‐6G_C (VM5a) model". Journal of Geophysical Research: Solid Earth. 120 (1): 450–487. doi:10.1002/2014JB011176.

== Honours and awards ==
- Fellow of the Royal Society of Canada, 1986
- In 1991, awarded the Patterson Medal by the Canadian Meteorological and Oceanographic Society for distinguished service to meteorology.
- Distinguished Lecturer of the Canadian Geophysical Union, 1999–2000
- Elected as Foreign Member to Fellowship in the Norwegian Academy of Science and Letters, 2004
- Bancroft Award of the Royal Society of Canada, 2004
- J. Tuzo Wilson Medal of the Canadian Geophysical Union, 2004
- Vetlesen Prize, 2004
- Leiv Erikson Fellow, Norwegian Research Council, Bjerknes Institute for Climate Research, Univ. of Bergen, 2006
- Miroslaw Romanowski Medal of the Royal Society of Canada, 2006
- honorary Doctor of Science from the University of Waterloo, 2007
- Milutin Milankovic Medal of the European Geosciences Union, 2008
- Medal for Lifetime Achievement in Physics, Canadian Association of Physicists, 2009
- Bower Award and Prize for Achievement in Science of The Franklin Institute, 2010
- Charles A. Whitten Medal, American Geophysical Union, 2010
- Gerhard Herzberg Canada Gold Medal for Science and Engineering, Natural Sciences and Engineering Research Council, 2011
- Izaak-Walton-Killam Award, Canada Council for the Arts, 2013
- W. A. Johnston Award from the Canadian Quaternary Association (CANQUA), 2018
- Gold Medal and Fellow of the International Union of Geodesy and Geophysics (IUGG), 2019

== See also ==
- List of University of Waterloo people
- List of geophysicists
