= J. Tuzo Wilson Medal =

Award of the Canadian Geophysical Union

The J. Tuzo Wilson Medal is given out annually by the Canadian Geophysical Union to recognize scientists who have made an outstanding contribution to the field of geophysics in Canada. Factors taken into account in the selection process include excellence in scientific or technical research, instrument development, industrial applications and/or teaching. The award was created in 1978 and named after its first recipient, John Tuzo Wilson.

== Past recipients ==
Source: CGU

- 1978 – John Tuzo Wilson
- 1979 – Roy O. Lindseth
- 1980 – Larry W. Morley
- 1981 – George D. Garland
- 1982 – J.A. Jacobs
- 1983 – D. Ian Gough
- 1984 – Ted Irving
- 1985 – Harold O. Seigel
- 1986 – Mike Rochester
- 1987 – David Strangway
- 1988 – Ernie Kanesewich
- 1989 – Leonard S. Collett
- 1990 – Gordon F. West
- 1991 – Thomas Edvard Krogh
- 1992 – R. Don Russel
- 1993 – Alan E. Beck
- 1994 – Michael J. Berry
- 1995 – Charlotte E. Keen
- 1996 – Petr Vaníček
- 1997 – Chris Beaumount
- 1998 – Ronald M. Clowes
- 1999 – David J. Dunlop
- 2000 – Donald M. Gray
- 2001 – Roy D. Hyndman
- 2002 – Doug E. Smylie
- 2003 – Garry K.C. Clarke
- 2004 – Dick Peltier
- 2005 – Ted Evans
- 2006 – Alan Jones
- 2007 – Herb Dragert
- 2008 – Ming-ko (Hok) Woo
- 2009 – Garth van der Kamp
- 2010 – Nigel Edwards
- 2011 – Fred Cook
- 2012 – Douglas W. Oldenburg
- 2013 – Zoltan Hajnal
- 2014 – Philip Marsh
- 2015 – Kelin Wang
- 2016 – Gail Atkinson
- 2017 - John Pomeroy
- 2018 - Gary Jarvis
- 2019 - Patrick Wu
- 2020 - David Eaton
- 2021 - Jim Buttle
- 2022 - Philippe Van Cappellen
- 2023 - No recipient
- 2024 - Spiros Pagiatakis
- 2025 - Masaki Hayashi

== See also ==
- List of geology awards
- List of geophysics awards
- List of physics awards
