= Galo Carrera =

His Excellency Galo Carrera Hurtado
- Born: August 19, 1953 (age 73)
- Education: University of New Brunswick
- Occupations: United Nations official Ministerial Advisor; Technical Advisor; Special Advisor; University professor Academic researcher
- Years active: 1987–present
- Employer: World Maritime University
- Known for: International tribunals expert UN demarcation expert
- Title: Honorary Consul of Mexico
- Term: 1995–present
- Board member of: UN ABLOS; Oceans Institute of Canada
- Spouse: Martha Carrera
- Website: wmu.se/people/galo-carrera

Galo Carrera Hurtado (born 19 August 1953 in Mexico) is serving as an Honorary Consul of Mexico to Canada. He is a research associate for marine affairs at Dalhousie University in Halifax, Canada, a visiting professor at the World Maritime University in Malmö, Sweden, and a Fellow of the International Association of Geodesy. He has authored and coauthored nearly 200 scientific articles and technical reports, and has presented papers and made scholarly addresses at international conferences, seminars and courses on five continents.

He is a veteran UN maritime demarcation expert in the Law of the Sea, and was in 2010 appointed the chairman of the UN Commission on the Limits of the Continental Shelf. He served as the secretary of the UN committee for Geodetic Aspects of the Law of the Sea (GALOS), as well as a member of the UN Advisory Board on the Law of the Sea (ABLOS).

He has been consulted by governments on matters concerning maritime delineation, so he acted as ministerial advisor to: Commonwealth Secretariat of United Kingdom, Department of Foreign Affairs of Philippines, National Boundary Commission of Nigeria, Ministry of Foreign Affairs of Oman, Executive Branch (COALEP) of Uruguay, Ministry of Lands and Resettlement of Namibia, Department of Foreign Affairs of Grenada, Ministry of Justice of Republic of Angola, Ministry of Foreign Affairs of Guyana, Department of Foreign Relations (SRE) of Mexico, Ministry of Foreign Affairs of Jamaica, Ministry of Land Use and Habitat of the Seychelles, South Pacific Forum Fisheries Agency of Solomon Islands, Foreign Ministry of Kingdom of Tonga, Maritime Agency of Sierra Leone, and Petroleum Directorate of the Province of Nova Scotia in Canada.

Besides his involvement in international maritime affairs, he has also acted as the special advisor in the 2002 inter-Canadian delineation case concerning right-of-access to marine oil reserves, between Newfoundland and Labrador on one side, and Nova Scotia on the other.

As a UN official, he has been involved in resolving maritime disputes such as the 2012 dispute between Taiwan, China and Japan.
