= The Undergraduate Awards =

Academic prize awarded yearly in Dublin, Ireland

The Global Undergraduate Awards
- Country: Ireland
- First award: 2008; 18 years ago
- Website: www.undergraduateawards.com

The Global Undergraduate Awards (often referred to as the Junior Nobel Prize) is an academic awards program recognising outstanding undergraduate coursework and research. Established to highlight the world's most innovative student projects and foster interdisciplinary collaboration, it is widely recognized as the world's largest academic awards program of its kind, evaluating thousands of submissions from hundreds of universities internationally. Prizes are awarded across 25 diverse academic disciplines by a non-profit organisation operating under the patronage of the President of Ireland, Michael D. Higgins. The program culminates each year at the three-day Global Undergraduate Summit in Dublin, Ireland. During this event, top-performing students are invited to present their research, participate in academic workshops, and network with peers, while the highest-performing entrants in each category are named Global Winners and receive the Thomas Clarkson Gold Medal.

== History ==
The Global Undergraduate Awards (UA) was founded in 2008 in Dublin as The Undergraduate Awards. The programme was originally open to students from Ireland's universities.

In 2012, UA expanded to accept submissions from every Third Level Institution on the Island of Ireland as well as the top twenty universities in Britain, USA and Canada.

In 2016, the UA Programme was split into seven regions: Africa & Middle East, Asia, Europe, Island of Ireland, Latin America, Oceania, US & Canada.

== Process ==
Entrants submit their work to one of 25 categories, which represent a wide range of academic disciplines: Architecture & Design, Art History & Theory, Business, Chemical & Pharmaceutical Sciences, Classical Studies & Archaeology, Computer Sciences, Earth & Environmental Sciences, Economics, Education, Engineering, History, Linguistics, Law, Life Sciences, Literature, Mathematics & Physics, Medical Sciences, Music, Film & Theatre, Nursing, Midwifery & Allied Healthcare, Philosophy, Politics & International Relations, Psychology, Anthropology & Cultural Studies, Sociology & Social Policy and Visual Arts.

The submissions are evaluated anonymously by a group of international academics. The top 10% of entries from each region in each category are named Highly Commended. The highest performing Highly Commended entrant from each region is named a Regional Winner of their category, while the best Highly Commended Entrant is named the Global Winner.

== Global Winners ==
Entrants whose submission is selected as the best in their category are named Global Winners. These winners are invited to present their work in Dublin at the Global Undergraduate Awards Summit. Each winner is awarded with a gold medal.

| Category | Global Winner 2025 | Global Winner 2024 | Global Winner 2023 | Global Winner 2022 | Global Winner 2021 | Global Winner 2020 | Global Winner 2019 | Global Winner 2018 | Global Winner 2017 |
|---|---|---|---|---|---|---|---|---|---|
| Architecture & Design | Ridwan Noor | Sara Al Mahmoud & Maryam Al Qassim | Sadrila Abbasi | Zareen Tasneem Sharif | Riad Tabbara | Aishwarya Sriram | Prathyush Pradeep | Karen El Asmar | Martha Andrews |
| Art History & Theory | Bryen Isaac Chen Tze-Yang | Amelia Ong Tsi Ying | Jessie Lim | Sahil Tiku | Piper Prolago | Zoe Voice | Claudia Haines | Jun Yan Chua | Eden Gelgoot |
| Business | Cameron Schmidt | Beverley Cheah | Tulip Yu Lay Ong | Katie McGrath | Jill Humby | Shawn Liu | Xi Ning Seet | Brian Heffernan | Robert Sarich |
| Chemical & Pharmaceutical Sciences | Clarissa Joanna Lim | Christy Yu-Qing Xie | Thuy Linh Le | Oliver Hervir | Ali Abdelfadil | Jingfei Ren | Kang Rui Garrick Lim | Li Ling Tan | Phillip Karpati |
| Classical Studies & Archaeology | Jadyn Faith Zajac | James Kenneth | James Kenneth | Maggie Tighe | Emily Kerrison | Edward Foster | Juhi Patel | Amelia Halls | Melanie Hechenberger |
| Computer Science | Yong Jian Ng | Bruno Rafael Florentino | Pye Sone Kyaw | Guruprerana Shabadi | Chen Sihao | Kayo Yin | Harry She | Cristian Bodnar | Dinh Luan Nguyen |
| Earth & Environmental Sciences | Maria Cooper | Joshua Hurdiss | Yong Xu Leong | Kenna White | Yilin Zhang | Alice Walker | Amy Campbell | Lyndsay Walsh | Bridget Murphy |
| Economics | Cameron Schmidt | Beverley Cheah | Alexander Gilsaa Hansen | Victor Sosanya | Beatriz Sasse | Ishita Kumar | Stefan Pricopie | Shamus Lee | Daniel Cueva |
| Education | Shaikha Yousef Mohammed Rahmah Alshamsi | Alethea Yeo Yen Ning | Hong Liang Lee | Matthew Gover | Roxanne Lau | Pearlwe Chau | Laura DeSousa | Sylvia Lee | Farhana Choudhury |
| Engineering | Balvinder Kaur Dhillon | Balvinder Kaur Dhillon | Thompho Netshivhera | Bailey Thompson, Bruce Gillespie, Adam Kidd & Parth Vachharajani | Lim Si Xian | Febby Krisnadi | Aayush Chadha | Michaela Taylor-Williams | Amber Tan |
| History | Waron Maneenetr | Koh Horn Ray | Olivia Skipsey | Calvin Heng | Hannah Kern-Cheng | Keith Ó Riain | Lauren Goodall | Matthew Barton | |
| Law | Leana Shin | Anne White O'Brien | Katherine Kingsley-Jones | Julia Best | Amrita Deshmukh | Genevieve Ding | Andrew Ray | Melany Toombs | Kathy Liu |
| Life Sciences | Raegan Cordelia Sim | Sean Phang Kia Ann | Chun-Pei Wu | Alex Qin | Jenny Gehlen | Migara Jayasinghe | Emma Darbinian | Pascale Wehr | Jamie Sugrue |
| Linguistics | Rachel Wee Hui Ying | Judit Casas i Riu | Emily Udle | Elaine Wai Man Mok | Oisín Nolan | Chau Yi Cheung | Xin Qi | Jessica Ramos-Sanchez | Alexandra Brito |
| Literature | Bryen Isaac Chen Tze-Yang | Nurul Syahirah Nadirah Binte Noorrisham | Liam Waterman | Dylan Chng | Dylan Chng | Liam Whelan | Marta Meazza | Patrick Lillie | Noah Fields |
| Mass Communications | Michael Chow | Hongshu Wang | | | | | | | |
| Mathematics & Physics | Nikolai Argatoff | Mikko Seppälä | Netta Karjalainen | Vincent Sietses | Hongjia Chen | Xi Jie Yeo | Wen Yu Kon | Alexander Zagajewski | Jeremy Lim Zhen Jie |
| Medical Sciences | Emilia Herdes | Muriel Heitsch | Julie Cheung | Leighton Schreyer | Delia-Denisa Dunca | Hailey Dall-Proud | Tara Diviney | Tiffany Ni | Clara Nwe Nwe Linn Oo |
| Music, Film & Theatre | Madison Torkoff | Rosina Lui | Bethany Schaufler-Biback | Allison Kinahan | Sher Yao | Adam Weitzer | Jay Millard | Rosalind Moran | |
| Nursing, Midwifery & Allied Healthcare | Tung Kin Chong Colin | Richard Croft | Tan Hui Qing | Seow Ting Low | Hilary Y.M. Pang | Emily Dingley | Susan Williams | Emily Morrison | Amy Lewis |
| Philosophy | Rían Coady | Rachael Louise Li | Nathalie DiBerardino | Franciszek Bryk | Young-il Kim | Harriet Yates | Woojin Lim | James Monaghan | Tadgh Healy |
| Politics & International Relations | Bavan Pushpalingam | Kai Ingot Damai Siallagan | Justin Khouw | Identity/Context | Ng Yi Ming | Jasper Friedrich | Nonyeleze Irukwu | Laura Trad | |
| Psychology | Angel Yee Fong Au | Diana Urian | Meryl Yu | Alexis Wong | Stephanie Yu | Catherine Li | Win Ee Chun | Natalya Jia Yu Wickramisuriya | Jordan Tilda Skrynka |
| Social Sciences: Anthropology & Cultural Studies | Bavan Pushpalingam | Avery Huang | Terina Kaire-Gataulu | Alexander Avila | Beth Hayes | Nathaniel Dylan Lim | Yume Tamiya | Istifaa Ahmed | Alex Longson |
| Social Sciences: Sociology & Social Policy | Claire Lee Si Hui | Ng Si Jie, Elizabeth | Christie Soo | Lynda Li | Arizona Haddon | Maya Bian | Madelaine Coelho | Isobel Howlett | Sarah McKenna |
| Visual Arts | Brigette Teo & Nicky Josephine Tjandra | Evie Rose Thornton | Arian Saghafifar | Dana Leslie | Afnan Albladi | Benjamin Crocker | Ying Li Toh | Yi Xian Issa Sng | Vivienne Molloy |
