= Canadian Geophysical Union =

Canadian learned society

- Abbreviation: CGU (UGC in French)
- Formation: 1974
- Type: Learned society
- Legal status: Not-for-profit organization
- Headquarters: Montreal, Quebec, Canada
- Region served: Canada
- Members: 500
- Official languages: English; French
- President: Andrew Ireson
- Vice President: Claire Oswald
- Main organ: Executive Board
- Affiliations: International Union of Geodesy and Geophysics (IUGG); Canadian Societies for the Geophysical Sciences (CSGS)
- Website: www.cgu-ugc.ca

The Canadian Geophysical Union (French: Union géophysique canadienne) (CGU) is a society dedicated to the study of Earth and its space environment, including the Sun and solar system.

== History ==
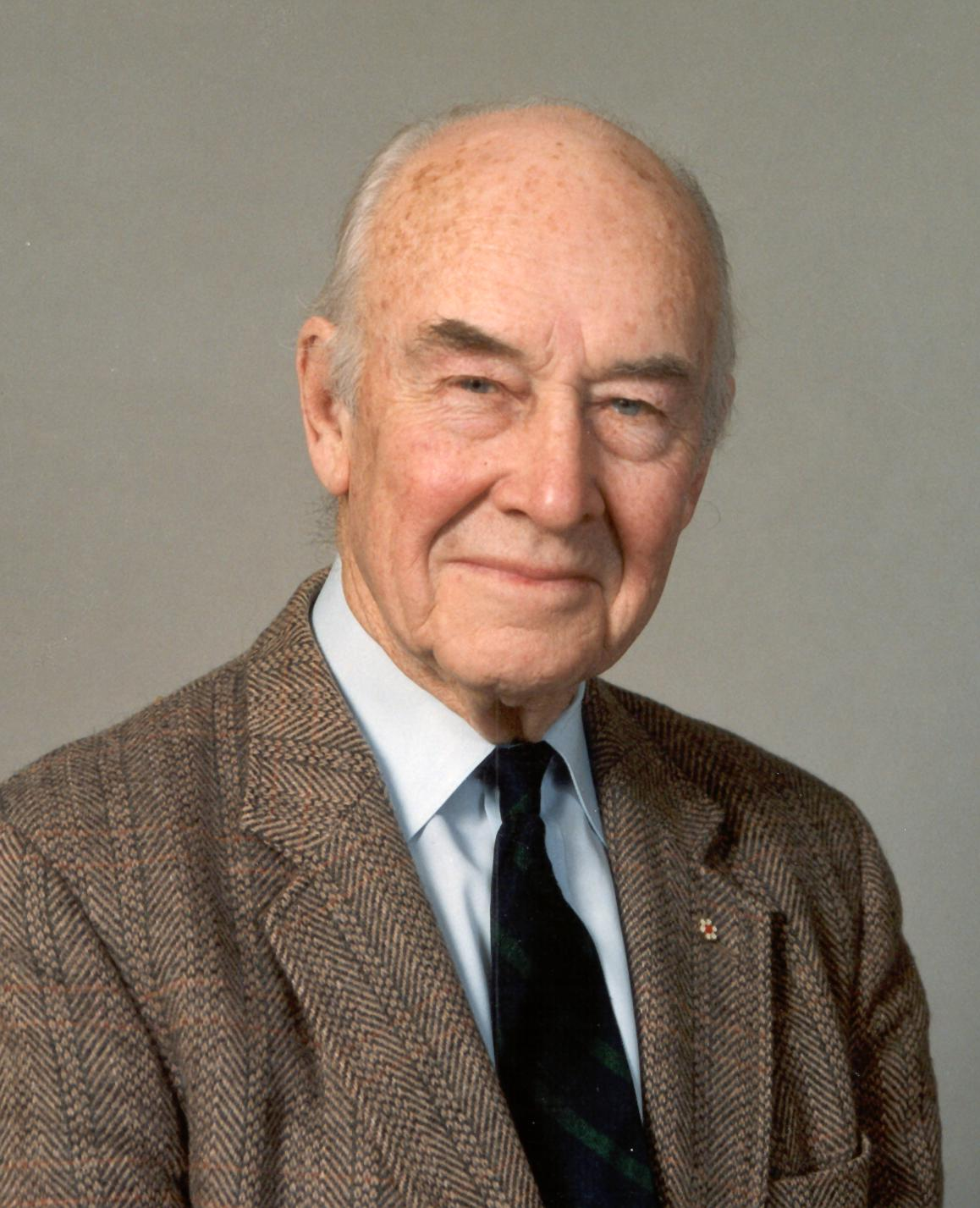
John Tuzo Wilson (1908–1993)

The organization began in 1945 as an Associate Committee of the National Research Council Canada. It amalgamated with the Canadian committee for the International Union of Geodesy and Geophysics in 1946 and was renamed as the Associate Committee of Geodesy and Geophysics of the NRC. The organization was replaced in 1974 by the Canadian Geophysical Union with John Tuzo Wilson as its first president. It became an independent organization in 1988 and now has avout 500 members.

== Awards ==
The CGU awards the annual J. Tuzo Wilson Medal, named in honour of Canadian geophysicist John Tuzo Wilson. the CGU also annually awards the Young Scientist Award and the Meritorious Service Award. Seven Student Awards are also bestowed annually.

== See also ==
- Natural scientific research in Canada
- List of geoscience organizations
- National Geographic Society
