= Caminalcules =

Conceptual lifeforms to assist in understanding phylogenrtics

Eight of the Caminalcules

Caminalcules are a fictive group of animal-like life forms, which were created as a tool for better understanding phylogenetics in real organisms. They were created by Joseph H. Camin (University of Kansas) and consist of 29 living 'species' and 48 fossil forms.

The name of the taxon Caminalcules seems to come from Camin's last name and Antonie van Leeuwenhoek's animalcules.

== History ==
Joseph H. Camin (1922–1979) drew the Caminalcules in the early 1960s or possibly even earlier to study the nature of taxonomic judgement. He assured that there was genetic continuity in the Caminalcules by the preservation of all characters except for changes that he desired in all successive animals. He did not keep track of the changes he made in the different species. The images of the Caminalcules were made using master stencils. The images of the living OTUs (29 species) were made available in the early 1960s; those of the fossil ones (48 species) later in the decade. These images were copied using xerography. Copies of all OTUs were in the possession of Dr. Paul A. Ehrlich (Stanford University), Dr. W. Wayne Moss (Philadelphia Academy of Sciences) and Robert R. Sokal (State University of New York at Stony Brook) in 1983. The original drawings by Joseph H. Camin have unfortunately been lost.

The Caminalcules first appeared in print in the journal Systematic Zoology (now Systematic Biology) in 1983, four years after Camin's death in 1979. Robert R. Sokal published four succeeding papers about them, titled "A Phylogenetic Analysis of the Caminalcules." These papers included the complete set of living and fossil species, as well as their cladogram, which Sokal had received from Camin in 1970.

At a symposium dedicated to Camin, Dr. W. Wayne Moss said that "his collaborative studies on methods and principles of systematics at Kansas in the 1960s resulted in the appearance of that delightful taxon, the Caminalcules", and that "his thoughts helped to launch the infant field of phenetics and cladistics in North America". This quote demonstrates the importance of the Caminalcules for the field of phylogenetics.

Ulrich Wirth introduced also the fictive animal group Didaktozoa in 1993, which was inspired by rotifers. According to Ulrich, the Didaktozoa are handier than the Caminalcules and were created in a way that more biologists would agree with, since phenomena such as homologous structures, apomorphy and organ reduction were taken into account in their creation.

== Use in assessment and development of taxonomic methods ==
The Caminalcules have a known phylogeny, whereas for real organisms it is generally impossible to obtain one. Therefore, Camin expected that they would be useful in evaluating different taxonomic techniques, such as phenetic and cladistic analysis. This was indeed the case; for example, Robert R. Sokal used the Caminalcules to investigate the ability of different numerical methods to estimate the true cladogram as well as the consequences of introducing fossil species into a data set for cladistic and phenetic classifications. Whereas nowadays cladograms are usually created by applying algorithmic methods to gene sequences, Sokal numerically compared the morphological characteristics of organisms, rather than their genetic information.

The Caminalcules can be used as a tool for evaluating taxonomic methods by virtue of their similarity to data sets of real organisms. Many of their properties, including evolutionary rates, species longevity, homoplasy, parallelism, and other measures for quantifying evolutionary change, are within the range of values that have been observed for real organisms. However, the taxonomic diversity distribution of the Caminalcules differs from the taxonomic diversity distributions of real animals and plants, since it does not follow a hollow curve.

== Use in education ==
Caminalcules are commonly used in secondary school and undergraduate university curriculums as a tool for teaching principles of phylogeny and evolution. They can, for example, be used to illustrate the concepts of parsimony and convergent evolution.

Students are typically asked to construct a phylogenetic tree based on the morphological characteristics of the Caminalcules and taking into account evolutionary principles. In an article in American Biology Teacher, Robert P. Gendron published instructions for a lesson plan in which students are first asked to construct a potential tree based solely on the living Caminalcules, followed by a definitive tree that includes the fossil species. Many secondary and tertiary educational institutions around the world have adopted lesson plans that follow this sequence. Some examples are the New York City Lab School for Collaborative Studies, the University of Miami, Carleton College, and the Turkana Basin Institute. Notably, the United States’ National Park Service also uses the Caminalcules in their lesson plans about evolution.

Using Caminalcules to practice the construction of phylogenetic trees has an advantage over using data sets consisting of real organisms, because it prevents the students’ pre-existing knowledge about the classification of real organisms to influence their reasoning during the exercise. They may only use the given data set and the principles of evolution to come to a solution, which is how real taxonomic problems are solved as well.

There are many other popular phylogenetic exercises that use different sets of ‘organisms’, some of which were inspired by the Caminalcule exercises. Potential alternative data sets include sets of twigs, chocolate bars, Chinese masks, and dragons. Students may also be asked to create their own sets of fictional organisms, which has the additional value of demonstrating macroevolutionary processes. Furthermore, in the case of data sets without a known phylogeny, unlike the case of the Caminalcules, students may find multiple, equally correct solutions. This may demonstrate the fact that taxonomic questions do not always have a single correct response, since the true phylogeny often remains unknown.
