= Phenetics =

Attempt to classify organisms based on overall similarity

In biology, phenetics (/fɪˈnɛtɪks/; from Ancient Greek φαίνειν (phainein) 'to appear'), also known as taximetrics, is an attempt to classify organisms based on overall similarity, usually with respect to morphology or other observable traits, regardless of their phylogeny or evolutionary relation. It is related closely to numerical taxonomy which is concerned with the use of numerical methods for taxonomic classification. Many people contributed to the development of phenetics, but the most influential were Peter Sneath and Robert R. Sokal. Their books are still primary references for this sub-discipline, although now out of print.

Phenetics has been largely superseded by cladistics for research into evolutionary relationships among species. However, certain phenetic methods, such as neighbor-joining, are used for phylogenetics, as a reasonable approximation of phylogeny when more advanced methods (such as Bayesian inference) are too expensive computationally.

Phenetic techniques include various forms of clustering and ordination. These are sophisticated methods of reducing the variation displayed by organisms to a manageable degree. In practice this means measuring dozens of variables, and then presenting them as two- or three-dimensional graphs. Much of the technical challenge of phenetics concerns balancing the loss of information due to such a reduction against the ease of interpreting the resulting graphs.

The method can be traced back to 1763 and Michel Adanson (in his Familles des plantes) because of two shared basic principles – overall similarity and equal weighting – and modern pheneticists are sometimes termed neo-Adansonians.

== Difference from cladistics ==
Phenetic analyses are "unrooted", that is, they do not distinguish between plesiomorphies, traits that are inherited from an ancestor, and apomorphies, traits that evolved anew in one or several lineages. A common problem with phenetic analysis is that basal evolutionary grades, which retain many plesiomorphies compared to more advanced lineages, seem to be monophyletic. Phenetic analyses are also liable to be rendered inaccurate by convergent evolution and adaptive radiation. Cladistic methods attempt to solve those problems.

Consider for example songbirds. These can be divided into two groups – Corvida, which retains ancient characteristics of phenotype and genotype, and Passerida, which has more modern traits. But only the latter are a group of closest relatives; the former are numerous independent and ancient lineages which are related about as distantly to each other as each single one of them is to the Passerida. For a phenetic analysis, the large degree of overall similarity found among the Corvida will make them seem to be monophyletic too, but their shared traits were present in the ancestors of all songbirds already. It is the loss of these ancestral traits rather than their presence that signifies which songbirds are more closely related to each other than to other songbirds. However, the requirement that taxa be monophyletic – rather than paraphyletic as for the case of the Corvida – is itself part of the cladistic method of taxonomy, not necessarily obeyed absolutely by other methods.

The two methods are not mutually exclusive. There is no reason why, e.g., species identified using phenetics cannot subsequently be subjected to cladistic analysis, to determine their evolutionary relationships. Phenetic methods can also be superior to cladistics when only the distinctness of related taxa is important, as the computational requirements are less.

The history of pheneticism and cladism as rival taxonomic systems is analysed in David Hull's 1988 book Science as a Process.

== Current usage ==
Traditionally there was much debate between pheneticists and cladists, as both methods were proposed initially to resolve evolutionary relationships. One of the most noteworthy applications of phenetics were the DNA–DNA hybridization studies by Charles G. Sibley, Jon E. Ahlquist and Burt L. Monroe Jr., from which resulted the 1990 Sibley-Ahlquist taxonomy for birds. Controversial at its time, some of its findings (e.g. the Galloanserae) have been vindicated, while others (e.g. the all-inclusive "Ciconiiformes" or the "Corvida") have been rejected. However, with computers growing increasingly powerful and widespread, more refined cladistic algorithms became available which could test the suggestions of Willi Hennig. The results of cladistic analyses were proven superior to those of phenetic methods, at least for resolving phylogenies.

Many systematists continue to use phenetic methods, particularly to address species-level questions. While a major goal of taxonomy remains describing the 'tree of life' – the evolutionary relationships of all species – for fieldwork one needs to be able to separate one taxon from another. Classifying diverse groups of closely related organisms that differ very subtly is difficult using a cladistic method. Phenetics provides numerical methods for examining patterns of variation, allowing researchers to identify discrete groups that can be classified as species.

Modern applications of phenetics are common for botany, and some examples can be found in most issues of the journal Systematic Botany. Indeed, due to the effects of horizontal gene transfer, polyploid complexes and other peculiarities of plant genomics, phenetic techniques of botany – though less informative altogether – may, for these special cases, be less prone to errors compared with cladistic analysis of DNA sequences.

In addition, many of the techniques developed by phenetic taxonomists have been adopted and extended by community ecologists, due to a similar need to deal with large amounts of data.

== See also ==
- Distance matrices in phylogeny
- Folk taxonomy
- Form classification
- Linnaean taxonomy
- Phenomics
- Taxonomy
- Dendrogram
- Operational taxonomic unit
