= Sir John William Dawson Medal =

The Sir John William Dawson Medal is an award of the Royal Society of Canada (RSC), established in 1985 and named after the society's first president: John William Dawson. The medal was endowed by McGill Graduates Society (founded by Sir William in 1857), the Henry Birks Foundation and RSC, with contributions from Fellows, and staff and friends from McGill University, to commemorate Dawson's term as Principal and to honour “the man who built McGill”.

The medal is awarded for "important and sustained contributions by one individual in at least two different domains". The award consists of a silver medal and is awarded bi-annually.

== Recipients ==
Source: Royal Society of Canada

- 1987 - F. Kenneth Hare, CC, FRSC
- 1987 - Gérard Dion, OC, MSRC
- 1989 - Henry G. Thode, CC, FRS, MSRC
- 1991 - Ursula Franklin, CC, FRSC
- 1993 - J. Fraser Mustard, CC, FRSC
- 1995 - Pierre Dansereau, CC, MSRC
- 1997 - David M. Regan, FRSC
- 1999 - Guy Rocher, CC, MRSC
- 2001 - Maurice Ptito, MSRC
- 2003 - Martin L. Friedland, FRSC
- 2005 - Jean-Charles Chebat, MSRC
- 2007 - Roderick Alexander Macdonald, FRSC
- 2009 - Kenneth Standing, FRSC
- 2011 - Keith W. Hipel, FRSC
- 2013 - Rhoda Howard-Hassmann, FRSC
- 2015 - John K. Tsotsos, FRSC
- 2017 - Daniel Pauly
- 2019 - Digvir S. Jayas, FRSC
- 2021 - Catherine Potvin, FRSC
- 2023 - John Smol, FRSC
- 2025 - Henrik Poinar

== See also ==
- List of general science and technology awards
