= F. James Rohlf =

American biostatistician (born 1936)

- Born: 1936 (age 89–90); Blythe, California, USA
- Known for: Biometry, Numerical Taxonomy, Geometric Morphometrics
- Scientific career
- Fields: Biostatistics
- Workplaces: Stony Brook University
- Thesis: A numerical taxonomic study of the genus Aedes (Diptera: Culicidae) with emphasis on the congruence of larval and adult classifications. (1962)
- Doctoral advisor: Robert Sokal
- Website: www.stonybrook.edu/commcms/anthropology/faculty-and-staff/rohlf-fj.php

F. James Rohlf (born 1936) is an American biostatistician, known for his contributions to numerical taxonomy, biometry, and geometric morphometrics. He is Distinguished Professor Emeritus in the Department of Ecology and Evolution and a Research Professor in the Department of Anthropology at Stony Brook University and Fellow of the American Association for the Advancement of Science.

== Early life and education ==
Rohlf received a Ph.D. in entomology from the University of Kansas in 1962, studying under Robert Sokal.

== Career ==
Rohlf and Sokal were prominent early collaborators in the development of numerical taxonomy from the 1960s onward. He later joined the Department of Ecology and Evolution at Stony Brook University, where he held the John S. Toll Professorship. He retired in early 2014 and now holds the titles of Distinguished Professor Emeritus Ecology and Evolution and Research Professor Department of Anthropology.

With Robert Sokal, Rohlf co-authored Biometry: The Principles and Practice of Statistics in Biological Research, a widely used statistics textbook reviewed favorably in the academic press upon publication. His later research concentrated on geometric morphometrics, the statistical analysis of shape variation in biological structures, with applications to many types of organisms and biological structures.

== Honors ==
- Established the "Rohlf Medal" for Excellence in Morphometric Methods and Applications in 2006.
- Fellow, American Association for the Advancement of Science.
- Fellow, American Academy of Arts and Sciences.

== Publications ==
- Rohlf, F. James (March 2026). "Too many numbers?". Systematic Biology. 75 (1): 14–21. doi:10.1093/sysbio/syaf076.
- Rohlf, F. James (March 2021). "Why Clusters and Other Patterns Can Seem to be Found in Analyses of High-Dimensional Data". Evolutionary Biology. 48 (1): 1–16. doi:10.1007/s11692-020-09518-6.
- Cardini, Andrea, O'Higgins, Paul, Rohlf, F. James (2019). "Seeing distinct groups where there are none: spurious patterns from between-group PCA" (PDF). Evolutionary Biology. 46 (4): 303–316. doi:10.1007/s11692-019-09487-5.
- Rohlf, F. J. 2017. The method of random skewers. Evolutionary Biology 44:542-550. http://dx.doi.org/10.1007/s11692-017-9425-8
- Siver, P. A.; Wolfe, A. P.; Rohlf, F. J.; Shin, W.; Jo, B. Y. (March 2013). "Combining geometric morphometrics, molecular phylogeny, and micropaleontology to assess evolutionary patterns in M allomonas (Synurophyceae: Heterokontophyta)". Geobiology. 11 (2): 127–138. doi:10.1111/gbi.12023. PMID 23331313.
