= Canadian Journal of Administrative Sciences =

Canadian Journal of Administrative Sciences/Revue Canadienne des Sciences de l'Administration
- Discipline: Business
- Language: English, French
- Edited by: Felix Arndt

Publication details
- History: 1983–present
- Publisher: Wiley-Blackwell on behalf of the Administrative Sciences Association of Canada (Canada)
- Frequency: Quarterly
- Impact factor: 2.2 (2022)

Standard abbreviations
- ISO 4: Can. J. Adm. Sci.

Indexing
- ISSN: 0825-0383 (print); 1936-4490 (web)
- OCLC no.: 288974914

Links
- Journal homepage; Online access; Online archive

Canadian Journal of Administrative Sciences (French: Revue Canadienne des Sciences de l'Administration) is a quarterly peer-reviewed academic journal published by Wiley-Blackwell on behalf of the Administrative Sciences Association of Canada. As of 2017, the editor-in-chief is Michel Laroche (Concordia University). The journal publishes articles in both English and French in all key disciplines of business. According to the Journal Citation Reports, its 2022 impact factor is 2.2, ranking it 129 out of 155 journals in the category "Business" and 193 out of 223 journals in the category "Management".

== Editors ==
The following persons have been or currently are editors of the journal:

Editor	Affiliation	Years
Felix Arndt	University of Guelph	2023-
Michel Laroche	Concordia University	2017–2023
Vishwanath V. Baba	McMaster University	2012–2016
Rick D. Hackett	McMaster University	2006–2012
Iraj Fooladi, Mary R. Brooks	Dalhousie University	2003–2005
Abolhassan Jalilv	Concordia University	1997–1999
Vishwanath V. Baba	Concordia University	1991–1996
Jean-Charles Chebat	HEC Montréal	1988–1990
Ronald J. Burke	York University	1983–1987
