= John Tsotsos =

Canadian Computer Scientist (born 1952)

John K. Tsotsos FRSC
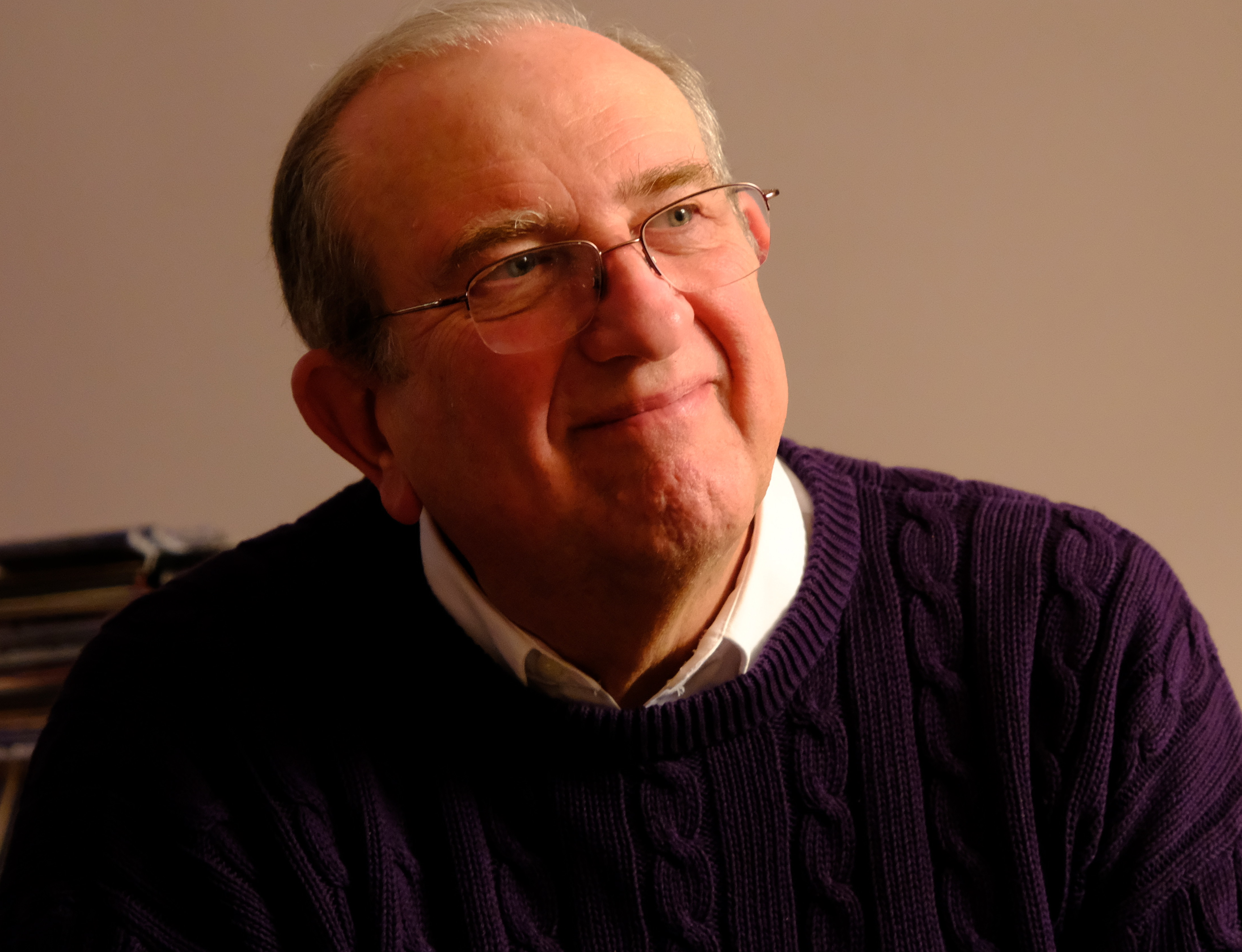
- John in 2018
- Born: September 3, 1952 (age 74); Windsor, Ontario, Canada
- Education: University of Toronto
- Known for: Computational complexity analysis of human and machine vision; Selective Tuning model of visual attention; AIM Saliency model; Active vision in robot systems
- Awards: Fellow, Royal Society of Canada, 2010.; Sir John William Dawson Medal, Royal Society of Canada, 2015.; Fellow, IEEE (Computer Society), 2018 (Life Fellow 2024).; CS-Can|Info-Can Lifetime Achievement Award in Computer Science, 2020.; Fellow, Canadian Academy of Engineering, 2024.
- Scientific career
- Fields: Computer Vision; Human Vision; Artificial Intelligence; Robotics
- Doctoral advisor: John Mylopoulos; H. Dominic Covvey; Steven W. Zucker
- Website: www.yorku.ca/professor/tsotsos/

John Tsotsos (born September 3, 1952) is a Canadian Computer Scientist whose research spans the fields of Computer Vision, Human Vision, Robotics, and Artificial Intelligence. He is best known for his work in visual attention, specifically for establishing the need for visual attention in both biological and computational systems through an argument based on the computational complexity of visual information processing and subsequently developing a computational framework for visual attention known as the Selective Tuning model. He is also acknowledged as a pioneer in the area of Active Vision, his students and he being first to propose strategies for active object recognition and object visual search by a robot. He has made many contributions to machine vision (particularly motion interpretation, colour processing, binocular vision, active robotic head design, shape analysis as well as to human vision, robotics and applied areas such as cardiology or dentistry and assistive robotics.

== Education ==
Tsotsos received his Honours BASc in Engineering Science (1974), MSc in Computer Science (1976) and Ph.D. in Computer Science (1980), all from the University of Toronto with John Mylopoulos as the primary supervisor throughout. For his doctorate research, he developed the first computer system to interpret visual motion depicted in digital image sequences, with application to heart motion analysis. That work led to a postdoctoral fellowship in Cardiology, funded by the Ontario Heart Foundation at Toronto General Hospital, and supervised by the unit's Chief, E. Douglas Wigle.

== Academic career ==
Tsotsos first taught computer science at Atkinson College, York University, in 1978-79. On completing his Ph.D., he joined the University of Toronto on faculty in both Departments of Computer Science and of Medicine. In 1980 he founded the highly respected Computer Vision Group at the University of Toronto, which he led for 20 years. He received a Canadian Heart Foundation Scholarship for the years 1981-84. During the years at the University of Toronto, he was named a Fellow of the Canadian Institute for Advanced Research (CIFAR) (1985–90) and awarded a CP-Unitel Fellowship (1990–95) in CIFAR's Artificial Intelligence, Robotics and Society Program.

He was recruited to move to York University in 2000 as Director of the Centre for Vision Research. Under his directorship, the centre was ranked in the top six interdisciplinary vision research organizations in the world. At York, he was awarded the NSERC Tier I Canada Research Chair in Computational Vision which he has held for three consecutive terms (2003-2024). In 2014, he founded York's Centre for Innovation in Computing at Lassonde (IC@L) which he led during 2014–present. Other appointments include: Adjunct Professorships in Computer Science and in Ophthalmology and Vision Sciences at the University of Toronto (2000–present); Visiting Professor University of Hamburg, Germany, 1981; Visiting Professor, Polytechnical University of Crete, Greece 1992; Adjunct Professor, Dept. of Computer Science, University of Western Ontario, 2001 - 2002; Faculty Fellow, Centre for Advanced Studies, IBM Canada, Toronto Labs, 2002 - 2003; Visiting Professor, INRIA Sophia-Antipolis, NeuroMathComp Laboratory, France, 2007; Adjunct Scientist, Toronto, Rehab Institute, University of Toronto, 2011 - 2013; Visiting Professor, Brain and Cognitive Sciences, MIT, 2014.

Tsotsos has served on several journal editorial boards (Computer Vision and Image Understanding, Image and Vision Computing, AI and Medicine, Cognitive Processing, Vision Research) and almost 100 conference organizing and program committees. Notably, he was General Chair of the 7th IEEE International Conference on Computer Vision.

He co-edited a 2005 comprehensive reference book titled Neurobiology of Attention with Laurent Itti and Geraint Rees. His first research monograph was published in 2011 by MIT Press, A Computational Perspective on Visual Attention. He has also been a co-editor of several other collections of research papers.

On May 12, 2018, Konstantinos Derpanis, Gregory Dudek and Michael Jenkin organized a day-long Verbal Festschrift to celebrate his 65th birthday. The proceedings were recorded and the talks and photographs are publicly available.

== Honours, Awards and Distinctions ==
He has received many additional awards and honours including several paper awards, among them a 1987 inaugural Marr Prize citation, the 1997 CITO Innovation Award for Leadership in Product Development from the Ontario Centres of Excellence (shared with W.J. MacLean), the 2006 Canadian Image Processing and Pattern Recognition Society Award for Research Excellence and Service, and the 1st President’s Research Excellence Award by York University on the occasion of the University’s 50th anniversary in 2009. In 2008, he was the first computer scientist to be named Distinguished Research Professor by York University. Tsotsos was awarded the 2011 Geoffrey J. Burton Memorial Lectureship jointly by the United Kingdom's Applied Vision Association and the British Machine Vision Association for significant contribution to vision science. He has been an ACM Distinguished Speaker, is an IEEE Fellow and an Asia-Pacific Artificial Intelligence Association (AAIA) Fellow. He was elected as Fellow of the Royal Society of Canada in 2010, in the Division of Mathematical and Physical Sciences of the Academy of Science, and was awarded its 2015 Sir John William Dawson Medal for sustained excellence in multidisciplinary research, the first computer scientist to be so honoured. In 2020, Canada's national computer science association, CS-Can|Info-Can, awarded him its Award for Lifetime Achievement in Computer Science. In 2024, he was elected as Fellow of the Canadian Academy of Engineering.

== Personal ==
John Konstantine Tsotsos was born in Windsor, Ontario, to Kostas Tsotsos (of Alona Florina, Greece) and Aliki Kokotos (born on Zakynthos and raised in Corfu and Thessaloniki, Greece), both school teachers who moved to Canada in 1951. Kostas was also a published poet and documented his experiences in World War II in an autobiography.

Interesting ancestry elements include the following. John is a 4th-degree grandson of the composer Nikolaos Chalikiopoulos Mantzaros and his wife Countess Marianna Giustiniani of the noble family of Komnenos Ioustinianos of Genoa. Mantzaros, born in Corfu, founded the Ionian School of music and is notably the composer of the National Anthem of Greece.

Iakovos, the father of Nikolaos, held a Doctorate of Law from the University of Padua and served as President of the Primary Council and Advocate General of the Ionian Islands. On Mar. 14, 1821, he was invested in the Knights Commanders of the Order of St. Michael and St. George. Iakovos' uncle Georgios Chalikiopoulos Mantzaros, (and Tsotsos' 7th-degree uncle), was the 304th (and last) Protopappas of the Greek Orthodox Church on Corfu (1975-1799) and the first Archbishop of Corfu. Alexandros S. Kokotos was Tsotsos' 3rd-degree uncle, and he was one of the godparents of Prince Philip, Duke of Edinburgh.

== Publications ==
=== Selected books ===
- Kotseruba, I., Tsotsos, J.K., The Computational Evolution of Cognitive Architectures, Oxford University Press, in press
- Tsotsos, J.K., A Computational Perspective on Visual Attention, MIT Press, (2011), ISBN 978-0-26-201541-7
- Itti, L., Rees, G., Tsotsos J.K., (editors), Neurobiology of Attention, Academic Press, (2005), ISBN 978-0-12-375731-9
- Tsotsos, J.K., Blake, A., Ohta, Y., Zucker, S., (editors), International Conference on Computer Vision, IEEE Computer Society, (1999), ISBN 0-7695-0164-8
- Jain, R., Huang, T., Tsotsos, J.K., (editors), Motion: Representation and Analysis, IEEE Computer Society Press, (1986), ISBN 0-8186-0696-7
- Badler, N.I., Tsotsos, J.K., (editors), Motion: Representation and Perception, Elsevier / North Holland, (1986), ISBN 0-444-01079-3
- Badler, N.I., Tsotsos, J.K., (editors), Motion: Representation and Perception: SIGGRAPH/SIGART Interdisciplinary Workshop, The Association for Computing Machinery, (1983), ISBN 0-89791-100-8

=== Selected Papers ===
- Modeling visual attention via selective tuning. Tsotsos, J. K., Culhane, S. M., Wai, W. Y. K., Lai, Y., Davis, N., & Nuflo, F. (1995). Artificial intelligence, 78(1-2), 507-545.
- Saliency based on information maximization. Bruce, N., & Tsotsos, J. (2006). In Advances in neural information processing systems (pp. 155–162).
- Analyzing vision at the complexity level. Tsotsos, J. K. (1990). Behavioral and brain sciences, 13(3), 423-445.
- Direct neurophysiological evidence for spatial suppression surrounding the focus of attention in vision. Hopf, J. M., Boehler, C. N., Luck, S. J., Tsotsos, J. K., Heinze, H. J., & Schoenfeld, M. A. (2006). Proceedings of the National Academy of Sciences, 103(4), 1053-1058.
- On the relative complexity of active vs. passive visual search. Tsotsos, J. K. (1992). International journal of computer vision, 7(2), 127-141.
- The complexity of perceptual search tasks. Tsotsos, J. K. (1989, August). In IJCAI (Vol. 89, pp. 1571–1577).
- A ‘complexity level’ analysis of immediate vision. Tsotsos, J. K. (1988). International Journal of Computer Vision, 1(4), 303-320.
- Efficient and generalizable statistical models of shape and appearance for analysis of cardiac MRI. Andreopoulos, A., & Tsotsos, J. K. (2008). Medical Image Analysis, 12(3), 335-357.
