= Guy Rocher =

Canadian academic and sociologist (1924–2025)

Guy Rocher CC GOQ MSRC
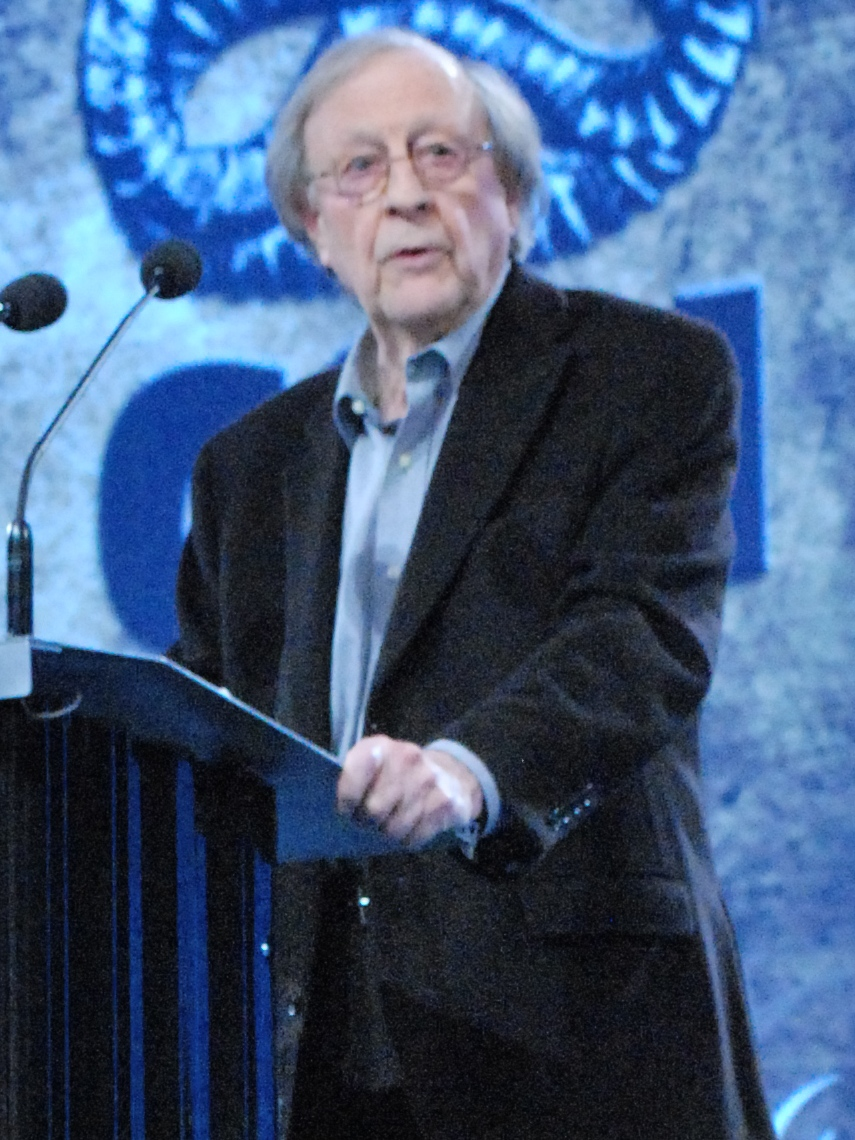
- Born: April 20, 1924; Berthierville, Quebec, Canada
- Died: September 3, 2025 (aged 101)
- Education: Université de Montréal; Université Laval; Harvard University
- Occupations: Academic; sociologist
- Awards: Order of Canada; National Order of Quebec
- Scientific career
- Fields: Sociology
- Thesis: The relations between church and state in New France during the seventeenth century: a sociological interpretation (1958)

Guy Arthur Auguste Rocher CC GOQ MSRC (April 20, 1924 – September 3, 2025) was a Canadian academic and sociologist.

== Background ==
Born in Berthierville, Quebec, he received a B.A. from the Université de Montréal in 1943, an M.A. in sociology from Université Laval in 1950, and a Ph.D. in sociology from Harvard University under Talcott Parsons in 1958. From 1952 until 1960 he taught at Université Laval. From 1960 he has taught at the Université de Montréal. Rocher turned 100 in April 2024.

Rocher died on September 3, 2025, at the age of 101.

== Professional career ==
While a professor at Laval, Rocher in 1957 became one of the founders of the Association internationale des sociologues de langue française, of which organization he was treasurer and a member of its first executive. In 1960, he became a full professor of sociology at Université de Montréal. There he was director of the sociology department (1960–1965), vice-dean of the social sciences faculty (1962–1967) and, from 1979 onwards, he has been a researcher in the Centre de recherche en droit public (Public Law Research Center). Rocher also worked for the government of Quebec, as deputy minister for cultural development (1977–1979) and as deputy minister for social development (1981–1983).

Rocher was a key contributor to Bill 101 in 1977.

== Work ==
Rocher was one of the pioneers in the application of contemporary social sciences to Quebec society, especially including the relationship between Church and State, intergenerational mobility and education, and the sociology of law. He was the author of several books and of numerous articles and scientific reports. He lectured extensively throughout Canada and abroad.

== Honours ==
- In 1971, he was appointed a Companion of the Order of Canada (CC).
- In 1991, he was made a Knight of the National Order of Quebec (CQ); this was upgraded to Officer (OQ) in 2018 and to Grand Officer (GOQ) in 2020.
- In 1991, he received the Royal Society of Canada's Pierre Chauveau Medal
- He received the 1997 Molson Prize in the Social Sciences and Humanities.
- In 1999, he received the Royal Society of Canada's Sir John William Dawson Medal.
