= Marie-Josée Fortin =

Canadian biologist

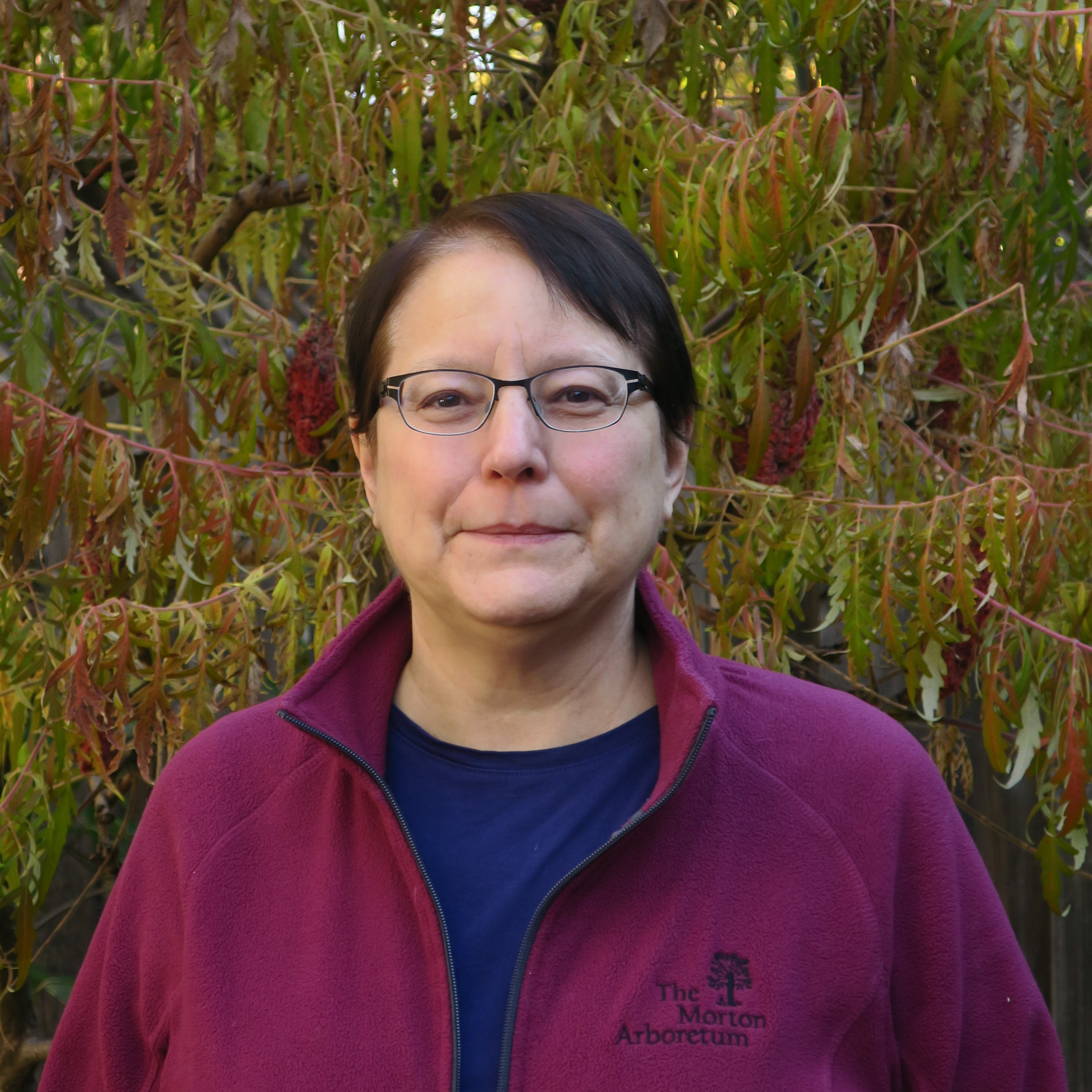
- Born: October 21, 1958 (age 68)
- Citizenship: Canadian
- Education: Stony Brook University; Université de Montréal
- Scientific career
- Fields: Spatial ecology
- Workplaces: Université de Sherbrooke; Université de Montréal; Simon Fraser University; University of Toronto
- Thesis: Detection of ecotones: definition and scaling factors (1992)
- Doctoral advisor: Robert Sokal
- Other academic advisors: Pierre Legendre; Serge Payette
- Website: fortin.eeb.utoronto.ca

Marie-Josée Fortin FRSC (born October 21, 1958) is an ecologist and Professor in the Department of Ecology and Evolutionary Biology at the University of Toronto. Fortin holds the Tier 1 Canada Research Chair in Spatial Ecology at the University of Toronto. In 2016, she was elected a Fellow of the Royal Society of Canada.

== Education and career ==
Fortin completed her BSc in biological sciences (1983) and her MSc in numerical ecology (1986) at the Université de Montréal, where she conducted research under Pierre Legendre. In 1992 she received a PhD in ecology and evolution from the Stony Brook University, where she was Robert Sokal's last doctoral student. She then went on to do a Postdoctoral Fellowship (1992-1994) at Université Laval, where she worked under Serge Payette.

Fortin joined Université de Sherbrooke in 1994 as an assistant professor in biology, and moved on to Université de Montréal in 1997 for a professorship in geography. She briefly worked at Simon Fraser University between 2000 and 2001, before joining University of Toronto as an associated professor. She became full professor at University of Toronto in 2006 and university professor in 2020.

== Research ==
Fortin focuses her current research on four subject areas: spatial ecology, spatial and landscape statistics, conservation, as well as disturbance ecology. These subjects include disciplines such as spatially-explicit modeling, spatial epidemiology, forest ecology, network theory, landscape genetics and geography. This research focuses on the maintenance of biodiversity within ecosystems and appropriate conservation strategies for species affected by land use and climate change. This includes the analyses of how environmental factors and ecological processes affect the movement, persistence, and range dynamics of species at the landscape and geographical range in both forested and aquatic environments.

== Publications ==
Since 1987, Fortin has contributed to a large number of publications in books as well as scientific journals involving ecology and conservation. This includes over 160 peer-reviewed papers and the co-authoring of the book Spatial Analysis: A Guide for Ecologists, which included the 1st and 2nd editions published in 2005 and 2014.

- Dale, Mark R. T.; Fortin, Marie-Josée (2025). Spatial Analysis: A Guide For Ecologists (3 ed.). Cambridge: Cambridge University Press. doi:10.1017/9781009158688. ISBN 9781009158671.
- Fletcher, Robert; Fortin, Marie-Josée (2018). Spatial ecology and conservation modeling : applications with R. Cham, Switzerland. ISBN 978-3-030-01989-1. OCLC 1087498061.
- Dale, Mark R. T.; Fortin, Marie-Josée (2021). Quantitative Analysis of Ecological Networks. Cambridge: Cambridge University Press. doi:10.1017/9781108649018. ISBN 978-1-108-49184-6. S2CID 233535624.

== Select awards and honours ==
- 2026: Killam Prize in Natural Sciences
- 2025: Miroslaw Romanowski Medal from the Royal Society of Canada
- 2023: Fellow of the Ecological Society of America
- 2016: Fellow of the Royal Society of Canada
- 2015: Outstanding Scientific Achievements Award from the International Association for Landscape Ecology.
- 2014: ISI Highly Cited Researcher in Ecology/Environment, Thomson Reuters
- 2013: Distinguished Landscape Ecologist Award (US Regional Association of the International Association for Landscape Ecology).
- 2002–2007: Premier's Research Excellence Award, Ontario (PREA).
- 2002–2007, 2009, 2010, 2012–2014, 2016, 2017: Dean's Excellence Award, Faculty Arts and Science, University of Toronto.
- 2001: Women in Geomatics Mentor Award. GEOIDE 3rd Annual Meeting, Fredericton.
