= Miroslaw Romanowski Medal =

- Description: Scientific resolution of environmental problems
- Country: Canada
- Presented by: Royal Society of Canada (RSC)
- Reward: $3,000 + Bronze Medal + Lecture Series
- Website: https://rsc-src.ca/en/awards-excellence/past-award-winners#RomanowskiMedal

The Miroslaw Romanowski Medal is awarded annually by the Royal Society of Canada "for significant contributions to the resolution of scientific aspects of environmental problems or for important improvements to the quality of an ecosystem in all aspects - terrestrial, atmospheric and aqueous - brought about by scientific means".

Established in 1994, the medal is named in honour of the metrologist Mirosław Romanowski.

== Recipients ==
Source: Royal Society of Canada

- 2025 - Marie-Josée Fortin
- 2024 - Catherine Mulligan
- 2023 - Abdelhamid Sayari
- 2022 - Rashid Sumaila
- 2021 - Amar K. Mohanty
- 2020 - Ajay Dalai
- 2019 - John Pomeroy
- 2018 - Lenore Fahrig, FRSC
- 2017 - Keith Hipel, FRSC
- 2016 - Mark Boyce, FRSC
- 2015 - R. Kerry Rowe, FRSC
- 2014 - Yves Bergeron, FRSC
- 2013 - John Giesy, FRSC
- 2012 - Catherine Potvin
- 2011 - Andrew J. Weaver, FRSC
- 2010 - Donald Mackay
- 2009 - Stan Boutin, FRSC
- 2008 - Warwick F. Vincent, FRSC
- 2007 - Christopher M. Wood
- 2006 - Richard Peltier
- 2005 - Robie Macdonald, FRSC
- 2004 - Derek C.G. Muir, FRSC
- 2003 - Peter J. Dillon
- 2002 - Kevin J. Kennedy
- 2001 - John P. Smol, FRSC
- 2000 - David R.S. Lean
- 1999 - Howard Roy Krouse, FRSC & Jerome O. Nriagu, FRSC
- 1998 - Thomas C. Hutchinson, FRSC
- 1997 - Michel Maldague
- 1996 - John A. Cherry, FRSC & Robert W. Gillham
- 1995 - Pierre Legendre, MSRC
- 1994 - David W. Schindler, FRSC

== See also ==
- List of environmental awards
- List of prizes named after people
