= John Smol =

Canadian ecologist and paleolimnologist

John P. Smol OC OOnt FRS FRSC
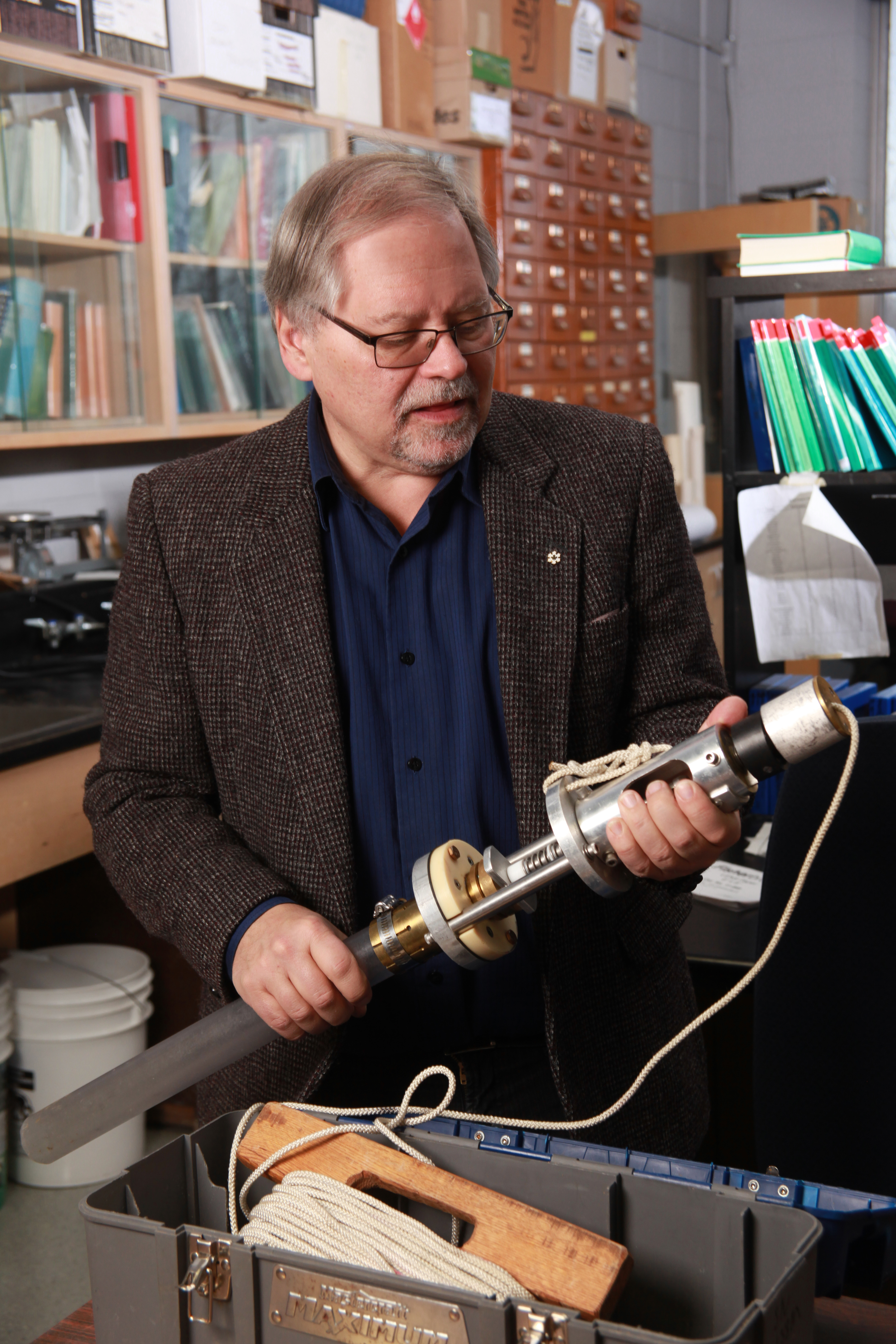
- John Smol holding a Glew lake sediment corer in his lab at Queen`s University
- Born: John P. Smol; Montreal, Quebec, Canada
- Education: McGill University (BSc); Brock University (MSc); Queen's University (PhD)
- Known for: Advancements in the field of long-term environmental change
- Awards: Steacie Prize (1992); Gerhard Herzberg Canada Gold Medal for Science and Engineering (2004); Flavelle Medal (2008); Vega Medal (2023); The Mohn Prize (2026)
- Scientific career
- Fields: Limnology; Paleolimnology; Limnogeology; Arctic; Diatoms
- Workplaces: Queen's University
- Thesis: Postglacial changes in fossil algal assemblages from three Canadian lakes (1982)
- Website: queensu.ca/pearl/

John Paul Smol is a Canadian ecologist, limnologist and paleolimnologist who is a Distinguished University Professor in the Department of Biology at Queen's University, Kingston, Ontario, where he also held the Canada Research Chair in Environmental Change for the maximum of three 7-year terms (2001–2021). He founded and co-directs the Paleoecological Environmental Assessment and Research Lab (PEARL).

== Early life ==
John Smol was born in Montreal, Canada. Both his parents were originally from Czechoslovakia. His mother was a war refugee and his father a political defector, who met in the immigrant sections of Montreal. His father was killed by a drunk driver in a car accident when Smol was 8 years old. He has three siblings, all of whom are in academia/education.

== Education ==
Smol was educated at McGill University (BSc), Brock University (MSc), and Queen's University (PhD).

== Career and research ==
Smol works on a diverse range of subjects, most of which focus on using lake sediments to reconstruct past environmental trends. Topics include: lake acidification caused by acid rain, sewage input and fertilizer runoff (eutrophication), studies of nutrient and contaminant transport by birds and other biovectors, and a large program on climatic change. For about three decades, he has been leading research in the high Arctic, studying the present-day ecology of polar lakes and ponds, and then using paleolimnological approaches to determine how these ecosystems have been changing due to natural and anthropogenic stressors.

The author or editor of 25 books and over 770 journal publications and book chapters, Smol is an international lecturer and media commentator on a variety of topics, but most dealing with environmental issues. From 1987 to 2007, he edited the Journal of Paleolimnology. Since 2004, he has been editor of the journal Environmental Reviews. He is the series editor of the Developments in Paleoenvironmental Research book series. He held the Chair of the International Paleolimnology Association for two three-year terms ending in August 2018, and served as President (2019–2022) of the Academy of Science, Royal Society of Canada.

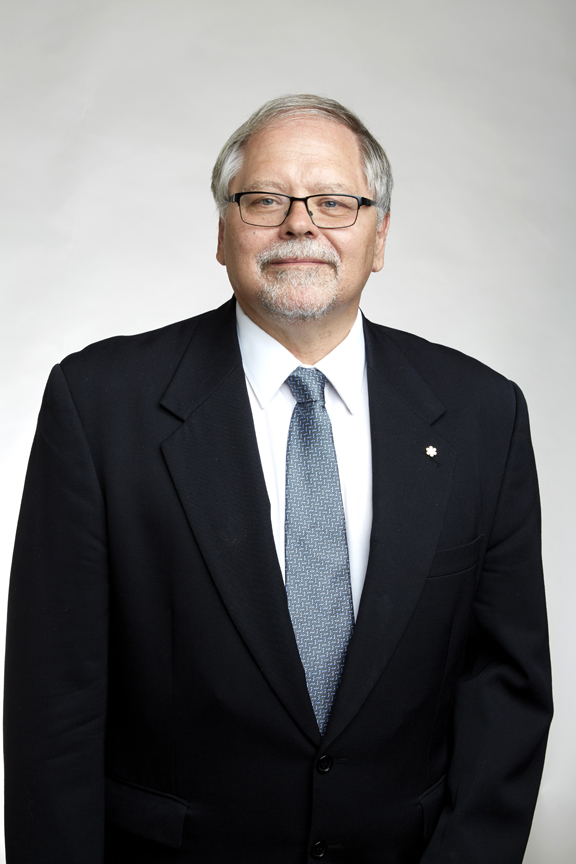
John P. Smol at the Royal Society admissions day in London, July 2018

=== Honours and awards ===
Among over 100 awards and fellowships, Smol is the recipient of the Gerhard Herzberg Canada Gold Medal for Science and Engineering, given by the Natural Sciences and Engineering Research Council of Canada (NSERC) to honour Canada's top scientist or engineer. He also holds the distinction of being awarded four individual medals from the Royal Society of Canada, namely: the Miroslaw Romanowski Medal for significant contributions to the resolution of environmental problems; the Flavelle Medal for outstanding contribution to biological science; the McNeil Medal for the Public Awareness of Science; and the Sir John William Dawson Medal for important and sustained contributions in two domains (in his case, geology and biology) of interdisciplinary research. Smol was elected a Fellow of the Royal Society of Canada in 1996, Fellow of the Royal Society (FRS) in 2018, and named an International member of the US National Academy of Sciences in 2025. He holds seven honorary degrees: LLD, St Francis Xavier University (2003); PhD, University of Helsinki (2007); DSc, University of Waterloo (2012); LLD, Mount Allison University (2016); DSc, Ryerson University (2016); DSc, Western University (University of Western Ontario) (2017); DSc, Acadia University (2024). The Vega Medal from the Swedish Society for Anthropology and Geography (SSAG) was presented to Smol by the King of Sweden in 2023, and the Norwegian Prime Minister presented him with The Mohn Prize, the world’s largest award for Arctic research, in 2026. In 2013 he was named an Officer of the Order of Canada. and was made a Member of the Order of Ontario for the class of 2022.

=== Selected publications ===
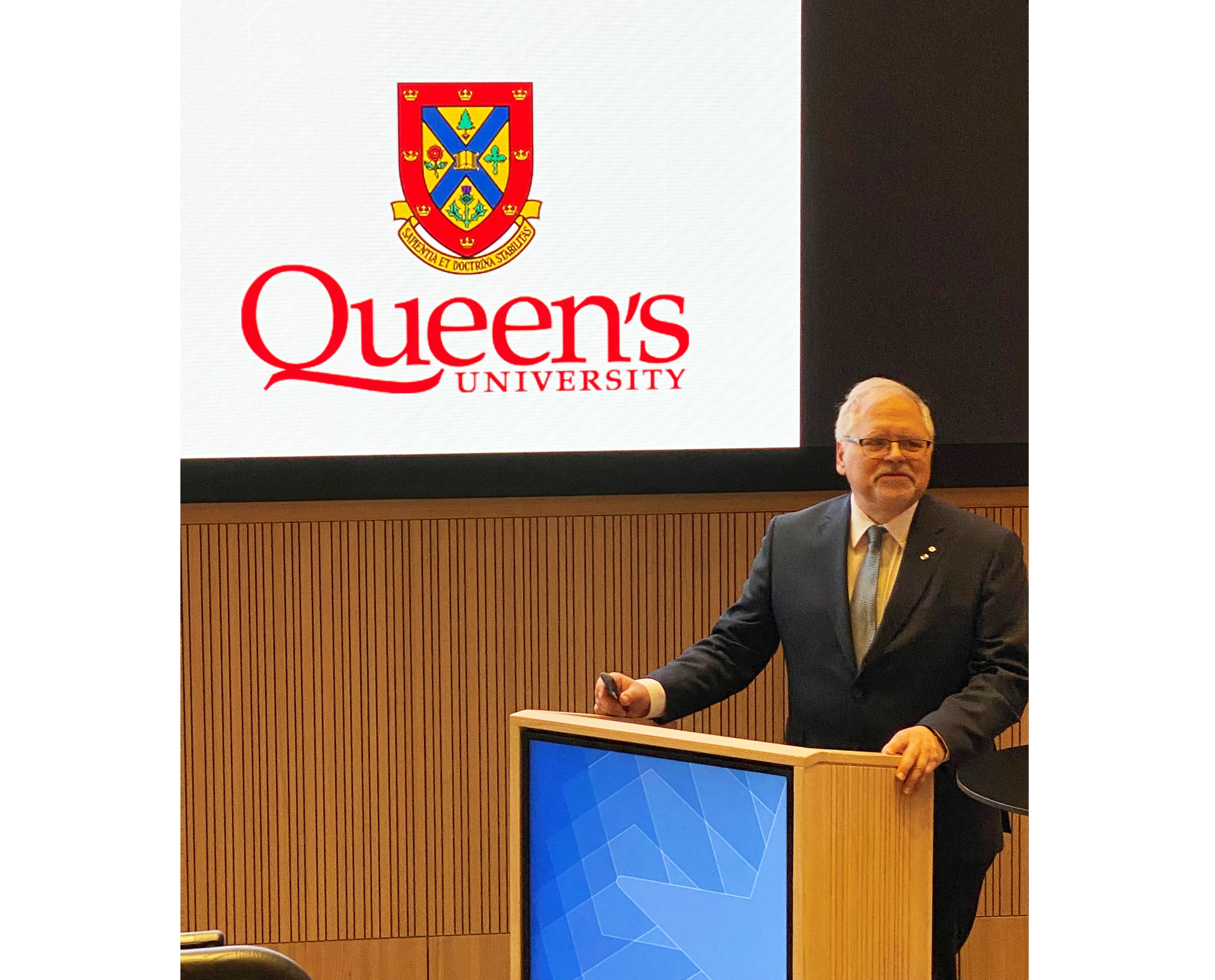
John Smol giving the 2023 Vega Medal Lecture in Stockholm, Sweden.

- Jones, I.D.; Smol, J.P. [Editors] 2024. Wetzel's Limnology: Lake and River Ecosystems. 4th Edition. 1088 pp. Oxford, UK: Elsevier. ISBN 978-0-12-822710-7.
- Smol, J. P. (2023). Lakes in the Anthropocene: Reflections on Tracking Ecosystem Change in the Arctic. Excellence in Ecology Book Series. Oldendorf/Luhe, Germany: International Ecology Institute (ECI). ISBN 978-3-946729-30-3. ISSN 0932-2205.
- Smol, J. P. (2008). Pollution of lakes and rivers: a paleoenvironmental perspective. Malden, MA: Blackwell Pub. ISBN 978-1-4051-5913-5. OCLC 123391088.
- Smol, J. P.; Stoermer, E. F. (2010). The diatoms: applications for the environmental and earth sciences. Cambridge, UK: Cambridge University Press. ISBN 978-0-521-50996-1.
- "Water and wisdom: an open letter to Ottawa". The Globe and Mail. 2012-06-05.
- Smol, John (2016). "Some advice to early career scientists: Personal perspectives on surviving in a complex world". Ideas in Ecology and Evolution. 9. Queen's University Library. doi:10.4033/iee.2016.9.5.e. ISSN 1918-3178.
- Smol, John P. (2018-10-01). "A crisis in science literacy and communication: Does reluctance to engage the public make academic scientists complicit?". FACETS. 3 (1). Canadian Science Publishing: 952–957. doi:10.1139/facets-2018-0022. ISSN 2371-1671. S2CID 158775829.
- Smol, John P. (2019-07-10). "Under the radar: long-term perspectives on ecological changes in lakes". Proceedings of the Royal Society B: Biological Sciences. 286 (1906) 20190834. The Royal Society. doi:10.1098/rspb.2019.0834. ISSN 0962-8452. PMC 6650715. PMID 31288704.
