= Pierre Legendre (ecologist) =

Canadian ecologist

Pierre Legendre CM FRSC OQ
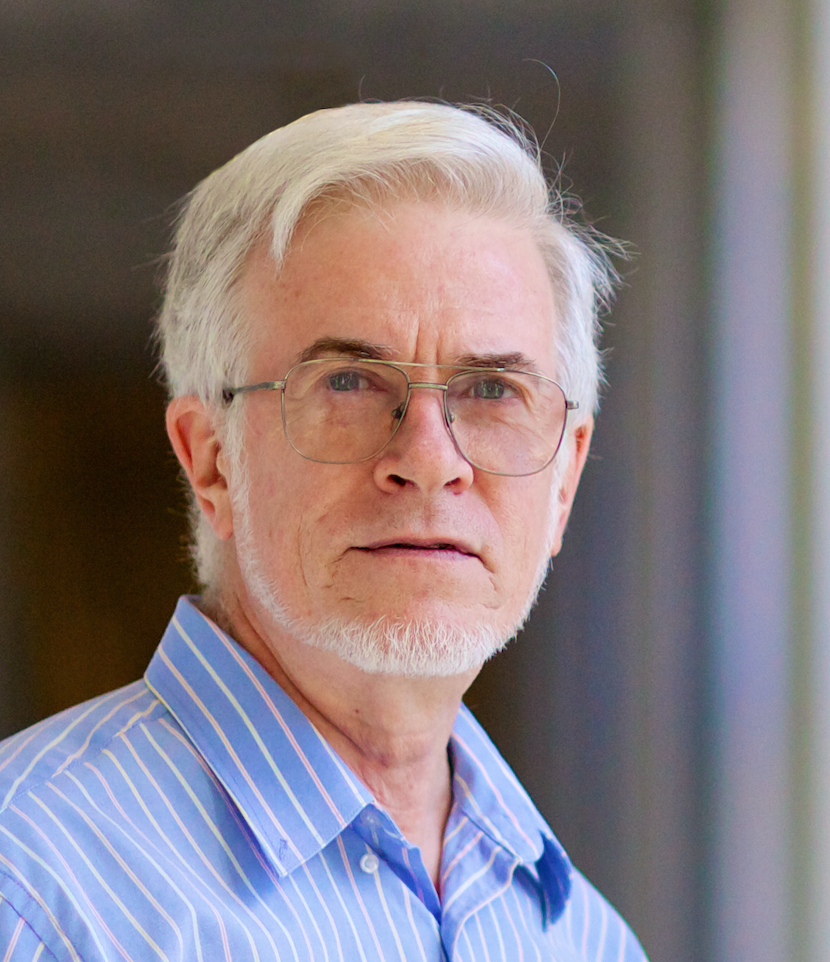
- Born: 5 October 1946 (age 79); Montreal, Quebec, Canada
- Education: McGill University; University of Colorado Boulder
- Scientific career
- Fields: Numerical ecology; Community ecology; Multivariate statistics; Beta diversity; Spatial analysis; Statistical methods
- Workplaces: Université du Québec à Montréal; Université de Montréal
- Thesis: Some formal aspects of the theory of biological evolution (1971)
- Doctoral advisor: Askell Löve
- Notable students: Marie-Josée Fortin
- Website: numericalecology.com/indexEn.html

Pierre Legendre CM FRSC OQ (born 5 October 1946), is an emeritus professor of ecology at Université de Montréal. He founded the field of numerical ecology, which is a quantitative subdiscipline of community ecology, with his brother the oceanographer Louis Legendre.

Pierre Legendre obtained an MSc in zoology from McGill University in 1969, and at age 24, he earned a PhD in evolutionary biology from the University of Colorado Boulder in 1971. From 1971 to 1972, he was a postdoctoral fellow at Lund University in Sweden. From 1972 to 1980, he was research associate, then research director in an environmental science research centre at Université du Québec à Montréal. Since 1980, he has been professor of quantitative ecology in the department of biological sciences at Université de Montréal. He retired from teaching in September 2024 and was appointed professor emeritus at Université de Montréal in 2025.

== Scientific prizes ==
- 1986 – Acfas Michel-Jurdant Prize (with Louis Legendre)
- 1995 – Miroslaw Romanowski Medal, Royal Society of Canada
- 2005 – Prix Marie-Victorin, Government of Québec
- 2013 – President's Award, Canadian Society for Ecology and Evolution
- 2015 – Acfas Adrien-Pouliot Award
- 2019 – Alexander von Humboldt Medal, International Association for Vegetation Science (IAVS)

== Other distinctions ==
- 1992 – Royal Society of Canada, Academy of Science
- 2007 – National Order of Québec
- 2021 – Order of Canada
