= Christopher Wood (biologist) =

Chris M. Wood
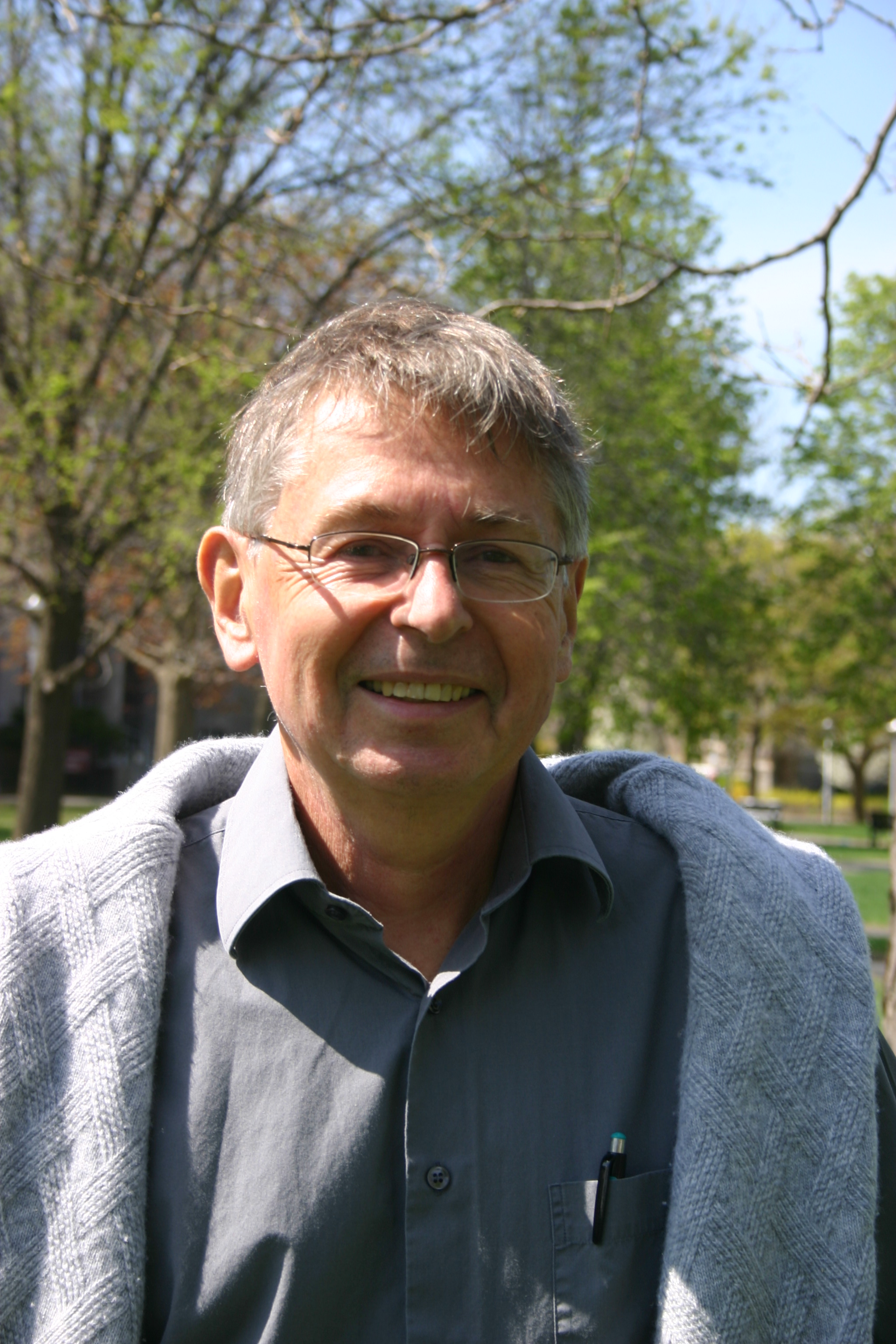
- Chris M. Wood in 2015
- Education: University of British Columbia; University of East Anglia
- Awards: FRSC (2003); Miroslaw Romanowski Medal (2007)
- Scientific career
- Fields: Fish physiology
- Workplaces: UBC; McMaster University; Univ of Miami
- Thesis: Studies on the pharmacology and physiology of vascular resistance in the rainbow trout (Salmo gairdneri) (1974)

Christopher M. Wood FRSC is an adjunct professor of zoology at the University of British Columbia and a Lifetime Distinguished University Professor, and emeritus Professor of Biology at McMaster University. He is also a research professor at the University of Miami. His research is primarily concerned with Fish physiology and aquatic toxicology.

He was educated at the University of British Columbia (BSc, 1968; MSc, 1971) and the University of East Anglia (PhD, 1974). He joined the faculty of McMaster University in 1976 where he was a Canada Research Chair in Environment and Health from 2001 to 2014. In 2014 he retired from McMaster University and moved to the University of British Columbia, where his research program is now based. He was made a Fellow of the Royal Society of Canada in 2003, and was awarded the 2007 Miroslaw Romanowski Medal. He was also awarded the Fry Medal of the Canadian Society of Zoologists in 1999.
