= John Giesy =

American ecotoxicologist

John P. Giesy
- Born: 1948 (age 77–78); Youngstown, Ohio, US
- Known for: Expertise in chemical contaminants in the environment
- Spouse: Susan Elaine (Damerell) Giesy
- Children: 1 daughter
- Awards: Miroslaw Romanowski Medal

Academic background
- Education: BS with honors, Magna cum laude, 1970, Alma College; MS, 1971, PhD, Fisheries & Wildlife (Limnology), 1974, Michigan State University
- Alma mater: Alma College
- Thesis: The effects of humic acids on the growth of and uptake of iron and phosphorus by the green alga Scenedesmus obliquus (Türp) Kütz (1974)

Academic work
- Discipline: Limnology, Environmental Science, Environmental Toxicology, Environmental Chemistry
- Sub-discipline: Risk assessment of Chemicals in the Environment
- Institutions: Baylor University; University of Saskatchewan; Western College of Veterinary Medicine; Michigan State University; University of Georgia; University of Hong Kong; Nanjing University; Hong Kong Baptist University; Xiamen University
- Website: https://www.giesy.net/

John Paul Giesy Jr. FRSC (born 1948 in Youngstown, Ohio) is an American–Canadian ecotoxicologist. He is an Emeritus Distinguished Professor and former Canada Research Chair in Environmental Toxicology at the University of Saskatchewan. Currently, Giesy is a Visiting Distinguished Professor of Environmental Science at Baylor University in Waco, Texas, USA. Giesy was credited with being the first scientist to discover toxic per- and poly-fluoroalkyl [PFAS] chemicals in the environment. His discoveries also include the photo-enhanced toxicity.

== Early life and education ==
Giesy was born in 1948 in Youngstown, Ohio, US. He grew up in Flint, Michigan, where he attended Flint Central High School. Giesy was a varsity wrestler and played in the marching and concert bands. In 1963, Giesy became an Eagle Boy Scout. He graduated from Alma College, where he was a varsity wrestler and played in the Kiltie Marching Band. In 1970, he enrolled at Michigan State University (MSU) for his master's degree and PhD in Fisheries and Wildlife with a specialization in Limnology. He served on the Board of Directors of Alma College and was President of the Alumni Board, and received Alma College's Distinguished Alumni Award.

== Career ==
=== MSU ===
Giesy started his career at the University of Georgia, where he was promoted to the rank of associate professor before returning to MSU in 1979. As a professor at MSU, Giesy became a member of the university's pesticide research center and served as president of the Society of Environmental Toxicology and Chemistry (SETAC) from which he received the Founder's Award, which is the highest global award given by SETAC and is now a SETAC Fellow. In 1987, Giesy was awarded a Fulbright Fellowship to lecture and conduct research at Bayreuth University in West Germany. Following this, he received the 1990 CIBA-GEIGY Agricultural Recognition Award for "lifelong contributions to the science of environmental toxicology and continuing excellence in research and teaching".

At the turn of the century, Giesy and Kurunthachalam Kannan were the first to report on "the global distribution of perfluorooctanesulfonate (PFOS), a fluorinated organic contaminant." Based on the findings of their 2000 study, Giesy and Kannan said that "PFOS were widely detected in wildlife throughout the world" and that "PFOS is widespread in the environment." They said that "PFOS can bioaccumulate to higher trophic levels of the food chain" and that the "concentrations of PFOS in wildlife are less than those required to cause adverse effects in laboratory animals." Giesy was also credited with being the first scientist to discover toxic per- and poly-fluoroalkyl [PFAS] chemicals in the environment. To date, Giesy has published 87 peer-reviewed papers on Per- and poly-fluorinated compounds.

As a result of his research, Giesy was named an Einstein Professor, the highest honor bestowed to non-Chinese by the Chinese Academy of Science, and was appointed the Distinguished Honorary Professor at King Saud University as the top environmental toxicologist in the world. During his tenure at MSU, his discoveries included the cause of deformities and lethality in birds of the Great Lakes, photo-enhanced toxicity, and the presence of perfluorinated chemicals in the environment, an important new class of contaminants widely used in common commercial products. Currently, Giesy is studying the fates, distribution and hazards posed by liquid crystal monomers (LCMs) used in the production of flat-screen devices. The LCMs, which are now ubiquitous in the environment, including in the brains of cetaceans, have structures and properties that make them persistent organic pollutants (POPs). They are also predicted to be toxic, but so far little information is available on their potential to cause toxicity.

=== University of Saskatchewan ===
Giesy eventually left MSU to become a Canada Research Chair in Environmental Toxicology at the University of Saskatchewan (U of S) and professor in the Western College of Veterinary Medicine's Department of Veterinary Biomedical Sciences. In 2010, Giesy was elected as a Member National Academy of Sciences of Canada in the Earth, Ocean and Atmospheric Sciences Division of Academy III and elected a Fellow of the Royal Society of Canada (RSC) for being "among the world's most influential environmental toxicologists whose work in ecological risk assessment, including aquatic, wildlife and avian toxicology, has had global impact." He was also among the three nominees for the 2010 Innovation Place-Industry Liaison Office Award of Innovation for having co-developed an assay test that evaluates the effects of chemicals on hormones.

While at U of S, Giesy continued to conduct research on endocrine-disrupting chemicals and was sought by the U.S. Environmental Protection Agency to develop a way to test for these chemicals. As a result, his research team devised a test for use in worldwide screening programs. In 2012, Giesy was recognized with the Lifetime Achievement Award from the Paris-based Scientific Committee on Problems of the Environment and China's Zhongyu Environmental Technologies Corporation. He was also awarded RSC's Miroslaw Romanowski Medal in recognition of his "critical work addressing environmental contamination".

As a result of the COVID-19 pandemic, and like many US municipalities, Giesy helped develop an early warning system for COVID-19 by sampling and testing the city's wastewater. By 2021, his laboratory started picking up shedding of the SARS-CoV-2 Alpha variant two weeks prior to an Alberta outbreak by studying the sewage. Giesy's wastewater studies were very similar to prior studies conducted in early 2020 by MIT, Harvard, and Brigham and Women's Hospital. Giesy's team received the Smart 50 Award for the monitoring during COVID.

In 2019, Giesy was awarded an honorary doctorate from Masaryk University in the Czech Republic in the field of environmental sciences.

=== Baylor University ===
In 2016, Giesy was appointed as a Visiting Distinguished Professor of Environmental Studies and to the Graduate Faculty at Baylor University. He continues to teach undergraduate and graduate classes, advise graduate students and conduct research and publish with Baylor Faculty.

=== Select publications ===
Giesy (ORCID 0000-0003-1931-9962) has published 1,459 open literature, journal articles, 6 feature articles, 3 special publications, 3 theses, 7 books written, 11 books edited, 4 textbook chapters, 5 published reviews, 27 published reports, and 20 special reports. Giesy has an H-index of 155 and is among the most cited authors in the field of environmental science. Giesy is on the list of the top 2% of global authors in all fields by the Stanford-Elsevier listing, where he is #3 in Ecotoxicology.

=== Controversy ===
In 2018, Giesy was accused of covertly suppressing academic research on the dangers of PFAS for the benefit of 3M. Attorneys representing the state of Minnesota claimed Giesy was part of 3M's alleged campaign to "distort" and "suppress" scientific research on the toxicity of per- and polyfluoroalkyl substances. Giesy subsequently denied all of the allegations and argued that they were "an attempt by the State of Minnesota and its Attorney General, Lori Swanson, to smear his reputation after he declined to serve as an expert for them in a lawsuit against 3M." However, emails show that Giesy filtered studies for the benefit of 3M. He pushed the studies that he could to 3M in an effort to delay or prevent publication, adding that he would bill differently to prevent a paper trail to 3M. Depositions obtained by FOX 9 show how 3M executives and scientists implemented a strategy to influence the science surrounding PFAS, shaped public perception, and attempted to keep some information secret.
