= Catherine Mulligan =

Environmental engineer

- Awards: Fellow of the Canadian Academy of Engineering; John B. Stirling Medal, Engineering Institute of Canada

Academic background
- Education: McGill University (BEng, MEng, PhD)

Academic work
- Discipline: Environmental engineering
- Sub-discipline: Decontamination of natural resources
- Institutions: University of Concordia; McGill University

Catherine Mulligan is a Canadian environmental engineer. She is a professor of Building, Civil, and Environmental Engineering and the Research Chair in Geo-environmental Sustainability at Concordia University. She is also the founding director of the Concordia Institute for Water, Energy and Sustainable Systems. Mulligan's work focused on the decontamination of water and sediments.

== Biography ==
Mulligan credits a conversation with her mother for triggering her interest in engineering. Mulligan completed a Bachelor of Engineering in Chemical Engineering and a Master of Engineering from McGill University. She then pursued a PhD in Geotechnical and Geoenvironmental Engineering also at McGill University.

Mulligan has been a professor at Concordia University since 1999. Her research focuses on developing and characterizing novel processes for sustainably purifying soil, sediment, and water that have been contaminated by metals, hydrocarbons, or other pollutants.

She served as director of the CREATE program at Concordia from 2012 until the program's end in 2018, leading the project's interdisciplinary investigations into solutions for environmental sustainability. Mulligan was the vice president of communications for the Canadian Geotechnical Society from 2013 to 2014.

In 2017, Mulligan was featured in a book by the Canadian Institute of Mining, Metallurgy and Petroleum titled Women of Innovation: The Impact of Leading Engineers in Canada.

In 2020, Mulligan became the third woman to be president of the Canadian Society for Civil Engineering.

As of January 2021, Mulligan has authored or contributed to over 175 publications.

In September 2022, The Royal Society of Canada recognised Mulligan's academic achievements and inducted her as Fellow of the Royal Society. This recognition came from her three decades of work in researching ways to decontaminate the environment.

== Awards and recognition ==
- 2024 Miroslaw Romanowski Medal
- 2020 Fellow, Canadian Academy of Engineering
- 2019 Provost's Circle of Distinction, Concordia University
- 2018 John B. Stirling Medal, Engineering Institute of Canada
- 2017 Fellow, Engineering Institute of Canada
- 2017 feature in Women of Innovation book, Canadian Institute of Mining, Metallurgy and Petroleum
- 2004 Young Innovator Award, Petro-Canada
- 2002 Young Innovator Award, Petro-Canada
