= Kerry Rowe =

Canadian civil engineer (born 1951)

Professor Kerry Rowe OC FRS FREng
- Born: Ronald Kerry Rowe; September 13, 1951 (age 73)
- Awards: Fellow of the Royal Society (2013); Officer of the Order of Canada (2018); Inaugural winner of the NSERC Donna Strickland Prize for Societal Impact of Natural Sciences and Engineering Research (2022)
- Scientific career
- Institutions: Queen's University
- Website: civil.queensu.ca/Research/Geotechnical/R-Kerry-Rowe1/index.html

Ronald Kerry Rowe (born 13 September 1951) is a Canadian civil engineer of Australian birth, one of the pioneers of geosynthetics.

== Education ==
Rowe was educated at Fort Street High School, Sydney (1964-1969) and the University of Sydney, where he was awarded a BSc (Computer Science) in 1973, BE (First Hons, Civil Engineering) and the University Medal in 1975, a PhD in 1979 and D.Eng in 1993.

== Career and research ==
Rowe worked as a geotechnical engineer with the Australian Government Department of Construction prior to emigrating to Canada in 1978, where he spent 22 years as a professor, including 8 years as Chair of the Department of Civil and Environmental Engineering at The University of Western Ontario, London, Canada.

From 2000 to 2010, he served as Vice-Principal (Research) at Queen's University in Kingston, Ontario where he was responsible for the administration of all research (in Business, Education, Humanities, Law, Social Sciences, Physical and Biological Sciences, Engineering and Applied Sciences, Health Sciences and Medicine). He is presently (2023) a Professor and the Canada Research Chair in Geotechnical and Geoenvironmental Engineering in the Department of Civil Engineering at Queen's.

His research has covered contaminant migration through soil and rock, landfill design, containment of contaminated sites, geosynthetics (including geotextiles, geomembranes, geogrids, geonets etc.), tailings storage facilities and dams, reinforced embankments and walls, tunnels in soft ground and the failure of slopes and excavations. In particular he has researched the effectiveness of plastic (geomembrane) liners and geosynthetic clay liners (a composite material incorporating clay) that limit contamination from mining operations and waste disposal facilities.

He is a past President of the International Geosynthetics Society, the Canadian Geotechnical Society and the Engineering Institute of Canada.

In 2012, the ISSMGE and Technical Committee 215 created the "R. Kerry Rowe Lecture" to honor Prof. Rowe's contributions to Environmental Geotechnics and his academic accomplishments. This distinguished lecture is delivered during the opening plenary session of the International Congress on Environmental Geotechnics (ICEG) and the International Conference on Soil Mechanics and Geotechnical Engineering (ICSMGE).

=== Publications ===
- Google Scholar - Kerry Rowe

=== Honours and awards ===
- 2001: Fellow of the Royal Society of Canada
- 2004: Killam Prize, awarded by the Canada Council
- 2005: Rankine Lecture to the British Geotechnical Association
- 2010: International Fellow, UK Royal Academy of Engineering
- 2012: Sir John Kennedy Medal of the Engineering Institute of Canada
- 2013: Fellow of the Royal Society of London, UK
- 2014: Thomas Telford Gold Medal of the Institution of Civil Engineers
- 2015: Miroslaw Romanowski Medal of the Royal Society of Canada
- 2016: Member of the National Academy of Engineering
- 2018: Officer of the Order of Canada
- 2018: International Geosynthetics Society Award and Gold Medal
- 2020: Elected Distinguished Member American Society of Civil Engineers
- 2022: Inaugural winner of the NSERC Donna Strickland Prize for Societal Impact of Natural Sciences and Engineering Research
