= Animalcule =

Antiquated term for microorganisms

Animalcule (Latin for 'little animal'; from animal and -culum) is an archaic term for microscopic organisms that included bacteria, protozoans, and very small animals. The word was invented by 17th-century Dutch scientist Antonie van Leeuwenhoek to refer to the microorganisms he observed in rainwater.

Some better-known types of animalcule include:

- Actinophrys, and other heliozoa, termed sun animalcules.
- Amoeba, termed Proteus animalcules.
- Noctiluca scintillans, commonly termed the sea sparkles.
- Paramecium, termed slipper animalcules.
- Rotifers, termed wheel animalcules.
- Stentor, termed trumpet animalcules.
- Vorticella, and other peritrichs, termed bell animalcules.

The concept seems to have been proposed at least as early as about 30 BC, as evidenced by this translation from Marcus Varro's Rerum Rusticarum Libri Tres:

Note also if there be any swampy ground, both for the reasons given above, and because certain minute animals, invisible to the eye, breed there, and, borne by the air, reach the inside of the body by way of the mouth and nose, and cause diseases which are difficult to be rid of.

The term was also used during the 17th century by Henry Oldenburg, the first Secretary of the Royal Society and founding editor of Philosophical Transactions, to translate the Dutch words used by van Leeuwenhoek to describe microorganisms that he discovered.

In Gilbert and Sullivan's The Pirates of Penzance, the word appears in adjectival form in the 'Major-General's Song', in which Major-General Stanley sings, 'I know the scientific names of beings animalculous...'

The term continued to be current at least as late as 1879.

A 1795 illustration of van Leeuwenhoek's animalcules by an unknown artist.

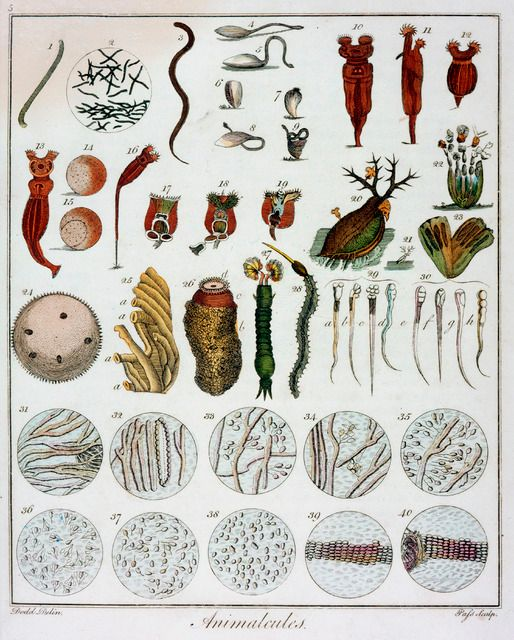
A 1795 illustration of van Leeuwenhoek's animalcules by an unknown artist

== See also ==
- Caminalcule
- Infusoria
- Van Leeuwenhoek's microscopic discovery of microbial life (microorganisms)
