= Maurice Ptito =

- Education: Université de Montréal
- Known for: Visual neuroplasticity; Tongue Display Unit
- Awards: Fellow of the Royal Society of Canada; Knight of the National Order of Quebec
- Scientific career
- Fields: Neuroscience, sensory substitution
- Workplaces: Université de Montréal; University of Copenhagen

Maurice Ptito is a Professor of Visual Neuroscience at the School of Optometry (Université de Montréal). He is also an adjunct professor of Neurology and Neurosurgery at the Montreal Neurological Institute (McGill University) and Guest scientist at the Department of Neuroscience (University of Copenhagen). He currently holds the Harland Sanders Research Chair in Vision Science.

== Education ==
Ptito studied at the Université de Montréal, where he earned a B.Sc. in Natural Sciences (1967), a B.A. in Psychology (1970), an M.Sc. in Physiological Psychology (1971), and a Ph.D. in Experimental Neuropsychology (1974) under the supervision of Bruno Cardu. He later pursued a doctorate in Health Sciences (Doctor Medicinae) in Brain Imaging at Aarhus University, Denmark (2001) with Albert Gjedde. From 1974 to 1976, he trained as a postdoctoral fellow in Neurophysiology and Psychiatry at Stanford University Medical School under Professor Karl H. Pribram.

== Career ==
Ptito has held academic and research appointments in Canada, the United States, Denmark, and Australia. He joined the Université de Montréal as Professor of Psychology in 1988, and later became Full Professor at the School of Optometry (1998–present). He has also been Adjunct Professor at the Montreal Neurological Institute since 1993.

Internationally, he was Adjunct Professor at the PET Center, Aarhus University Hospital (1999–2000), Visiting Professor at the University of Sydney (1996), and Guest Professor at the University of Copenhagen (2006–2007; 2014–2017). From 2012 to 2017, he served as Senior Scientist in Neuropsychiatry at the Psychiatric Centre Copenhagen, Rigshospitalet.

== Research ==
Ptito specializes in the development and plasticity of the visual system in humans and other species. His research investigates how the brain adapts to blindness, both congenital and acquired, using methodologies such as:

- Neuroimaging: diffusion tensor imaging (DTI), voxel-based morphometry, PET, fMRI
- Electrophysiology: visually evoked potentials
- Neuromodulation: transcranial magnetic stimulation (TMS)
- Behavioral methods: psychophysics, navigation studies

He has been a pioneer in sensory substitution research, notably through his collaboration with Ron Kupers (University of Copenhagen) on the Tongue Display Unit (TDU). This device, developed by the late Professor Paul-Bach-y-Rita, transforms visual inputs into electrotactile stimulation on the tongue, showing that visual cortical areas in blind individuals can be recruited to process tactile spatial information.

== Awards and honours ==
- Fellow of the Royal Society of Canada (1998)
- Sir John William Dawson Medal, Royal Society of Canada (2001)
- Discovery of the Year, Québec Science (2001)
- Fellow, American Academy of Optometry (2004)
- Henry and Karla Hansen Award (2007)
- Fellow, Royal Society of Denmark (2010)
- Chevalier de l’Ordre National du Québec (2013)

== Publications ==
Ptito has authored or co-authored over 220 peer-reviewed scientific papers, books, book chapters, and conference presentations. His work spans neuroplasticity, blindness, sensory substitution, brain imaging, and cannabinoid neuroscience.

== Personal ==
Maurice Ptito lives in Montreal (Qc, Canada) and in Copenhagen (Denmark). He has five daughters and seven grandchildren: Zoe, Zachary, Noa, Maïka, Manou, Maël and Lilly.
