= Jean-Charles Chebat =

Canadian academic, professor, and marketing researcher (1945–2019)

Jean-Charles Chebat CQ MSRC
- Born: Jean-Charles William Simon Chebath; January 13, 1945; Algiers, Algeria
- Died: May 21, 2019 (aged 74); Haifa, Israel
- Education: ESCP Business School; Université Laval (MBA); Université de Montréal (Ph.D.)
- Occupations: Academic; professor; marketing researcher
- Spouse: Claire Gélinas-Chebat
- Children: 3
- Scientific career
- Fields: Marketing; Social marketing; Consumer behavior; Atmospherics; Sociology; Public health
- Institutions: HEC Montréal
- Patrons: DeSerres; Hydro-Québec; Labatt Brewing Company
- Thesis: Family decision making processes and social classes: a systemic approach (1976)

Jean-Charles William Simon Chebath CQ MSRC (January 13, 1945 – May 21, 2019) was a Canadian academic, professor, and marketing researcher. He held the ECSC Research Chair of Retailing at HEC Montréal.

== Biography ==
=== Early life and education ===
Jean-Charles William Simon Chebath was born January 13, 1945, in Algiers, Algeria. He read at Ecole Supérieure de Commerce de Paris in marketing from 1965 to 1968, earned an MBA in marketing from Laval University in 1969 and a Ph.D. in sociology from the University of Montréal in 1976. His dissertation was titled "Family decision making processes and social classes: a systemic approach".

=== Career ===
Chebat was on the board of several top journals, such as Journal of Retailing, Journal of Business Research, and Journal of the Academy of Marketing Science. He was the Associate Editor of Perceptual and Motor Skills and Psychological Reports.

=== Marriage and children ===
Chebat was married to Claire Gélinas-Chebat, a professor of linguistics at the Université du Québec. The couple has three children: Daniel-Robert, Ph.D. in neuroscience, Associate Professor at Ariel University in Israel, Myriam, MA in social work and Elise, MS in marketing.

== Published works ==
- Marketing Management co-edited with Stanley Shapiro (Harper & Row, 1974)
- Strategie du Marketing: Concepts et Modeles with G. M. Henault, (PUQ, 1977)
- Gestion des Services with Pierre Filiatrault and Jean Harvey (McGraw-Hill, 1999)
- Comportement du Consommateur with Pierre Filiatrault, Michel Laroche, et al. (Gaetan-Morin, 2003)

He has published about 150 refereed journal articles (Journal of Retailing, Journal of Business Research, Environment & Behavior, Journal of Social Psychology), as many conference papers, and ten book chapters.

== Awards ==
- 1991: Rousseau/IBM Award for best interdisciplinary researcher, ACFAS
- 1994: Stephen J. Shaw Award, Southern Marketing Conference; first non-American recipient of this award
- 1996: Fellow of the Royal Society of Canada
- 1997: Pierre-Laurin-Award for the Best Researcher of the Year at HEC
- 1997: Distinguished Scholar of the Society for Marketing Advances
- 2001: Fellow of the Japan Society for the Promotion of Science
- 2001: Fellow of the American Psychological Association
- 2003: Fellow of the Society for Marketing Advances
- 2003: Pierre-Laurin-Award for the Best Researcher of the Year at HEC
- 2004: Knight of the National Order of Quebec
- 2005: Sir John William Dawson Medal
