= Catherine Potvin =

Tropical forest ecologist

- Catherine Jeanne Potvin
- Born: October 1, 1957 (age 68); Saint-Hyacinthe
- Education: University of Montreal (Bachelor of Science and Master of Science); Duke University (Doctor of Philosophy)
- Children: 3
- Awards: Miroslaw Romanowski Medal; Canada Research Chair; Pierre Elliott Trudeau Foundation Fellowship
- Scientific career
- Fields: Forest ecology; Biodiversity; Conservation
- Institutions: McGill University
- Website: www.mcgill.ca/potvin-lab/

Catherine Potvin is a tropical forest ecologist and emeritus professor at McGill University in the Department of Biology. Her scientific research studies climate change, carbon cycling, and biodiversity in tropical rainforests with an additional focus on community empowerment and climate change policy. She was the first woman to receive the Miroslaw Romanowski Medal from the Royal Society of Canada, in recognition of her "significant contributions to the resolution of scientific aspects of environmental problems". In addition to her scientific research, she works on sustainable development with indigenous communities in Panama and on policy as a former UN climate change negotiator for Panama and leads climate change initiatives in Canada.

== Early life and education ==
As the granddaughter of farmers, Catherine Potvin grew up with an appreciation for nature. Her motivation to pursue biology stemmed from her fascination and desire to better understand the biodiversity of the Earth and a concern for its degradation. Potvin earned a B.S. (1981) and M.S. (1982) from the University of Montreal in Biology, and later earned her Ph.D. in Botany from Duke University (1985). After her Ph.D., Potvin returned to the University of Montreal for her postdoctoral studies in biostatistics.

== Research and career ==
=== Scientific contributions ===
Potvin has published over 100 scientific journal articles and multiple book chapters. In addition to her professorship at McGill University, she is a Trottier Fellow from the Trottier Institute for Science and Public Policy at McGill and holds a Canada Research Chair in Climate Change Mitigation and Tropical Forest. Potvin's research focuses on climate change and carbon cycling in the tropics with an interdisciplinary lens of socioeconomic and policy aspects of land use changes. The unifying theme of her work and laboratory is "Science for empowerment", which has provided an integrative framework for her work with diverse stakeholders including scientists, citizens, indigenous communities, and governments. Her work has received the Miroslaw Romanowski Medal from the Royal Society of Canada in recognition of her scientific work as "significant contributions to the resolution of scientific aspects of environmental problems".

=== Initiatives in Panama ===
Potvin has been working in the rainforests and with indigenous communities of Panama since 1993. She is an Associate Scientist at the Smithsonian Tropical Research Institute in Panama. In the mid-1990s, Potvin laid the foundation for a long and deep partnership with the Ipeti-Embera indigenous community in the Bayano region of eastern Panama. She has paved the way for more collaborative scientist-indigenous community partnerships to promote land conservation, resilient livelihoods, and preservation of cultural traditions. Through co-developing methods for sustainable forest management and carbon storage measurement with the community, her work has helped the Ipeti-Embera continue their traditional house-building using palm, traditional instrument making, and cultural body painting. As a result of this collaborative partnership and forest carbon studies, her work has directly slowed the rate of deforestation in the Ipeti community, with about half of their territory remaining forested in contrast to a neighboring Embera community that has lost its forest. Her work has encouraged Embera leaders to continue forest carbon measuring campaigns with support from the Environmental Defense Fund and the World Bank. In addition to her capacity building work with indigenous communities, she is also a negotiator of the Reduction of Emissions from Deforestation and forest Degradation (REDD+) initiative on behalf of Panama in the United Nations Framework Convention on Climate Change (2005-2009). Her environmental protection work in Panama has been recognized as exemplary contributions by the Ministry of the Environment of Panama.

=== Policy work ===
In addition to her research, she is a scientist-activist that has gained experience in national and international climate change and conservation policy. In addition to being a UN climate change negotiator in Panama, she pioneered and leads Sustainable Canada Dialogues, which is a collaborative network of 80+ Canadian scholars mobilizing to craft a national climate action plan. Sustainable Canada Dialogues emphasizes the importance of an energy transition that improves human livelihoods and the environment by opening opportunities for innovation and employment. The scholars come from diverse academic backgrounds, including sociology, business, biology, and engineering, to provide interdisciplinary and evidence-based solutions relevant to all regions of Canada. Their most recent report was sponsored by the Department of Natural Resources Canada which proposed 10 policy orientations to achieve 100% low-carbon electricity by 2035.

== Major publications ==
As of December 2020, Potvin has an h-index of 44 and has published over 100 scientific articles in journals and book chapters with over 7859 citations. She has published in the areas of tropical forest ecology, global change biology, biostatistics, and forest management. Her most cited works are listed below:

Potvin, C., Lechowicz, M. J., & Tardif, S. (1990). The statistical analysis of ecophysiological response curves obtained from experiments involving repeated measures. Ecology, 71(4), 1389-1400.

Potvin, C., & Roff, D. A. (1993). Distribution-free and robust statistical methods: viable alternatives to parametric statistics. Ecology, 74(6), 1617-1628.

Wilsey, B. J., & Potvin, C. (2000). Biodiversity and ecosystem functioning: importance of species evenness in an old field. Ecology, 81(4), 887-892.

Kirby, K. R., & Potvin, C. (2007). Variation in carbon storage among tree species: implications for the management of a small-scale carbon sink project. Forest Ecology and Management, 246(2-3), 208-221.

== Awards and honors ==
2021: Awarded Sir John William Dawson Medal of the Royal Society of Canada for 'important and sustained contributions to interdisciplinary research'

2018: Invited to be a member of Minister McKenna's Independent Working Group for Parks Canada to "review Parks Canada decision-making processes and make recommendations to ensure that maintaining ecological and commemorative integrity are priority considerations in decision-making".

2016: Fellow of Pierre Elliott Trudeau Foundation.

2016: Named as a Canadian Pioneer by the Canadian Government's Minister for Women and Gender Equality.

2015: Fellow of the Royal Society of Canada.

2014: Awarded the "Bold Vision" for Canada by the Canadian Women's Foundation which selects 23 women for their renowned work in diverse fields of politics, business, culture and sciences.

2014: Recipient of a Tier 1 Canada Research Chair, titled Climate Change Mitigation and Tropical Forests, which is "one of Canada's most prestigious research programs is attracting innovative and talented minds to Canada".

2013-2015: Trottier Fellow of the Trottier Institute for Science and Public Policy (TISPP) at McGill University.

2012: Awarded the Miroslaw Romanowski Medal by the Royal Society of Canada.

== Press ==
2018: Montreal Gazette—Opinion: Yes, there is something you can do to fight climate change.

2016: Radio-Canada—Catherine Potvin, the tropical biologist expert in climate change.

2014: Montreal Gazette—Protests aim to bring attention to need to act on climate change.
