= Peter Sneath =

British microbiologist

Peter H. A. Sneath
- Born: 17 November 1923
- Died: 9 September 2011 (aged 87)
- Education: University of Cambridge
- Known for: numerical taxonomy
- Awards: Fellow of the Royal Society
- Scientific career
- Fields: microbiology
- Workplaces: University of Leicester
- Thesis: The bacterial genus Chromobacterium (1959)
- Author abbrev. (botany): Sneath

Peter Henry Andrews Sneath FRS, MD (17 November 1923 – September 9, 2011) was a British microbiologist who co-founded the field of numerical taxonomy, together with Robert R. Sokal. Sneath and Sokal wrote Principles of Numerical Taxonomy, revised in 1973 as Numerical Taxonomy. Sneath reviewed the state of numerical taxonomy in 1995 and wrote some autobiographical notes in 2010.

A special issue of the journal Antonie van Leeuwenhoek, on microbial systematics, is dedicated to the memory of Peter Sneath.
