= Robert R. Sokal =

Biostatistician

Robert Sokal
- Born: January 13, 1926; Vienna, Austria
- Died: April 9, 2012 (aged 86); Stony Brook, New York
- Education: Saint John's University, Shanghai; University of Chicago
- Known for: Biometry; Numerical taxonomy
- Scientific career
- Fields: Biostatistics
- Workplaces: Stony Brook University
- Doctoral advisor: Alfred E. Emerson
- Doctoral students: Marie-Josée Fortin

Robert Reuven Sokal (January 13, 1926, in Vienna, Austria – April 9, 2012, in Stony Brook, New York) was an Austrian–American biostatistician and entomologist. Distinguished Professor Emeritus at the Stony Brook University, Sokal was a member of the National Academy of Sciences and the American Academy of Arts and Sciences. He promoted the use of statistics in biology and co-founded the field of numerical taxonomy, together with Peter H. A. Sneath.

== Life ==
Sokal was born in 1926 in a Jewish family in Vienna, Austria. In 1939, following the annexation of Austria by Nazi Germany, he escaped with his family to China. He earned his bachelor's degree at St. John's College in Shanghai, where he married, and from there moved with his wife Julie to the University of Chicago, where he also worked as a librarian to complement his scholarship. He took his Ph.D. degree under the supervision of the well-known termite systematist Alfred E. Emerson. He was also strongly influenced by Sewall Wright, who served on his dissertation committee. Sokal developed an interest for statistics and quantitative biology.

In 1959, Sokal moved to the University of Kansas where he developed—initially in collaboration with Charles Duncan Michener—quantitative techniques for classifying organisms and building dendrograms, which later came to be called numerical taxonomy methods. At the State University of New York, Stony Brook, in collaboration with F. James Rohlf, Sokal worked on new statistical methods for the analysis of geographic variation. His interests shifted to anthropology and population genetics, and he directed studies on the population history of Europe as inferred from genetic and ethnohistorical data. Along with Luca Cavalli-Sforza, Sokal pioneered the comparative study of linguistic and genetic variation.

== Awards and honors ==
- Fellow, American Association for the Advancement of Science, 1983
- Fellow, American Academy of Arts and Sciences, 1986
- Guggenheim Fellowship, 1975, 1983
- Member, United States National Academy of Sciences, 1987
- Doctor of Science (honorary), University of Crete, Iraklion, 1990
- Distinguished Statistical Ecologist Award, International Association for Ecology, 1994
- Darwin Lifetime Achievement Award, American Association of Physical Anthropologists, 2004

== Works ==
=== Selected scientific bibliography (original articles) ===
- Sokal, Michener (1958). "A statistical method for evaluating systematic relationships". University of Kansas Science Bulletin. 38: 1409–1438.
- Sokal, R R (March 1988). "Genetic, geographic, and linguistic distances in Europe". Proceedings of the National Academy of Sciences. 85 (5): 1722–1726. doi:10.1073/pnas.85.5.1722. PMC 279847.
- Barbujani, G; Sokal, R R (March 1990). "Zones of sharp genetic change in Europe are also linguistic boundaries". Proceedings of the National Academy of Sciences. 87 (5): 1816–1819. doi:10.1073/pnas.87.5.1816. PMC 53574.
- Sokal RR, Oden NL, Wilson C. (1991) "Genetic evidence for the spread of agriculture in Europe by demic diffusion." Nature 351:143-145.
- Chen J, Sokal RR, Ruhlen M. (1995) "Worldwide analysis of genetic and linguistic relationships of human populations." Human Biology 67:595-612.
- Barbujani G, Sokal RR, Oden NL. (1995) "Indo-European origins: a computer-simulation test of five hypotheses." American Journal of Physical Anthropology 96:109-132.
- Sokal R.R., Oden N.L., Rosenberg M.S., Thomson B.A.(2000) "Cancer incidences in Europe related to mortalities, and ethnohistoric, genetic, and geographic distances." Proceedings of the National Academy of Sciences USA 97:6067-6072.

=== Selected scientific bibliography (books) ===
- Sokal R.R. and Sneath P.H.E. (1963) Principles of Numerical Taxonomy. Freeman & Co., San Francisco
- Sneath P.H.E. and Sokal R.R. (1973) Principles of Numerical Taxonomy. Freeman & Co., San Francisco
- Sokal R.R. and Rohlf F.J. (1987) Introduction to Biostatistics. Freeman & Co., New York ISBN 978-0-7167-1805-5
- Sokal R.R. and Rohlf F.J. (2012) Biometry. 4th ed. Freeman & Co., New York ISBN 978-0-7167-8604-7
- Rohlf, F. James; Sokal, Robert R. (1995). Statistical Tables. Macmillan. ISBN 978-0-7167-2412-4.

== See also ==
- Caminalcules
- Gabriel graph
