= Numerical taxonomy =

Classification system in biological systematics

Numerical taxonomy is a classification system in biological systematics which deals with the grouping by numerical methods of taxonomic units based on their character states. It aims to create a taxonomy using numeric algorithms like cluster analysis rather than using subjective evaluation of their properties. The concept was first developed by Robert R. Sokal and Peter H. A. Sneath in 1963 and later elaborated by the same authors. They divided the field into phenetics in which classifications are formed based on the patterns of overall similarities and cladistics in which classifications are based on the branching patterns of the estimated evolutionary history of the taxa.In recent years many authors treat numerical taxonomy and phenetics as synonyms despite the distinctions made by those authors.

Although intended as an objective method, in practice the choice and implicit or explicit weighting of characteristics is influenced by available data and research interests of the investigator. What was made objective was the introduction of explicit steps to be used to create dendrograms and cladograms using numerical methods rather than subjective synthesis of data.

== See also ==
- Computational phylogenetics
- Taxonomy (biology)
