= John Pomeroy (hydrologist) =

Cold regions hydrologist (born 1960)

- Born: 1960
- Education: University of Saskatchewan
- Employer: University of Saskatchewan
- Awards: J. Tuzo Wilson Medal (2017); Miroslaw Romanowski Medal (2019); Bancroft Award (2026)

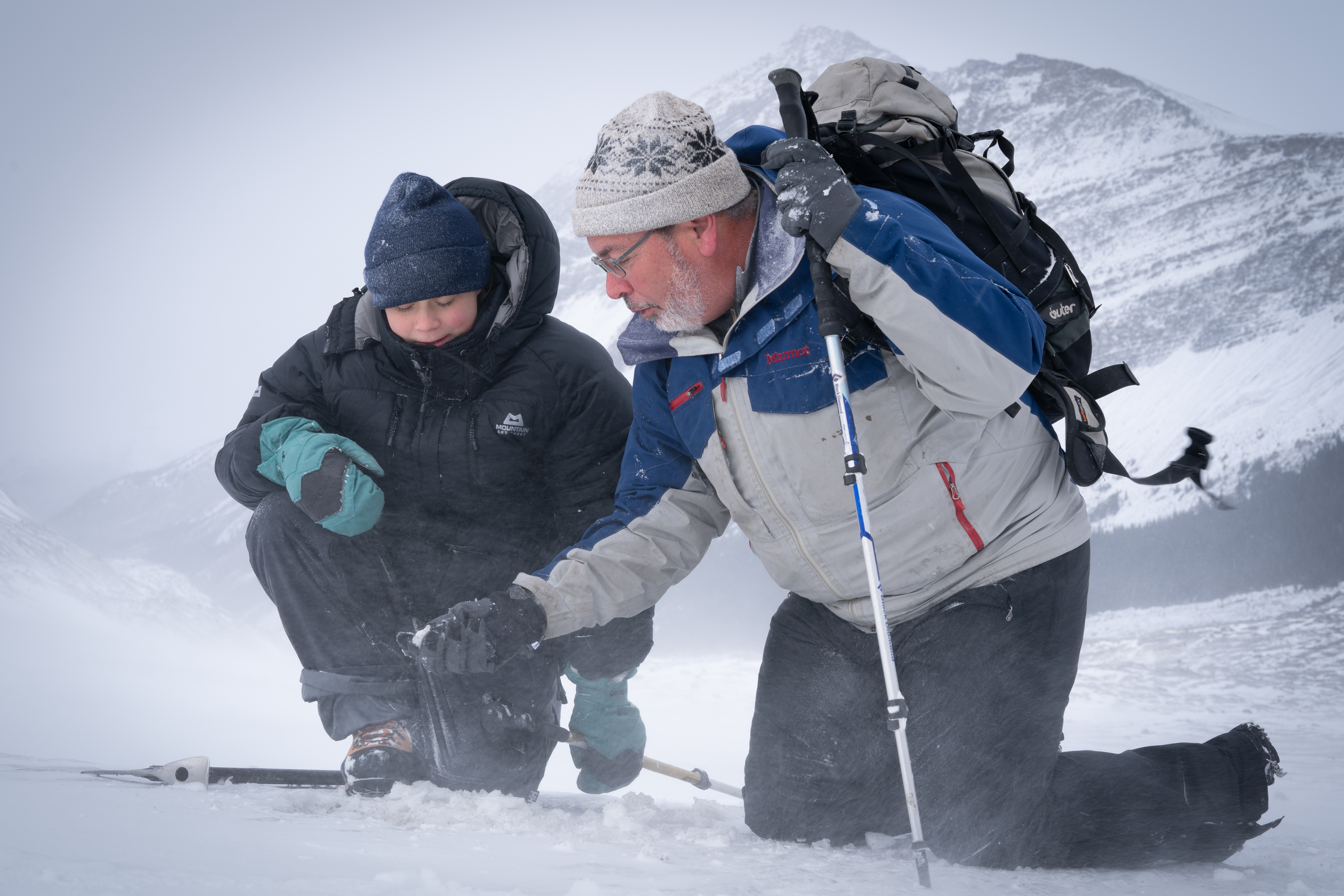
Greta Thunberg and John Pomeroy at the Athabasca Glacier, 2019

John Pomeroy is a hydrologist based in Canada who studies glaciers, snow hydrology, and hydrological modelling. He has helped to develop hydrological technologies and methodologies used world-wide. In 2026, Pomeroy received the Royal Society of Canada (RSC) Bancroft Award for his contributions to public understanding and appreciation of earth sciences. In 2025, he was awarded the International Hydrology Prize - Dooge Medal by the International Association of Hydrological Sciences to recognize his work in climate science and the understanding of hydrological processes and predictions. He has also received the Miroslaw Romanowski Medal (2019) and the J. Tuzo Wilson Medal (2017).

Pomeroy is a Distinguished Professor in the Department of Geography and Planning of the College of Arts and Science at the University of Saskatchewan (USask) and director of the USask Centre for Hydrology. He is a member of the Global Institute for Water Security (GIWS). He is the Director of the Global Water Futures (GWF) program and the Global Water Futures Observatories (GWFO), a world-wide university-led program for freshwater research and monitoring. He became the primary chairperson of the UNESCO Chair in Mountain Water Sustainability in 2023.

Pomeroy was the founding President of the International Commission for Snow and Ice Hydrology (ICSIH) serving from 2005-2013 and President of the Canadian Geophysical Union from 2007-2009. He has served as Chair of the International Decade for Predictions in Ungauged Basins. He is a Fellow of the Royal Geographical Society (2004), the American Geophysical Union (2013) and the Royal Society of Canada (2018).

== Early life and education ==
John Pomeroy grew up in Cleveland, Ohio near Lake Erie, which at the time was heavily polluted. After an initial year at the University of Indiana to study astrophysics, Pomeroy transferred to the University of Saskatchewan. He received his BSc from the Department of Geography in 1983, and his PhD in Agricultural Engineering from the College of Engineering in 1988.

"Studying snow and ice and hydrology is almost like going to another planet for many people. It's such a different world up on the ice and in the polar regions and in the high mountains."–John Pomeroy

== Career ==
Pomeroy has been a guest scientist at the National Research Institute for Earth Science and Disaster Prevention in Japan (1998); a NATO Science Fellow at the University of East Anglia, England (1988–89); a Research Scientist with the U.S. Department of Agriculture (1988–89); a Research Scientist with Environment Canada (1990-2000); and the first Professor of Hydrology in Wales, being appointed in 2001 to a personal chair at the University of Wales, Aberystwyth.

Next Pomeroy was recruited to the University of Saskatchewan (USask), becoming a Tier 1 Canada Research Chair in Water Resources and Climate Change in 2003. In 2004 he founded and became Director of the USask Centre for Hydrology. He became a member of the Board of Directors of the Western Watersheds Climate Research Collaborative in Canmore, Alberta in 2008. In 2009, he became Director of the Coldwater Laboratory in Canmore.

He is part of the Global Institute for Water Security, serving on its Executive Committee from 2011-2020. He helped to create the Global Water Futures (GWF) research program, serving first as associate director, and later as director. Groundwork for GWF was laid by Pomeroy, and others in 2008 at an international meeting in Canmore, Alberta. In 2018, Pomeroy became Director of the Smart Water Systems Laboratory. In 2023, Pomeroy became Director of the Global Water Futures Observatories (GWFO) of the University of Saskatchewan, a program for world-wide freshwater research and monitoring.

Pomeroy became the primary UNESCO Chair in Mountain Water Sustainability as of 2023. He co-chaired the United Nations Advisory Board for the 2025 International Year of Glaciers' Preservation and Chair of the Ad Hoc Committee for the Decade of Action for Cryospheric Sciences (DACS).

== Research ==
Pomeroy has carried out research around the world, in countries including Canada, the United States, Bolivia, China, Chile, Japan, Nepal, Russia, Scotland and Wales. His field research sites in Canada include Saskatoon, Saskatchewan; Canmore, Alberta; and Fortress Mountain in Alberta.

In early work, Pomeroy studied acid snow storms in the Scottish Highlands and acidification of snow in the Canadian Arctic. That research contributed to the scientific underpinning of agreements between the United States, Canada and Europe which solved the problem of acidification.

In his later career, Pomeroy has carried out research and policy work around climate change. As director of Global Water Futures (GWF), Pomeroy has led an effort to quantify water conditions in an area of more than 5 million square kilometers. The work has involved 65 individual projects, with funding to 23 universities, over a 10-year period. Among the changes observed in western Canada are the expansion of deciduous forest in the northern prairies, declining snowpacks, the increasing incidence of wildfires, and the depletion of glaciers. Pomeroy's mapping and modelling work is important in predicting possible trends and future outcomes. Pomeroy's Cold Regions Hydrological Model is a standard predictive model for Western Canada and other cold regions.

One of the sites he has studied is the Peyto Glacier in Banff National Park. In 2025 Pomeroy reported that the glacier had retreated 450 metres since 2019. He predicts that the glacier may be gone within 10 years. Changes in glaciation are altering conditions in commonly used hiking and climbing areas, making travel in the mountains more dangerous.

The duration of snowcover in the Canadian Rockies has decreased by four to six weeks compared to the early 1970s. Alberta's glaciers and mountain snowmelt feed the South Saskatchewan River, determining water availability for the province and people of Saskatchewan. This is essential to wildlife, fisheries, and farming throughout the western provinces, and lack of moisture increases the likelihood of drought and wildfires. In addition to irrigation, decreasing water supplies will affect water availability to cities and generation of hydroelectric power. In the area of climate change, researchers have been less successful in inspiring political change and concrete action.

"We're seeing new climates emerging in Western Canada and we don't fully understand them yet and what they'll mean. We will have to adapt very quickly in how we manage water and manage every aspect of our lives,"–John Pomeroy

== Contributions to science ==
John Pomeroy has made major contributions to the science of hydrology through his research about snow and ice, chemistry and physics, climate change impacts, hydrometeorological observations prediction using physically based models, agricultural and forest hydrology, cold regions ecohydrology, and water sustainability.

He developed the basic theory of saltation and suspension transport of blowing snow and its in-transit sublimation that underpins most snow redistribution theories and models around the world. As a founding contributor, and later Chair of the IAHS Decade on Predictions in Ungauged Basins, Pomeroy developed the modular, physically based, multi-physics Cold Regions Hydrological Modelling Platform (CRHM) for diagnosing and predicting cold regions hydrology, used to evaluate new process representations and land use and climate change impacts on hydrology. HIs work leading the Global Water Futures program raised awareness of water research and its importance in understanding and adapting to climate change in both Canada and internationally. To determine future water supplies in cold regions, Pomeroy has used CHRM and MESH models to diagnose future climate change impacts on hydrology using combinations of statistically and dynamically downscaled climate models. These results show earlier freshets, reduced snowmelt peaks, increased evapotranspiration and rainfall-runoff and greatly decreased summer streamflow within the context of rising annual discharge volumes due to increased rainfall—climate change impacts in cold regions freshwater supply that contribute to the global water crisis. Pomeroy developed the theory of snow interception in forest canopies and its subsequent sublimation (Pomeroy and Schmidt, 1993; Pomeroy et al., 1998a; Hedstrom and Pomeroy, 1998) that is now used in forest hydrology and models around the world.

== Awards and honors ==
- 2025, International Hydrology Prize - Dooge Medal, a joint award from the International Association of Hydrological Sciences (IAHS), United Nations Educational, Scientific and Cultural Organization (UNESCO), and World Meteorological Organization (WMO).
- 2021, Walter Langbein Lecture Award for hydrology, American Geophysical Union
- 2019, Miroslaw Romanowski Medal for environmental science, Royal Society of Canada
- 2017, J. Tuzo Wilson Medal for geophysics, Canadian Geophysical Union

== Selected works ==
Pomeroy has published at least a dozen books and more than 400 scholarly papers.

- Pomeroy, J.W.; Davies, T.D.; Ivanov, G.V. (2025). The Great Thaw: a homage in art to the vanishing cryosphere. Paris, France: United Nations Educational, Scientific and Cultural Organization (UNESCO). ISBN 978-92-3-100751-4.
- Pomeroy, J W; Whitfield, P H; Spence, C (2013). Putting Prediction in Ungauged Basins into Practice (PDF). Canadian Water Resources Association. ISBN 978-1-896513-38-6.
- The Expert Panel on Sustainable Management of Water in the Agricultural Landscapes of Canada (2013). Water and Agriculture in Canada: Towards Sustainable Management of Water Resources (PDF). Ottawa, Canada: Council of Canadian Academies. ISBN 978-1-926558-56-1.
- Hrachowitz, M.; Savenije, H.H.G.; Blöschl, G.; McDonnell, J.J.; Sivapalan, M.; Pomeroy, J.W.; Arheimer, B.; Blume, T.; Clark, M.P.; Ehret, U.; Fenicia, F.; Freer, J.E.; Gelfan, A.; Gupta, H.V.; Hughes, D.A.; Hut, R.W.; Montanari, A.; Pande, S.; Tetzlaff, D.; Troch, P.A.; Uhlenbrook, S.; Wagener, T.; Winsemius, H.C.; Woods, R.A.; Zehe, E.; Cudennec, C. (1 August 2013). "A decade of Predictions in Ungauged Basins (PUB)—a review". Hydrological Sciences Journal. 58 (6): 1198–1255. Bibcode:2013HydSJ..58.1198H. doi:10.1080/02626667.2013.803183. ISSN 0262-6667.
- The Expert Panel on Groundwater (2009). The sustainable management of groundwater in Canada (PDF). Ottawa: Council of Canadian Academies. ISBN 978-1-926558-11-0.
- Pomeroy, J. W.; Gray, D. M.; Brown, T.; Hedstrom, N. R.; Quinton, W. L.; Granger, R. J.; Carey, S. K. (2007). "The cold regions hydrological model: a platform for basing process representation and model structure on physical evidence". Hydrological Processes. 21 (19): 2650–2667. Bibcode:2007HyPr...21.2650P. doi:10.1002/hyp.6787. ISSN 1099-1085.
- Sivapalan, M.; Takeuchi, K.; Franks, S. W.; Gupta, H.; Karambiri, H.; Lakshmi, V.; Liang, X.; McDonnell, J. J.; Mendiondo, E. M.; O'Connell, P. E.; Oki, T.; Pomeroy, J. W.; Schertzer, D.; Uhlenbrook, S.; Zehe, E. (1 December 2003). "IAHS Decade on Predictions in Ungauged Basins (PUB), 2003–2012: Shaping an exciting future for the hydrological sciences". Hydrological Sciences Journal. 48 (6): 857–880. Bibcode:2003HydSJ..48..857S. doi:10.1623/hysj.48.6.857.51421. ISSN 0262-6667.
- Hedstrom, N. R.; Pomeroy, J. W. (August 1998). "Measurements and modelling of snow interception in the boreal forest". Hydrological Processes. 12 (10–11): 1611–1625. Bibcode:1998HyPr...12.1611H. doi:10.1002/(SICI)1099-1085(199808/09)12:10/11<1611::AID-HYP684>3.0.CO;2-4.
- Pomeroy, J. W.; Gray, Donald M. (1995). Snowcover accumulation, relocation and management (PDF). Saskatoon, Saskatchewan, Canada: National Hydrology Research Institute. ISBN 978-0-660-15816-7.
