= Roger Falconer =

Welsh professor

Roger Falconer FREng MAE FLSW FICE
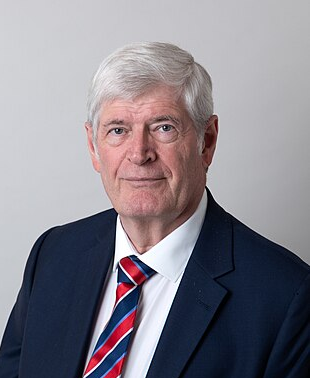
- Roger A. Falconer
- Born: Roger Alexander Falconer; 12 December 1951 (age 74); Carmarthen, Wales
- Education: King's College London (BSc); University of Washington (MS); Imperial College London (PhD)
- Scientific career
- Fields: Hydraulic engineering; Fluid mechanics; Tidal power; Hydropower; Water security
- Workplaces: University of Birmingham; University of Bradford; Cardiff University; Hohai University
- Website: profiles.cardiff.ac.uk/emeritus/falconerra

Roger Alexander Falconer FREng MAE FLSW (born 1951) is a British civil engineer and academic specialising in water and environmental engineering. He is emeritus professor of hydro-environmental engineering at Cardiff University and was president of the International Association for Hydro-Environment Engineering and Research (IAHR) from 2011 to 2015. He is a Fellow of the Royal Academy of Engineering, an international Member of the Chinese Academy of Engineering, a Member of the Academia Europaea and a Fellow of the Learned Society of Wales.

Falconer's research focuses on computational and laboratory modelling of flow, water quality and sediment transport in rivers, estuaries and coastal waters. His work includes applications to environmental impact assessment, flood-risk management, tidal energy and water security.

== Education ==
Falconer attended Llandeilo Grammar School and Bridgend Boys' Grammar School in Wales between 1962 and 1970. He studied civil engineering at King's College London, graduating with a BSc(Eng) in 1973. He received a master's degree in hydraulic engineering from the University of Washington in 1974 before returning to the United Kingdom to undertake doctoral research in computational hydraulics at Imperial College London. He graduated with a PhD and the Diploma of Imperial College in 1976.

He received two higher doctorates: a Doctor of Engineering degree from the University of Birmingham in 1992 and a Doctor of Science in Engineering degree from the University of London in 1994. The University of Bradford awarded him an honorary Doctor of Engineering degree in 2022.

== Career ==
Falconer joined the University of Birmingham as a lecturer in hydraulics. He remained there until 1986, teaching and conducting research in computational hydraulics.

He subsequently became professor of water engineering at the University of Bradford, where he founded the Environmental Hydraulics Research Centre. He also served as head of the Department of Civil and Environmental Engineering before moving to Cardiff University in 1997.

At Cardiff, Falconer was professor of water management from 1997 to 2018 and founding director of the Hydro-environmental Research Centre. His chair was supported initially by Hyder Consulting and subsequently by Halcrow and CH2M. He also directed the university's Institute of Environment and Sustainability from 2003 to 2012. He became an emeritus professor in 2018.

Falconer has also held a chair professorship at Hohai University and its Yangtze Institute for Conservation and Development, collaborating on hydro-environmental research and international academic exchange.

== Research ==
Falconer's research focuses on computational and laboratory modelling of water flow, water quality and sediment transport in rivers, estuaries and coastal waters. He developed the one-dimensional FASTER, two-dimensional DIVAST and three-dimensional TRIVAST models, which have been widely applied in hydro-environmental impact assessment studies internationally. DIVAST forms part of the two-dimensional modelling suite incorporated within Flood Modeller, a software package owned by Jacobs Solutions.

His flood research includes experimental and numerical model studies of urban inundation, interactions between surface flows and sewer networks, and the stability of people and vehicles in floodwaters. At Cardiff University, he collaborated with researchers at Wuhan University on developing new formulae for assessing the stability of humans and vehicles in floods and methods for mapping flood hazards and planning evacuation routes.

Falconer has investigated the hydrodynamic and environmental effects of tidal-energy schemes, including barrages, lagoons and tidal-stream turbines. His work examines how their design and operation affect electricity generation, water levels, currents and water quality. Projects studied include proposals for the Severn Barrage and West Somerset Lagoon.

His water-quality research includes modelling the transport and decay of faecal bacteria in river networks and coastal waters, with applications to bathing-water assessment. He has also studied disinfection processes in water-treatment systems.

Falconer has contributed to water-security and water-transfer initiatives, including the Royal Academy of Engineering's Global Water Security project and proposals to transfer water from Wales to southeast England. He also advises the non-profit organisation Global Empowers on water access and security initiatives in southern Africa.

He has contributed to public discussion of water security, flooding, tidal energy and dam failure.

== Professional service ==
Falconer served as president of IAHR from 2011 to 2015. He was a trustee of the Chartered Institution of Water and Environmental Management from 2016 to 2021 and chaired its Professional Standards Committee. He served as an elected member of the council of the Institution of Civil Engineers from 2000 to 2004 and chaired its Yorkshire Association from 1995 to 1996.

He served on the Civil Engineering Sub-panel for the 2008 Research Assessment Exercise and chaired the Civil and Construction Engineering Sub-panel for the 2014 Research Excellence Framework.

His editorial roles have included serving as a founding editor of the Journal of Hydroinformatics, the International Journal of River Basin Management and the Institution of Civil Engineers' journal Water Management. He was an associate editor of the Journal of Hydraulic Engineering from 1994 to 2001.

== Public and policy work ==
Falconer served on the UK government's expert panel for the Severn tidal power feasibility studies from 2008 to 2010 and provided technical advice to the Hendry Review of tidal lagoons in 2016. He also served on the National Flood Resilience Scientific Advisory Group and the independent expert group that reviewed the London floods of July 2021.

His other public advisory appointments have included the Yorkshire Regional Flood and Coastal Committee and the Welsh Government's expert stakeholder group assessing the effects of Hinkley Point C nuclear power station.

In public discussion of flood management, Falconer has advocated adapting buildings and roads to withstand flooding. He has also supported interregional water transfers as a response to water shortages.

== International work ==
Falconer began collaborating with Chinese researchers through Tongji University in 1981. His work there included the design of harbours and marinas to improve water circulation and water quality. He subsequently collaborated with other Chinese universities and government institutions on water and environmental engineering.

At Tsinghua University, he collaborated on the development of CONTANT, a software tool for designing water-supply disinfection tanks. His work with Wuhan University addressed the stability of people and vehicles in floods. With Tianjin University and the Tianjin municipal government, he worked on modelling Bohai Bay and the Bohai Sea to assess the environmental effects of shipping-related development.

Falconer also worked on the environmental assessment of Singapore's land reclamation in and around the Straits of Johor. He acted as an expert witness for Malaysia in proceedings before the International Tribunal for the Law of the Sea in 2003 and subsequently co-chaired the group of independent experts examining the reclamation's environmental effects.

== Selected awards and honours ==
Falconer received the Arthur Thomas Ippen Award from IAHR in 1991 for his work on computational modelling of coastal and estuarine flows and associated environmental problems. He also received the Institution of Civil Engineers' Telford Premium and the Princess Royal Silver Medal (formerly the Royal Academy of Engineering Silver Medal) in 1999. The Institution of Civil Engineers awarded him the Robert Alfred Carr Prize in 2003 and 2007.

He was elected a Fellow of the Royal Academy of Engineering and the City and Guilds Institute in 1997, and a Fellow of the Learned Society of Wales in 2011. IAHR awarded him honorary fellowship in 2017. He became a Member of the European Academy of Sciences in 2018, an international member of the Chinese Academy of Engineering in 2019 and a member of Academia Europaea in 2026.

Falconer received the Chinese government's Friendship Award in 2022. The University of Bradford awarded him an honorary Doctor of Engineering degree that year. He received the Environmental Scientists Best Researcher Award in Water Science in 2025.

Falconer is a Chartered Engineer, Chartered Environmentalist and Chartered Water and Environmental Manager. He is also a Fellow of the Institution of Civil Engineers, the Chartered Institution of Water and Environmental Management and the American Society of Civil Engineers.
