= International waters =

Water outside of national jurisdiction

Oceanic international waters are the areas shown in dark blue in this map, i.e. outside exclusive economic zones, which are in light blue

The terms international waters or transboundary waters apply where any of the following types of bodies of water (or their drainage basins) transcend international boundaries: oceans, large marine ecosystems, enclosed or semi-enclosed regional seas and estuaries, rivers, lakes, groundwater systems (aquifers), and wetlands.

"International waters" is not a defined term in international law. It is an informal term, which sometimes refers to waters beyond the "territorial sea" of any country. In other words, "international waters" is sometimes used as an informal synonym for the more formal term "high seas", which under the doctrine of mare liberum (Latin for 'freedom of the seas'), do not belong to any state's jurisdiction. As such, states have the right to fishing, navigation, overflight, laying cables and pipelines, and scientific research.

The Convention on the High Seas, signed in 1958, which has 63 signatories, defined "high seas" to mean "all parts of the sea that are not included in the territorial sea or in the internal waters of a State" and where "no State may validly purport to subject any part of them to its sovereignty." The Convention on the High Seas was used as a foundation for the United Nations Convention on the Law of the Sea (UNCLOS), signed in 1982, which recognized exclusive economic zones extending 200 nautical miles (230 mi; 370 km) from the baseline, where coastal states have sovereign rights to the water column and sea floor as well as the natural resources found there.

The high seas make up 50% of the surface area of the planet and cover over two-thirds of the ocean.

Ships sailing the high seas are generally under the jurisdiction of the flag state (if there is one); however, when a ship is involved in certain criminal acts, such as piracy, any nation can exercise jurisdiction under the doctrine of universal jurisdiction. International waters can be contrasted with internal waters, territorial waters and exclusive economic zones.

UNCLOS also contains, in its part XII, special provisions for the protection of the marine environment, which, in certain cases, allow port States to exercise extraterritorial jurisdiction over foreign ships on the high seas if they violate international environmental rules (adopted by the IMO), such as the MARPOL Convention.

== Underground transboundary waters ==
When an underground water crosses international boundaries, the term transboundary aquifer applies. The term transboundariness can then be applied, which is a concept, measure and approach first introduced in 2017 when talking about underground transboundary waters.

The importance of this approach is that the physical properties of aquifers become merely additional variables within the broad spectrum of the transboundary nature of an aquifer: social (population); economic (groundwater efficiency); political (cross-border); existing research or data; water quality and quantity; other issues that drive the agenda (security, trade, immigration, etc.).

The criteria proposed through this approach attempt to encompass and quantify all potential variables that play a role in defining the transboundary nature and multidimensional boundaries of an underground transboundary water.

== International waterways ==
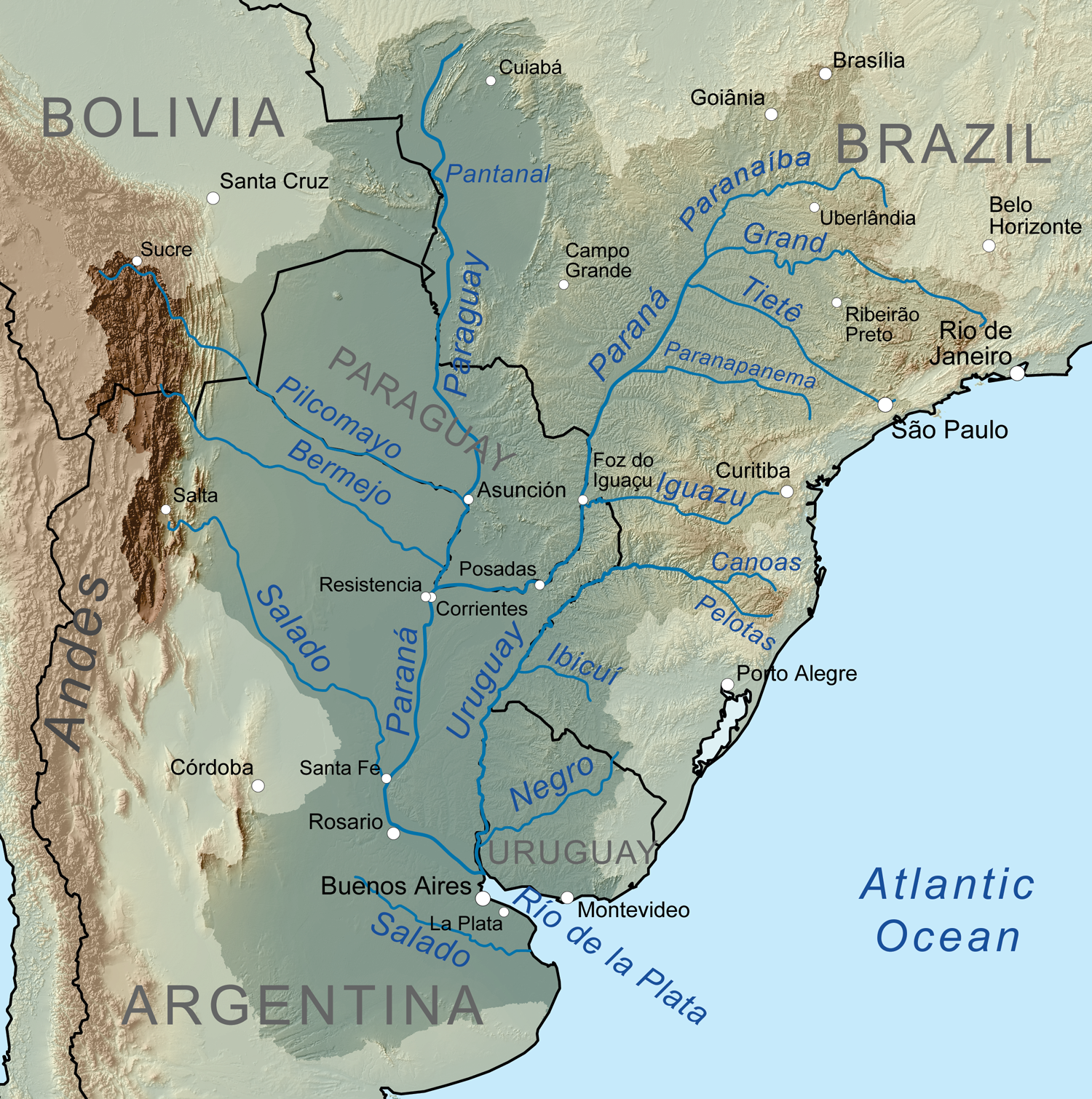
The Río de la Plata basin gives sea access to landlocked Paraguay and Bolivia, and navigation is free for all international commercial ships.

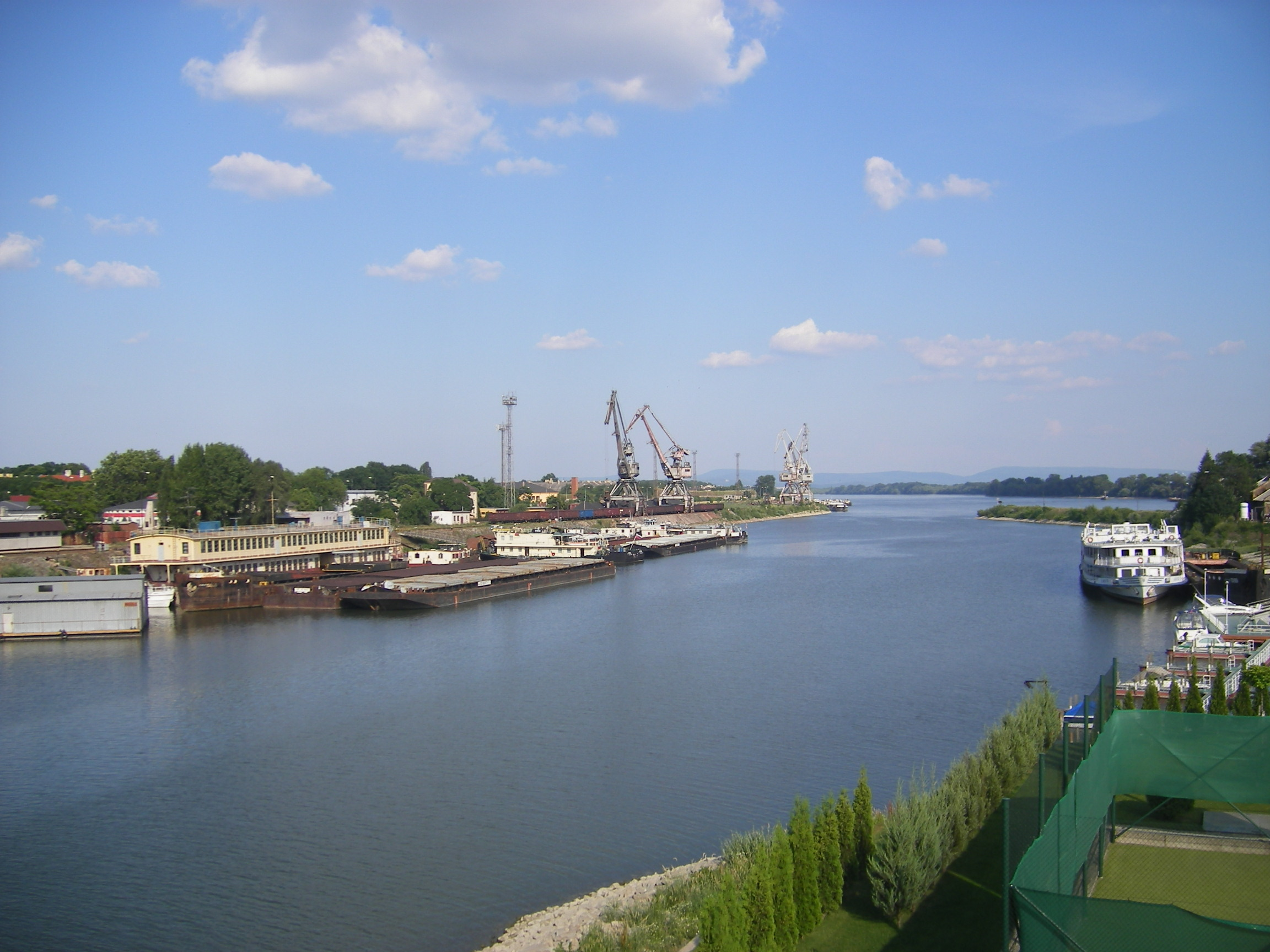
Komárno, in Slovakia, is an inland port on the Danube River, which is an important international waterway.

Several international treaties have established freedom of navigation on semi-enclosed seas.

- The Copenhagen Convention of 1857 opened access to the Baltic Sea by abolishing the Sound Dues and making the Danish Straits an international waterway free to all commercial shipping. Separately, the Royal Ordinance of 1999 regulates the access of foreign warships to Danish waters.
- Several conventions have opened the Bosphorus and Dardanelles to shipping. The latest, the Montreux Convention Regarding the Regime of the Turkish Straits, maintains the straits' status as an international waterway.

Other international treaties have opened up rivers, which are not traditionally international waterways.

- The Río de la Plata basin, including the rivers Paraná, Uruguay and Paraguay, is legally open for all international commercial ships without restriction, it notably gives sea access to landlocked Paraguay and Bolivia.
- The Danube River is an international waterway so that Germany and Croatia, as well as landlocked Austria, Slovakia, Hungary, Serbia and Moldova can have secure access to the Black Sea.

== Disputes over international waters ==
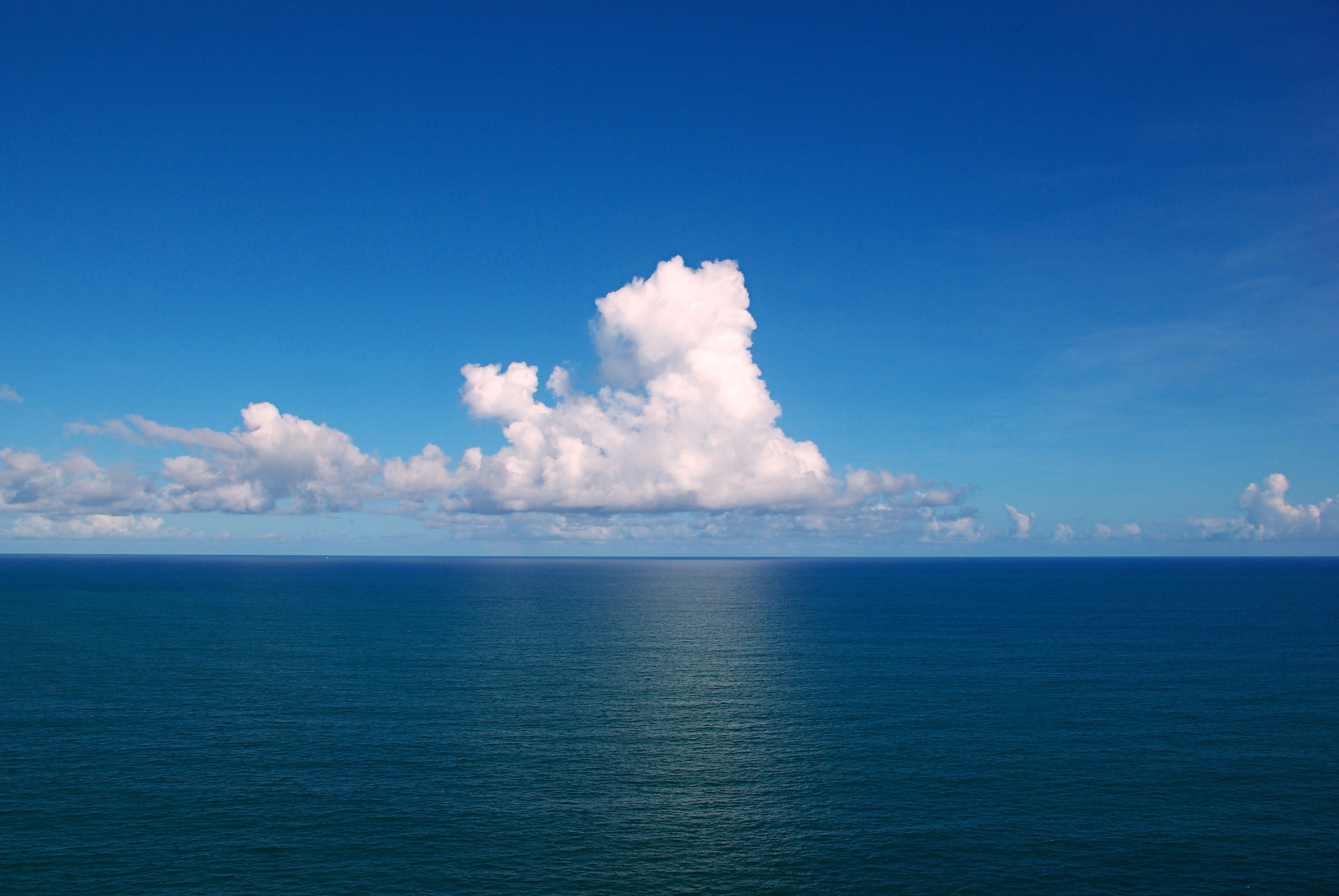
The Atlantic Ocean has the busiest ocean trade routes in the world.

Current unresolved disputes over whether particular waters are "International waters" include:

- Arctic Ocean: While Canada, Denmark, Russia and Norway all regard parts of the Arctic seas as national waters or internal waters, most European Union countries and the United States officially regard the whole region as international waters. The Northwest Passage through the Arctic Archipelago is one of the more prominent examples, with Canada claiming it as internal waters, while the United States and the European Union considers it an international strait.
- Southern Ocean: Australian claim to an exclusive economic zone (EEZ) in Antarctica is challenged by Japan.
- Okinotorishima: Japanese claim to an EEZ around Okinotorishima is challenged by China, South Korea, and Taiwan.
- South China Sea: Disputes exist between Brunei, China, Indonesia, Malaysia, the Philippines, Taiwan, and Vietnam.

== International waters agreements ==
Limits of national jurisdiction and sovereignty
Outer space (including Earth orbits; the Moon and other celestial bodies, and their orbits)
national airspace		territorial waters airspace	contiguous zone airspace	international airspace		
land territory surface	internal waters surface	territorial waters surface	contiguous zone surface	Exclusive Economic Zone surface	international waters surface (Note: The term "international waters" technically includes the "Contiguous Zone" and "Exclusive Economic Zone," although the chart only uses this term where no national jurisdiction or special rights apply.)	
internal waters		territorial waters	exclusive economic zone		international waters	
land territory underground		continental shelf surface			extended continental shelf surface	international seabed surface
land territory underground		continental shelf underground			extended continental shelf underground	international seabed underground

full national jurisdiction and sovereignty
restrictions on national jurisdiction and sovereignty
international jurisdiction per common heritage of mankind

=== Global agreements ===
- International Freshwater Treaties Database (freshwater only).
- The Yearbook of International Cooperation on Environment and Development profiles agreements regarding the Marine Environment, Marine Living Resources and Freshwater Resources.
- 1972 London Convention on the Prevention of Marine Pollution by Dumping of Wastes and Other Matter (London Convention 1972).
- 1973 London International Convention for the Prevention of Pollution from Ships, 1973 MARPOL
- 1982 United Nations Convention on Law of the Sea (United Nations Convention on Law of the Sea, United Nations; especially parts XII–XIV).
- 1997 United Nations Convention on the Law of Non-Navigational Uses of International Watercourses (CIW) – not ratified.
- Transboundary Groundwater Treaty, Bellagio Draft – proposed, but not signed.
- Other global conventions and treaties with implications for International Waters:
  - 1971 Ramsar Convention on Wetlands.
  - 1992 Convention on Biological Diversity.
  - 2023 High Seas Treaty (BBNJ Agreement)

=== Regional agreements ===
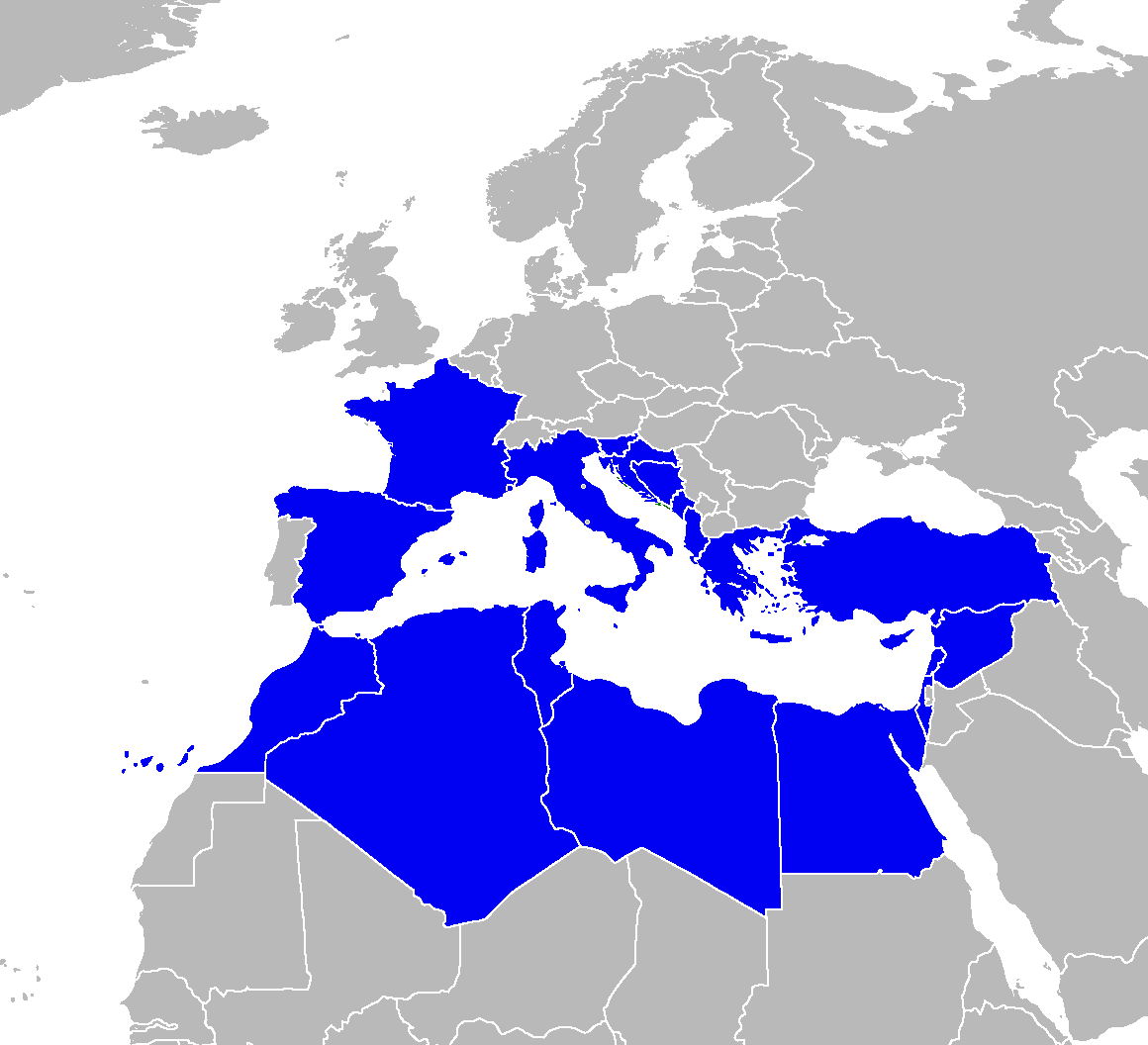
Map showing the parties of the Barcelona Convention

At least ten conventions are included within the Regional Seas Program of UNEP, including:

1. the Atlantic Coast of West and Central Africa
2. the North-East Pacific (Antigua Convention)
3. the Mediterranean (Barcelona Convention)
4. the wider Caribbean (Cartagena Convention)
5. the South-East Pacific
6. the South Pacific (Nouméa Convention)
7. the East African seaboard
8. the Kuwait region (Kuwait Convention)
9. the Red Sea and the Gulf of Aden (Jeddah Convention)

Addressing regional freshwater issues is the 1992 Helsinki Convention on the Protection and Use of Transboundary Watercourses and International Lakes (UNECE/Helsinki Water Convention)

=== Water-body-specific agreements ===
- Baltic Sea (Helsinki Convention on the Protection of the Marine Environment of the Baltic Sea Area, 1992)
- Black Sea (Bucharest Convention)
- Caspian Sea (Framework Convention for the Protection of the Marine Environment of the Caspian Sea)
- Lake Tanganyika (Convention for the Sustainable Management of Lake Tanganyika)

== International waters institutions ==
=== Freshwater institutions ===
- The UNESCO International Hydrological Programme (IHP)
- The International Joint Commission between Canada and United States (IJC-CMI)
- The International Network of Basin Organizations (INBO)
- The International Shared Aquifer Resource Management project
- The International Water Boundary Commission (US Section) between Mexico and United States
- The International Water Management Institute (IWMI)
- The IUCN Water and Nature Initiative (WANI)
- The Central Commission for the Navigation of the Rhine (CCNR)

=== Marine institutions ===
- The International Maritime Organization (IMO)
- The International Seabed Authority
- The International Whaling Commission
- The UNEP Regional Seas Programme
- The UNESCO Intergovernmental Oceanographic Commission (IOC)
- The International Ocean Institute
- The IUCN Global Marine and Polar Programme (GMPP)

== See also ==
- Baseline
- Birth aboard aircraft and ships
- Continental shelf
- Duty-free shop
- Extraterritoriality
- Extraterritorial jurisdiction
- Extraterritorial operation
- Freedom of the seas
- Hugo Grotius
- International zone
- Ocean colonization
- Overfishing
- Seasteading
