= Princess Royal Silver Medal =

British engineering award

The Princess Royal Silver Medal, formerly the Royal Academy of Engineering Silver Medal or "the Silver Medal", was established in 1994 by the Royal Academy of Engineering (the Academy or RAEng) to recognise outstanding and direct personal achievements and contributions to UK engineering for mid-career engineers.

The award was renamed when Princess Anne agreed to have it named in her honour, in view of her lifelong advocacy of engineering and as the Royal Fellow of the Academy. She had previously spoken of wanting to be an engineer as her career choice, in the absence of her royal duties.

== Background ==
Nominations open in early autumn with up to four medals a year awarded to outstanding engineers in their field with less than 22 years of full-time years of work in their career, so typically engineers who are in early to mid-career. Nominees must show how their contributions further the Academy's strategic goals including: a sustainable and innovative economy, improving lives with technology or supporting an engineering community fit for the future. Most crucially, nominees must demonstrate the commercial success and the overall positive impact of their work.

The first recipients of the award in 1995 were Peter Head CBE FREng, Director, G. Maunsell and Partners and Professor Martin Sweeting OBE FREng, Managing Director and CEO, Surrey Satellite Technology Ltd; Professor of Satellite Engineering, University of Surrey.

== Winners ==
Year	Recipient(s)	Contribution
2026	Dr. Liucheng Guo	Co-founder TG0: AI material/tactile sensing technology
2025	Alex Kendall	Co-founder of Wayve; deep learning for autonomous vehicles
2025	Themis Prodromakis	Work on memristors
2024	Katerina Spranger	Founder of Oxford Heartbeat
2024	Daniel Jamieson	Founder of Biorelate
2024	Orr Yarkoni	Biological textile dyeing
2024	Jason Hallett	Sustainable chemical processes
2023	Saritha Arunkumar	IBM security research
2023	Joel Gibbard and Samantha Payne	Co-founders of Open Bionics
2023	James Roberts	Neonatal incubator design
2022	Heba Bevan	Founder of UtterBerry
2022	Daniel Brett and Paul Shearing	Electrochemical Innovation Lab, UCL
2022	Oliver Payton	Atomic force microscopy
2022	Atif Syed	Electronic skin; founder of Wootzano
2021	Tom Carter	Ultrasound haptics; CTO of Ultraleap
2021	Andrew Lynn	Founder of Fluidic Analytics
2021	Sithamparanathan Sabesan	Founder of PervasID
2020	Marko Bacic	Rolls-Royce engine safety
2020	Michael Bronstein	Graph deep learning
2020	Esther Rodriguez-Villegas	Low-power wearable devices
2020	Jamie Shotton	Machine learning for Microsoft Kinect
2019	Daniel Elford	Acoustic metamaterials; CTO of Sonobex
2019	Jennifer Griffiths	Founder of Snaptech
2019	Paul Newman	Autonomous vehicle algorithms; founder of Oxbotica
2017	Billy Boyle	Breath-biomarker diagnostics; CEO of Owlstone Medical
2017	Rob Bishop and Zehan Wang	Founders of Magic Pony Technology
2017	Constantin Coussios	Organ preservation
2017	David Silver	Reinforcement learning; DeepMind
2016	Demis Hassabis	Co-founder and CEO of DeepMind
