= Hydroinformatics =

Branch of informatics

Hydroinformatics is a branch of informatics which concentrates on the application of information and communications technologies (ICTs) in addressing the increasingly serious problems of the equitable and efficient use of water for many different purposes. Growing out of the earlier discipline of computational hydraulics, the numerical simulation of water flows and related processes remains a mainstay of hydroinformatics, which encourages a focus not only on the technology but on its application in a social context.

On the technical side, in addition to computational hydraulics, hydroinformatics has a strong interest in the use of techniques originating in the so-called artificial intelligence community, such as artificial neural networks or recently support vector machines and genetic programming. These might be used with large collections of observed data for the purpose of data mining for knowledge discovery, or with data generated from an existing, physically based model in order to generate a computationally efficient emulator of that model for some purpose.

Hydroinformatics recognises the inherently social nature of the problems of water management and of decision-making processes, and strives to understand the social processes by which technologies are brought into use. Since the problems of water management are most severe in the majority world, while the resources to obtain and develop technological solutions are concentrated in the hands of the minority, the need to examine these social processes are particularly acute.

Hydroinformatics draws on and integrates hydraulics, hydrology, environmental engineering and many other disciplines. It sees application at all points in the water cycle from atmosphere to ocean, and in artificial interventions in that cycle such as urban drainage and water supply systems. It provides support for decision making at all levels from governance and policy through management to operations.

Hydroinformatics is studied by researchers and practitioners in several countries, and postgraduate programmes in the field are offered by a number of institutions. The Journal of Hydroinformatics publishes research related to the field. Biennial hydroinformatics conferences have also been coordinated by organisations including the IAHR, the IWA, and the IAHS.
