= Joseph Lee =

Joseph or Joe Lee may refer to:

== People ==
- Joe Lee (actor) (1956–2003), Hong Kong actor
- J. J. Lee (historian) (born 1942), known as Joe, Irish historian and senator
- Joseph Lee (actor) (born 1987), American actor
- Joseph Lee (poet) (1876–1949), Scottish poet, artist and journalist
- Joseph Lee (recreation advocate) (1862–1937), father of the playground movement
- Joseph Lee (Hong Kong politician) (Joseph Lee Kok-long, born 1959), nurse, and professor
- J. Bracken Lee (1899–1996), governor of Utah
- Joe Lee (squash player) (born 1989), English squash player
- Joseph Lee (American politician) (1901–1991), politician in Boston, Massachusetts
- Joseph E. Lee (1849–1920), American lawyer, judge and politician in Florida
- Joseph Lee (inventor) (1848–1908), American baker and inventor
- Joseph Hun-wei Lee, Chinese civil engineer
- Joseph Lee (footballer) (born 2002), New Zealand footballer

== Places ==
- Joseph Lee, Baltimore, a neighborhood in Baltimore
- Joe Lee, Texas, an unincorporated community in Bell County, Texas

== See also ==
- Joseph Lees (disambiguation)
