= Giuliano Di Baldassarre =

Italian academic

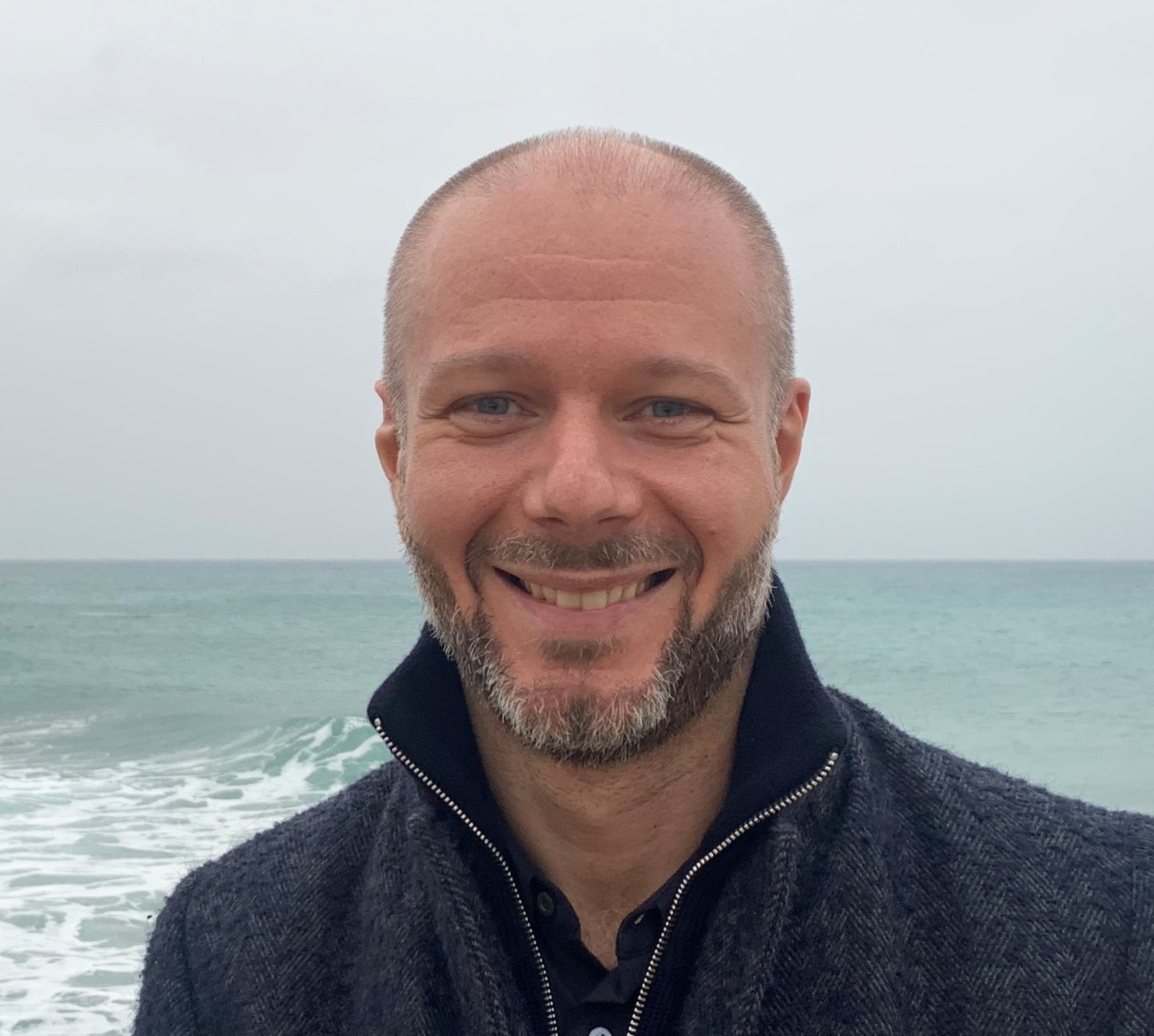
- Awards: International Hydrology Prize (2025) by IAHS, UNESCO & WMO EGU Plinius Medal (2021) AGU Whiterspoon Lecture Award (2020)

Academic background
- Education: University of Bologna (MSc, PhD)
- Thesis: Uncertainty in Flood Inundation Modeling

Academic work
- Institutions: Centre of Natural Hazards and Disaster Science Uppsala University University of Bristol UNESCO-IHE
- Main interests: socio-hydrology flood risk natural hazards coupled human-nature systems
- Website: https://katalog.uu.se/profile/?id=N14-377_1

Giuliano Di Baldassarre is a professor of hydrology at Uppsala University. His interdisciplinary research focuses on human-water interactions, droughts and floods. He has been the recipient of several awards, including the International Hydrology Prize, i.e. Volker Medal, by the International Association of Hydrological Sciences (IAHS) in 2025, the Plinius Medal by the European Geosciences Union (EGU) in 2021, and the Whiterspoon Lecture Award by the American Geophysical Union (AGU) in 2020

== Early life and education ==
He was born in L'Aquila in 1978. Di Baldassarre studied environmental engineering with a focus on water resources at University of Bologna where he graduated summa cum laude in 2002. After his PhD in hydrology in 2006, he continued his scientific career by doing a postdoc at the University of Bristol.

== Research and career ==
Di Baldassarre joined the UNESCO-IHE Institute for Water Education in Delft as a Senior Lecturer in 2009. He was awarded the EGU Outstanding Early Career Scientist Award (2012) and the AGU Early Career Hydrologic Science Award (2012) for his work on flood risk. He was also the project coordinator of the European Commission FP7 funded project KULTURisk – A knowledge-based approach to develop a culture of risk prevention in Europe (2011-2014).

Di Baldassarre joined Uppsala University in 2014, where he today is a professor of hydrology. He led the ERC Consolidator Grant project, HydroSocialExtremes, which addressed the interplay between hydrological extremes and society. In the period 2016-2025, he was the director of the Centre of Natural Hazards and Disaster Science, Sweden., which focuses on natural hazards, social vulnerability and societal security. He was the appointed Chair of Panta Rhei: Change in Hydrology and Society during 2017–2019, a global decadal initiative of the International Association of Hydrological Sciences (IAHS). Di Baldassarre is also a dedicated educator. He has mentored several postdocs and supervised numerous PhD students at UNESCO-IHE Institute for Water Education in Delft and Uppsala University.

Through his research, Di Baldassarre has contributed to our understanding of the complex feedbacks between hydrological extremes and society, where, among many things, his development of socio-hydrological models on the dynamic two-way feedbacks between hydrological extremes (droughts and floods) and society have provided key process insights into the concepts of adaptation, levee effects and legacy. Since 2020, he has been ranked amongst the most cited scientists in the world for career-long citation impact according to new citation ranking developed by Stanford University and published in the journal PLoS Biology.

== Awards and honors ==
His awards and honors include:

- 2012 - Outstanding Early Career Scientist Award by the European Geosciences Union (EGU)
- 2012 - Early Career Hydrologic Science Award by the American Geophysical Union (AGU)
- 2017 - Consolidator Grant by the European Research Council (ERC)
- 2020 - Thuréus Prize by the Royal Society of Sciences in Uppsala
- 2020 - AGU's Whiterspoon Lecture
- 2021 - EGU's Plinius Medal
- 2025 - International Association of Hydrological Sciences's Volker Medal, International Hydrology Prize

== Notable publications ==
Di Baldassarre's most cited research has been on socio-hydrology, flood risk, natural hazards, and coupled human-nature systems. Here is a selection of some of his most highly cited works:

- Di Baldassarre G, A Montanari (2009), Uncertainty in river discharge observations: a quantitative analysis, Hydrology and Earth System Sciences, 13 (6), 913–921. https://doi.org/10.5194/hess-13-913-2009
- Di Baldassarre G, A Viglione, G Carr, L Kuil, JL Salinas, G Blöschl (2013), Socio-hydrology: conceptualising human-flood interactions, Hydrology and Earth System Sciences, 17 (8), 3295–3303. https://doi.org/10.5194/hess-17-3295-2013
- Di Baldassarre, G., Sivapalan, M., Rusca, M., et al. (2019). Sociohydrology: Scientific challenges in addressing the sustainable development goals. Water Resources Research, 55, 6327–6355. https://doi.org/10.1029/2018WR023901
- Di Baldassarre, G., Nohrstedt, D., Mård, J., et al. (2018). An Integrative Research Framework to Unravel the Interplay of Natural Hazards and Vulnerabilities, Earth's Future, 6, 305–310. https://doi.org/10.1002/2017EF000764
- Mård, J., Di Baldassarre, G., Mazzoleni, M. (2018) Nighttime light data reveal how flood protection shapes human proximity to rivers. Science Advances, 4(8), eaar5779. https://doi.org/10.1126/sciadv.aar5779
- Di Baldassarre, G., Wanders, N., AghaKouchak, A., Kuil, L., Rangecroft, S., Veldkamp, T.I.E., Garcia, M., van Oel, P.R., Breinl, K., and Van Loon A.F. (2018). Water shortages worsened by reservoir effects. Nature Sustainability, 1, 617–622. https://doi.org/10.1038/s41893-018-0159-0
- Di Baldassarre, G., Mazzoleni, M. & Rusca, M. (2021). The legacy of large dams in the United States. Ambio. https://doi.org/10.1007/s13280-021-01533-x.
