= International Association for Hydro-Environment Engineering and Research =

Organization

- Abbreviation: IAHR
- Formation: 1935; 91 years ago
- Type: INGO
- Region served: Worldwide
- Official language: English
- Website: IAHR Official website

The International Association for Hydro-Environment Engineering and Research (IAHR), founded in 1935, is a worldwide, non-profit, independent organisation of engineers and water specialists working in fields related to the hydro-environment and in particular with reference to hydraulics and its practical application. IAHR was called the International Association of Hydraulic Engineering and Research until 2009.

Activities range from river and maritime hydraulics to water resources development, flood risk management and eco-hydraulics, through to ice engineering, hydroinformatics and continuing education and training. IAHR stimulates and promotes both research and its application, and by so doing strives to contribute to sustainable development, the optimisation of world water resources management and industrial flow processes. IAHR accomplishes its goals by a wide variety of member activities including: working groups, research agenda, congresses, specialty conferences, workshops and short courses; Journals, Monographs and Proceedings; by collaborating with international organisations such as UN Water, UNESCO, WMO, IDNDR, GWP, ICSU; and by co-operation with other water-related national and international organisations.

IAHR publishes several international scientific journals in collaboration with Taylor & Francis and Elsevier – the Journal of Hydraulic Research, the Journal of River Basin Management, the Journal of Water Engineering and Research, the Revista Iberoamericana del Agua RIBAGUA jointly with the World Council of Civil Engineers (WCCE), the Journal of Ecohydraulics and theJournal of Hydro-Environment Engineering and Research with the Korean Water Resources Association. It also publishes Hydrolink, a quarterly magazine now FREE ACCESS.

The activities of IAHR are carried out by two full-time professional secretariats with offices in Madrid, Spain, which is hosted by the consortium Spain Water (CEDEX, Direccion General del Agua, Direccion General de Costas, MAPAMA, Spain), and in Beijing, China, hosted by IWHR.

The governing body of the association is a council elected by member ballot every two years. The current president is Prof. Joseph Hun-wei Lee (Hong Kong, China). The current vice-presidents are: Prof. Silke Wieprecht (Germany), Dr. Robert Ettema (USA), and Prof. Hyoseop Woo (South Korea). Dr. Ramon Gutierrez-Serret and Dr. Peng Jing are secretaries general.

IAHR is a Scientific Associate of the International Council for Science (ICSU) and is a partner organisation of UN-Water.

The IAHR World Congress is one of the most important activities of the International Association for Hydro-Environment Engineering and Research (IAHR) which typically attracts between 800 and 1500 participants from around the world. The 2022 IAHR World Congress, under the overall theme "From Snow to Sea", took place in Granada, Spain.

== Publications ==
IAHR publishes the Journal of Hydraulic Research in partnership with Taylor & Francis.

IAHR publishes the International Journal of River Basin Management together with the International Association of Hydrological Sciences and INBO and in partnership with Taylor & Francis.

IAHR publishes the International Journal of Applied Water Engineering and Research together with the World Council of Civil Engineers and in partnership with Taylor & Francis.

The IAHR Asia Pacific Division publishes the Journal of Hydro-Environment Research in collaboration with the KWRA, Korean Water Resources Association and Elsevier

The IAHR Latin America Division publishes the Revista Iberoamericana del Agua in collaboration with the World Council of Civil Engineers (WCCE)
