= Global Water Futures Observatories =

- Abbreviation: GWFO
- Formation: 2023
- Type: Research facility
- Headquarters: University of Saskatchewan, Saskatoon, Canada
- Region served: Canada

Global Water Futures Observatories (GWFO), a Canadian national research facility focused on freshwater security, was established in 2023 to provide continued access to the work produced by instrumented sites and laboratories supported by the nine year long Global Water Futures Program and the more recent Real-time Aquatic Ecosystem Observation Network. GWFO operates national-scale research infrastructure important for understanding, predicting, and managing water-related risk in the face of climate change and growing economic pressures.

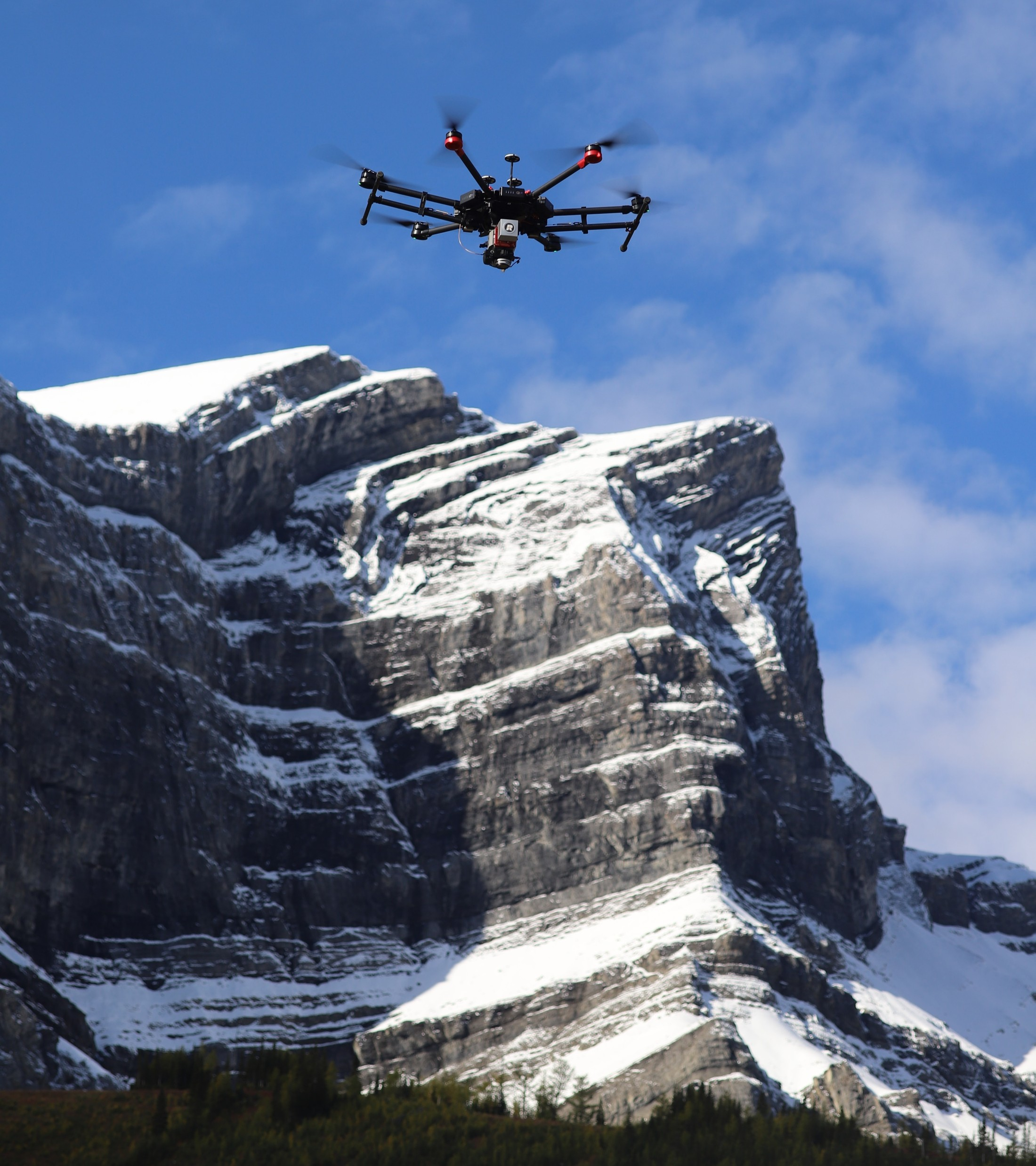
GWFO Smart Water Systems Lab drone flying over Rocky Mountain site in Canada

GWFO is funded by the Canada Foundation for Innovation (CFI) Major Science Initiative (MSI), government grants, user fees and from its nine university partners: University of Saskatchewan, the University of Waterloo, McMaster University, Wilfrid Laurier University, the University of Windsor, Trent University, Carleton University, the University of Western Ontario, and the University of Toronto.

The data collected, managed, quality-controlled and archived through GWFO support development and testing of water prediction models, monitoring of quality changes in water sources, diagnosis of risks to water security, and design of interventions aimed at ensuring long-term sustainability of Canadian water resources. The facility is intended to provide a strategic asset for national water resilience, strengthen community decision-making, and support innovation and global leadership.

GWFO supports collection of data in instrumented water observation sites in lakes, rivers, wetlands, glaciers, and drainage basins across Canada, operation of deployable measurement systems for data acquisition in the field, and laboratories at partner institutions that provide detailed water quality, biological, and other analyses.The data collected, managed, quality-controlled and archived through Global Water Futures Observatories support development and testing of water prediction models, monitoring of quality changes in water sources, diagnosis of risks to water security, and design of interventions aimed at ensuring long-term sustainability of Canadian water resources.

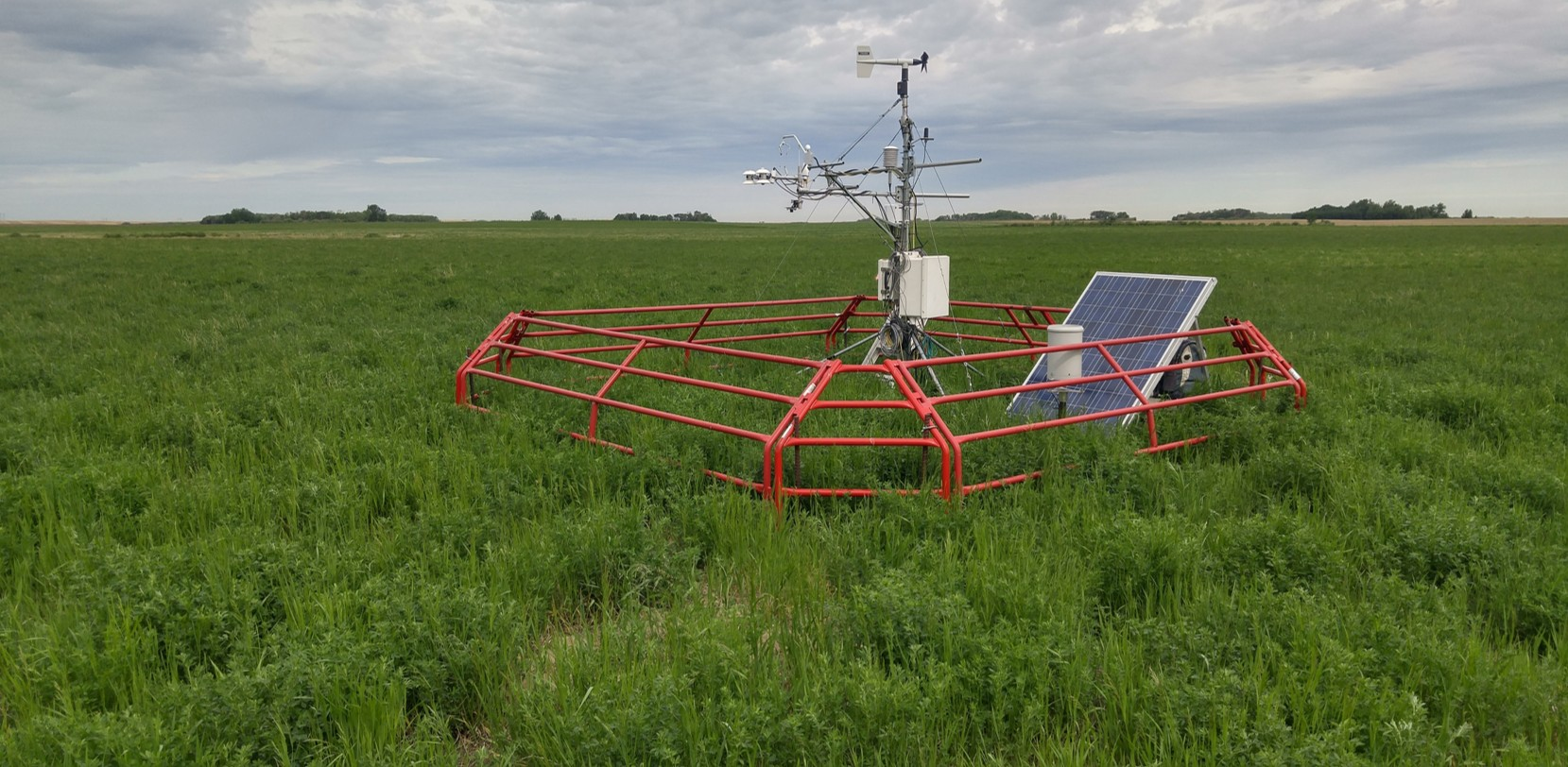
Solar powered data collection instrument in field at GWFO Clavet Livestock and Forage Centre of Excellence

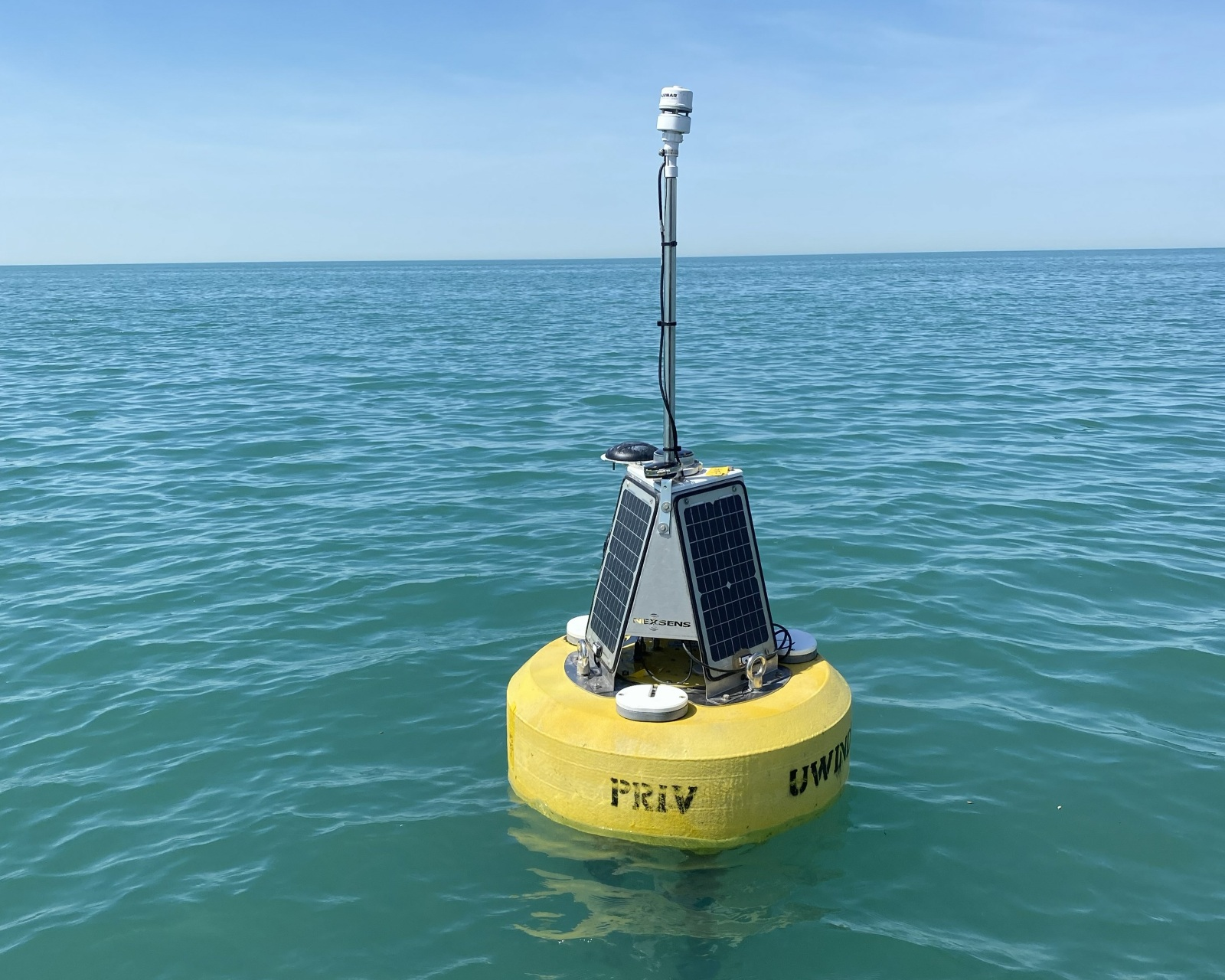
GWFO solar powered instrumented buoy on Lake Erie

The program's operations are coordinated through a secretariat at the University of Saskatchewan, which develops and administers its strategic plan and maintains a portal that provides links to datasets.

GWFO works with organisations such as the International Network of Alpine Research Catchment Hydrology (INARCH), is a Regional Hydroclimate Project of the Global Energy and Water Exchanges Project of the World Climate Programme and contributes to the International Year for Glaciers’ Preservation, the UN Decade of Action for Cryospheric

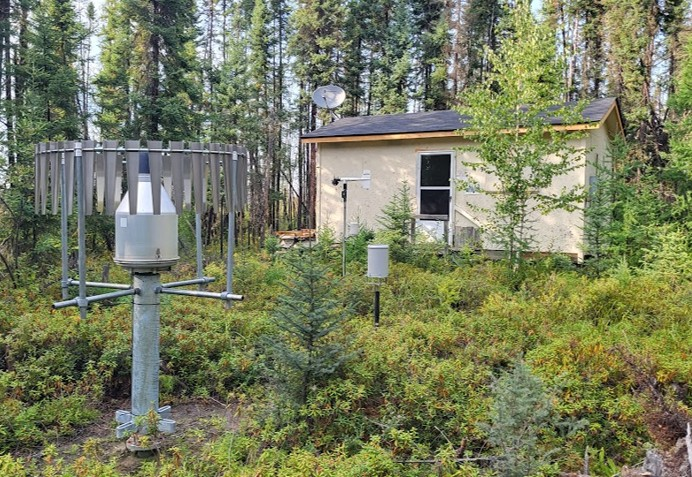
Hut clearing facing Northwest at GWFO BERMS Fen site

Sciences and UNESCO Ecohydrology observation sites.
