= Joseph Lees =

Joseph Lees may refer to:

- Dreaming of Joseph Lees, a 1999 British romantic drama film directed by Eric Styles
- Joseph Lees (writer), author of the 1805 poem in Lancashire dialect Jone o Grinfilt
- Joseph Leese (1845-1914), British cricketer and Member of Parliament
- Joe Lees (1892–1933), English footballer

== See also ==
- Joseph Lee (disambiguation)
