= International Journal of River Basin Management =

- Discipline: Environmental social science
- Language: English

Publication details
- History: 2003–present
- Publisher: Taylor & Francis
- Frequency: Quarterly

Standard abbreviations
- ISO 4: Int. J. River Basin Manag.

Indexing
- ISSN: 1571-5124 (print); 1814-2060 (web)

Links
- Journal homepage

International Journal of River Basin Management is a quarterly academic journal issued for the first time during the Third World Water Forum in Kyoto, March 2003. It is published in print and electronic format by Taylor & Francis, on behalf of the International Association of Hydraulic Engineering and Research, the International Association of Hydrological Sciences and the International Network of Basin Organizations.

== Abstracting and indexing ==
- Academic Search Complete
- GeoRef
- TOC Premier
- GEOBASE (Elsevier)
- Scopus
- GeoRef
