= Cold Regions Hydrological Modelling platform =

The Cold Regions Hydrological Modelling (CRHM) Platform is a hydrological modelling program incorporating the seminal works of Don Gray, Raoul Granger, Pat Landine, and John Pomeroy, among others, in representing hydrological processes for small to mid-sized catchments in cold regions of the earth. Code and software development was carried out by University of Saskatchewan engineer, Tom Brown. Used extensively and supported by the University of Saskatchewan's Centre for Hydrology, CRHM has also been used in 57 Canadian and 31 organizations worldwide to build basin hydrology models. In Canada, the platform has been used to support hydrological predictions related to glacier and snow melt in the Canadian Rocky Mountains and western provinces. CRHM includes following components: Basin, Observation, Snow Transport, Interception, Radiation, Evaporation, Snowmelt, Infiltration, Soil Moisture Balance, Wetlands, Flow, Gravitational Snow Transport, Glacier Melt, and Freezing and Thawing Fronts Dynamics.

== Operation ==
CRHM requires files (extension .obs) of high-frequency (preferably hourly) continuous time series of observed air temperature, wind speed, humidity, and precipitation. The R package CRHMr can be used to prepare these time series, including infilling missing values. CRHMr can also be used to post-process and plot CRHM outputs.

Other packages that can be used to acquire data for use by CRHM include MSCr which uses data from Meteorological Service of Canada files, Reanalysis, which creates .obs files from several types of reanalysis files, including ERA, WATCH and NARR, and WISKIr, which uses data from a Wiski web server.

== Research supported by CRHM ==
CRHM has been used extensively in snow modelling and studies of the effects of climate change on cold regions headwater basins. Results from use of the model have also been used in studies of agricultural practices, changes in glaciers, grasslands, and boreal forests.
