= Joseph Hun-wei Lee =

Civil engineering professor

李行偉 Joseph Hun-wei Lee

Macau University of Science and Technology President (2021-2025) International Association for Hydro-Environment Engineering and Research（IAHR）President (2019-2023)

Personal details
- Education: Massachusetts Institute of Technology (BS, SM, PhD)

Joseph Hun-wei Lee (Chinese: 李行偉) is a Chinese civil engineer who served as President of the Macau University of Science and Technology from 2021 to 2025.

== Education and career ==
Lee received a BSc, a MSc, and a PhD in civil engineering from the Massachusetts Institute of Technology. He served as president of the International Association for Hydro-Environment Engineering and Research (IAHR) from 2019 to 2023, the first Chinese to head the IAHR in its over eight decades of history. He is a past President of the Hong Kong Academy of Engineering Sciences (HKAES), past Chairman of Hong Kong Research Grant Council (RGC) as well as the Assessment Panel of the Hong Kong Public Policy Research Scheme. He was the founding editor-in-chief of the Journal of Hydro-environment Research (JHER).

He joined the faculty of the University of Delaware as an assistant professor, and moved to the University of Hong Kong in 1980. At the University of Hong Kong, he was dean of engineering from 2000 to 2003, and pro-vice-chancellor and vice-president (staffing) from 2004 to 2010. During 2010-2016, he took office as vice-president for research and graduate studies at Hong Kong University of Science and Technology.

== Research ==
Joseph Lee's research is about the use of hydraulics in application to environmental problems, specifically the theory of buoyant jets and its environmental applications, eco-hydraulics related to dynamics of algal blooms and red tides, AI and real time water quality forecasting systems and urban flood control for climate change. He is also the director of the Croucher Laboratory of Environmental Hydraulics since 2004.

He developed the theoretical modelling and engineering prediction of the mixing and dilution of turbulent buoyant jets in an ambient current and proposed the Lagrangian integral jet model - JETLAG, a general tool that enables the first engineering prediction of the 3D trajectory and the initial dilution of an arbitrarily inclined buoyant jet in stratified ambient current. The method forms the basis of the VISJET modelling system that is widely used internationally for impact assessment and outfall design. His work on buoyant jet theory has also been applied to unravel the transmission and spreading mechanisms of the Severe Acute Respiratory Syndrome (SARS) in Hong Kong in 2003.

Professor Lee led the development of early warning system of Harmful Algal Blooms (HAB) and helped advance smart environmental management for water resilience. In 2008 he proposed Project WATERMAN – a real-time coastal water quality forecast and management system. The system has been adopted for environmental impact assessment, emergency response, and daily beach water quality forecasting and scientific management of marine fish culture by the Hong Kong Government.

He served as consultant on major hydro-environmental projects, contributing to the Hong Kong Harbour Area Treatment Scheme, Yuen Long Bypass Floodway and Tai Hang Tung Storage Scheme. His theory on supercritical vortex intakes has been adopted in the design of Hong Kong West Drainage Tunnel and urban drainage infrastructures in other cities such as the Thames Tideway Tunnel in London.

As independent expert appointed by the Hong Kong SAR Government, he has also helped resolve complex high profile public investigations of environmental episodes of social importance – including the “Excess lead in drinking water of public housing” in 2015, the mysterious disastrous Tai Po River debris flooding in 2010, and the Environmental Impact Assessment Appeal (EIA) of a railway line through the Long Valley Wetland EIA in 2001. He also led a CAE-HKAES study which assisted the national policy of developing the Guangdong-Hong Kong-Macau Greater Bay Area into an international innovation and technology hub.

== Honors and awards ==
- Prince Sultan bin Abdulaziz International Prize for Water: Water Management & Protection, 2024
- 2023 Honorary Fellow, The Hong Kong Institution of Engineers
- 2002 Fellow, Hong Kong Academy of Engineering Sciences
- 2008 Fellow, Royal Academy of Engineering, United Kingdom
- China State Scientific and Technological Progress Award (First and Principal Investigator, 2010, Second Class)
- ASCE Hunter Rouse Hydraulic Engineering Award (2009)
- Honorary Membership, International Association for Hydro-environment Engineering and Research (IAHR) (2015)
- Senior Research Fellowship Award of the Croucher Foundation (1998)
- Croucher Laboratory of Environmental Hydraulics (2004)
- Karl Emil Hilgard Hydraulic Prize of the American Society of Civil Engineers (ASCE) (2013)
- Distinguished IAHR-APD Membership Award (2010)
- Alexander von Humboldt Research Fellow, University of Karlsruhe, Germany (1992-1993)
- Innovation Award (Sustainability), the Hong Kong Construction Industry Council (2017)
- Innovation Award for Construction Industry of the Hong Kong Institution of Engineers (2002)
- Dai Yu Science & Technology Medal of Chinese Hydraulic Engineering Society (Second class) (2018)
