= Global Water Futures Program =

Canadian scientific research program

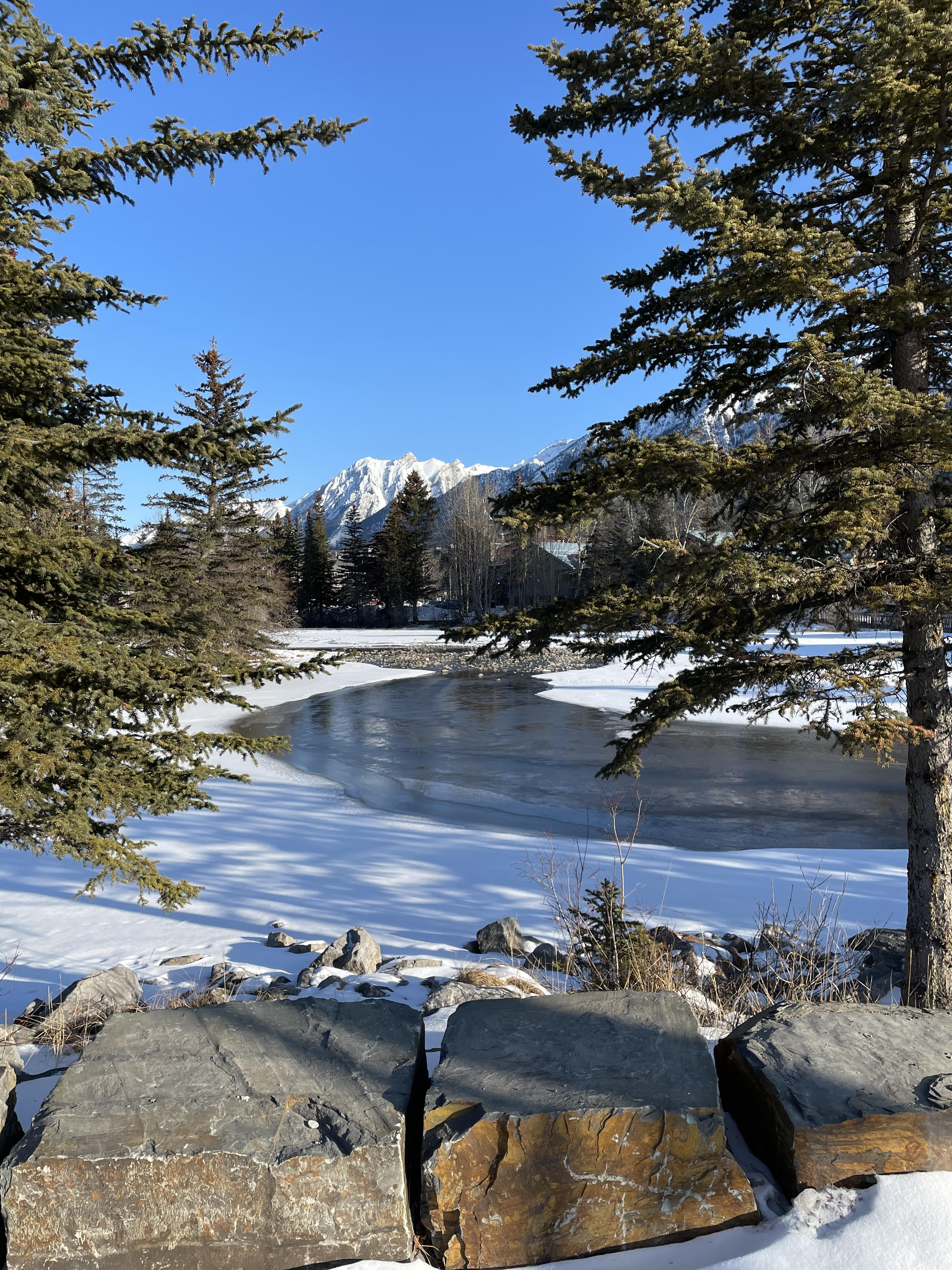
Bow River from bridge in Canmore village, Alberta, March 2023

Global Water Futures was a networked Canadian scientific research program, supported in large part by the Canada First Research Excellence Fund. The program's design and foundational data management were informed by several predecessor Canadian research programs including the Mackenzie GEWEX study (MAGS) and the Changing Cold Regions Network and were influenced by increasing awareness of climate change and development threats to Canadian water supplies and quality.

The program, designed to improve disaster warning, to predict water quantity and quality, and to develop risk management tools for water planners and managers, was set up in 2016 at the University of Saskatchewan Global Institute for Water Security with three main university partners: the University of Waterloo, Wilfrid Laurier University, and McMaster University.

Program activities were clustered under three categories:

- identifying and predicting change in cold regions,
- developing big data and decision support systems, and
- designing user solutions.

The program's geographic coverage included important river basins and ecological, climatological, and physiographic regions. Under the Global Institute for Water Security, Global Water Futures committed to supporting the United Nations Sustainable Development Goals. The program was intended to run for seven years: interruptions caused by the COVID-19 pandemic allowed for some extensions until 2025, when the funded prgramme officially ended.

Budget

The budget of CAD 77.84 million from the Canada First Research Excellence Fund, was supplemented by CAD 223.15 million in cash and in-kind contributions, including historical data sets from collaborating research institutions, and other federal government funding. Approximate budget allocations for each of the program categories were:

- identifying and predicting change in cold regions: 40%
- developing big data and decision support systems: 45%
- designing user solutions: 15%.

The program set out to facilitate co-production of knowledge with practitioners and other knowledge users, and to apply transdisciplinary approaches. In January 2019, recognizing the significant role that water plays in Canadian Indigenous culture and communities, the program announced funding for six Indigenous co-led projects to focus on water-related issues. Complementary to these projects was organization of a meeting in 2023 at Mistawasis Nêhiyawak, Saskatchewan of Indigenous representatives from across Canada who developed a statement and protocol that called for better co-production of water knowledge.

Outcomes

The program developed 64 projects and core teams, supported operation of 76 scientific observatories and research stations, and has trained 552 student researchers. These involved collaboration with international partners, especially in mountain hydrology. The program's work in computational hydrology is especially recognized for its work on models that are applicable internationally. Standards for data management and a common catalogue were developed to preserve access to datasets produced by individual projects.

Global Water Futures also helped to inform development of the Canada Water Agency, a new federal institution intended to address fragmentation of water management in Canada.

Outputs from Global Water Futures findings include peer-reviewed journal articles, conference papers, datasets, and predictive models and tools related to climate that are being applied both within and outside of Canada. Six annual open science meetings allowed dissemination and discussion of the program work with academic researchers and practitioners. A special project partnered scientists with artists to create paintings and other art that reflected the themes of the Global Water Futures program.

Also of note was adaptation in 2020 of the project, Next generation solutions to ensure healthy water resources for future generations, to provide Covid-19 wastewater surveillance results to major Saskatchewan urban centres, work that continued into 2023.

Global Water Futures Observatories

In 2023, through the Canada Foundation for Innovation (CFI) Major Science Initiatives (MSI) program, the Government of Canada approved funding support for Global Water Futures Observatories to maintain until 2029 the observatories, research facilities, and data management systems developed and supported by the program.

== See also ==
- List of rivers of Canada
- List of lakes of Canada
