= Canada Foundation for Innovation =

- Fondation canadienne pour l'innovation
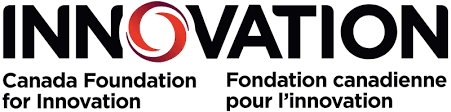
- Formation: April 25, 1997; 29 years ago
- Type: Independent corporation created by the Government of Canada
- Headquarters: 55 Metcalfe Street Ottawa, Ontario K1P 6L5 Canada
- President and CEO: Sylvain Charbonneau
- Budget: CA$ 990 million (2023)
- Staff: 100 (estimate)
- Website: www.innovation.ca

The Canada Foundation for Innovation (CFI; French: Fondation canadienne pour l'innovation, FCI) is an independent corporation created by the Government of Canada to invest in research facilities and equipment in Canada's universities, colleges, research hospitals, and non-profit research institutions.

The CFI does not report staff numbers on its website or in its annual reports. Based on the professional network site Linkedin, the number is approximately 100 (for 2025).

== History ==
The CFI was created by the Government of Canada through the Budget Implementation Act 1997, Bill C-93, to "help build and sustain a research landscape in Canada that will attract and retain the world's top talent, train the next generation of researchers, support private-sector innovation and create high-quality jobs that strengthen Canada's position in today's knowledge economy".

In 2023 it released its current 5-year Strategic Plan which states four key objectives:

- Increase Canada's capacity for world-class scientific research and technology development
- Support economic growth, job creation, health and environmental quality through innovation
- Expand research and job opportunities for the next generation
- Promote productive networks and collaboration

=== Presidents ===
- Keith Brimacombe (First President and CEO, named in June 1997)
- David Strangway (1998-2004)
- Eliot Phillipson (2004-2010)
- Gilles G. Patry (2010-2017)
- Roseann O'Reilly Runte (2017-2024)
- Sylvain Charbonneau (current as of October 1, 2024)

== Governance ==
The CFI was established as an independent corporation with a board of directors, which meets three to four times a year. The board of directors reports to Members—a higher governing body similar to a company's shareholders but representing the Canadian public. Members are nominated and appointed for a five-year term. An annual public meeting is held each year.

== Funding ==
The infrastructure funded by the CFI includes the equipment, laboratories, databases, specimens, scientific collections, computer hardware and software, communications linkages and buildings necessary to conduct research.

The CFI has established a merit-review process that relies on experts from across Canada and around the world to ensure that only the best projects receive funding. CFI funding is awarded to institutions, not individual researchers, and all funding proposals must support an institution's strategic research plan. Eligible Canadian institutions apply to the CFI through a suite of funds, and all applications are assessed using three broad criteria: quality of the research and its need for infrastructure, contribution to strengthening the capacity for innovation and potential benefits of the research to Canada.

The CFI funds up to 40 percent of a project's research infrastructure costs. This funding is then leveraged to attract the remaining investment from partners in the public, private and non-profit sectors.

== Major research facilities ==
Major Science Initiatives (MSI) funded in 2023 (next competition is expected to launch in 2027). Below are the top awards (over CA$ 30M), ordered by size descending:

- Ocean Networks Canada - Ocean observing facility hosted at the University of Victoria, British Columbia
- SNOLAB - Canadian underground science laboratory located in Sudbury, Ontario, funds to Queens University, Ontario
- Canadian Light Source Synchrotron - Canada's national synchrotron located at the University of Saskatchewan in Saskatoon, Saskatchewan
- CCGS Amundsen - Icebreaker and Arctic research vessel, funds to the Université Laval, Québec
- CGEn - Canada's national facility for genome sequencing and analysis with admin headquarters in Toronto, Ontario
- Vaccine and Infectious Disease Organization - Research organization of the University of Saskatchewan
- Ocean Tracking Network - Global network to study fish migration hosted at Dalhousie University, Nova Scotia
- Global Water Futures Observatories - National freshwater research facility that supports critical water research, hosted at the University of Saskatchewan

== Criticism ==
CFI has been criticized for being redundant and part of a "convoluted" federal funding apparatus.

== See also ==
- Natural Sciences and Engineering Research Council (NSERC)
- Canadian Institutes for Health Research (CIHR)
- Social Sciences and Humanities Research Council (SSHRC)
