= Sabesan Sithamparanathan =

British academic (born 1984)

Sabesan Sithamparanathan OBE FREng FIET
- Born: S. Sabesan; 1984 (age 41–42); Jaffna, Sri Lanka
- Education: University of Sheffield; Corpus Christi College, Cambridge
- Occupation: Academic

Sabesan Sithamparanathan (Tamil: சபேசன் சிதம்பரநாதன்; born 1984) is a British engineer, academic, Fellow of the Royal Academy of Engineering and Fellow of the Institution of Engineering and Technology. He is a co-founder and president of PervasID, a company specialising in radio-frequency identification (RFID) technology. He is credited with developing the world’s most accurate battery-free RFID tracking system.

== Early life ==
Sithamparanathan was born in 1984 in Jaffna, Sri Lanka. He is a native of Chavakachcheri and was educated at Chavakachcheri Hindu College and Jaffna Hindu College. He studied for a few months at the University of Moratuwa's Faculty of Engineering before receiving a scholarship to study electronic engineering at the University of Sheffield in 2004. In 2006, he was awarded the Sir William Siemens Medal, which is awarded to the UK's top 18 science and technology students. He received a B.Eng. (hons) degree from Sheffield in 2007. He received a M.Phil. degree in electronic engineering from Corpus Christi College, Cambridge in 2008.

== Career ==
Sithamparanathan worked at ARM Ltd, a University of Cambridge spin-off company, as a student IP electronic engineer. He started studying for his doctorate at Corpus Christi in 2008 under the supervision of Ian H. White and in 2011 received a Ph.D. degree for his "A Passive RFID Real Time Sensing System for Intelligent Infrastructure" thesis. He was elected as Tucker-Price Junior Research Fellow in Science at Girton College, Cambridge in 2011. He was elected enterprise fellow at Girton in 2022.

Sithamparanathan owns a number of patents and is credited with developing the world’s most accurate battery-free radio-frequency identification (RFID) tracking solution. During his Ph.D. studies, he developed a RFID location tracking system that uses electromagnetic fields to locate and identify tags attached to various objects. The tags had a 99% accuracy within a 20m range, compared to an industry average of 80% accuracy within a 2m range. Sithamparanathan is a co-founder an president of PervasID, a University of Cambridge spin-off company established in 2011 to commercialise his RFID research. The company operates in multiple sectors globally, including retail, healthcare, industrial, logistics and supply chain.

In 2011, Sithamparanathan won the Connected World category at the Engineering and Physical Sciences Research Council's ICT Pioneers Competition and the Royal Academy of Engineering ERA Entrepreneurs Award. He was chairman of the Institution of Engineering and Technology's Cambridge Younger Professionals Committee and is a Fellow of the Institution of Engineering and Technology. He was awarded the Royal Academy of Engineering (RAEng)'s enterprise fellowship in 2014 and the Sir George Macfarlane Medal in 2016. PervasID received the Queen’s Award for Enterprise award in the innovation class in 2021. Sithamparanathan received the RAEng's silver medal in 2021 and was elected Fellow of the Royal Academy of Engineering in 2023. He was also named in Business Elite’s “40 Under 40” in 2023. He was appointed an Officer of the Order of the British Empire (OBE) in the 2024 New Year Honours for services to innovation technology and the promotion of STEM subjects in education.

Sithamparanathan was captain of the Corpus Christi College MCR cricket team and president of University of Cambridge Graduate Cricket League.
