= International Association of Hydrological Sciences =

- Abbreviation: IAHS
- Formation: 1922
- Type: INGO
- Headquarters: Wallingford, Oxfordshire, UK
- Location: United Kingdom
- Region served: Worldwide
- Members: over 12,000
- President: Salvatore Grimaldi
- Parent organization: International Union of Geodesy and Geophysics
- Staff: 4 (2020)
- Website: iahs.info

The International Association of Hydrological Sciences (IAHS) is a non-profit, non-governmental scientific organization committed to serving the science of hydrology and the worldwide community of hydrologists. The IAHS was established in 1922, and presently claims a membership in excess of 12,000 with members in over 170 countries.

Ten international scientific commissions deal with the hydrological cycle, water resources, and specific techniques. Other working groups and initiatives address particular issues.

== Governance ==
IAHS is one of the eight associations that comprise the International Union of Geodesy and Geophysics. In accordance with the IAHS statutes and by-laws, the IAHS officers and commissioners are elected every four years by national representatives at the IAHS plenary during the IUGG General Assembly

== National representation ==
Official contact between the IAHS and member countries is made via the national representative in each country, who acts as a focal point and channel for communication. If there is a national IUGG committee (usually appointed by the national academy of sciences or equivalent), the IAHS representative is nominated by it or its IUGG subcommittee. Member countries may also appoint national correspondents for the commissions.

== Publications ==
IAHS Press fulfills the IAHS mission of worldwide dissemination of research results and practice, and raises funds by publishing and selling the Hydrological Sciences Journal and three book series: the Red Book series, Special Publications (Blue Books), and the Benchmark series. Since 2014, the Red Book series has been published online with open access by Copernicus Publications as the Proceedings of the International Association of Hydrological Sciences (PIAHS). The IAHS electronic news is distributed free to the members.

== Finance ==
IAHS is a UK registered charity; all revenues are used to support the aims of the association. The greater part of IAHS’ funding is raised through the publication of the Hydrological Sciences Journal.

IAHS works closely with IUGG, International Council for Science (ICSU), UNESCO, World Meteorological Organization (WMO), International Atomic Energy Agency (IAEA) and WWC, and often collaborates with organisations such as the International Association of Hydrogeologists (IAH), International Association of Hydraulic Engineering and Research (IAHR) and the Inland Waterways Association (IWA).

== Hydrological decades ==
IAHS supports decades of hydrological research that aim to encourage hydrological research around the globe under a common theme.

=== Predictions in Ungauged Basins ===
The Predictions in Ungauged Basins (PUB) scientific decade lasted from 2003 to 2012. It was described as the "first scientific endeavor to track and quantify the world's water supply". Results from the PUB decade benefited other scientific initiatives, such as HEPEX.

=== Panta Rhei: change in hydrology and society ===
The Panta Rhei scientific decade ran from 2013–2022. The name 'Panta Rhei' means "Everything Flows." The Panta Rhei decade focuses on scientific understanding, prediction, and water management in rapidly changing environmental systems, with an explicit focus on the role of humans in the water cycle. The theme and name of the Panta Rhei decade were identified through community discussion, and Panta Rhei was launched in 2013. During the first Panta Rhei biennium, 2013–2015, 31 working groups were formed on diverse topics related to hydrology, society, and change. Panta Rhei shared some common aims with the UNESCO International Hydrological Programme (IHP) Phase VIII on Water Security.

== Awards ==
The International Hydrology prize -- the Dooge medal and Volker Medal -- is awarded annually by IAHS, with UNESCO and the World Meteorological Organization, to two people who have made significant contributions to hydrological science.

The 2025 Dooge medal -- named after James Clement Dooge -- has been awarded to Professor John Pomeroy of the University of Saskatchewan and Global Water Futures for "... critical advancements to improve our understanding of climate warming as well as the cryosphere, hydrological processes, and hydrological predictions in cold regions and ungauged basins around the world." The 2025 Volker medal -- named after Adriaan Volker-- has been awarded to Professor Giuliano Di Baldassarre, at the Uppsala University Department of Earth Sciences, in Sweden, for "... outstanding original contributions, which have significantly benefited society by addressing critical issues of public interest and development, such as coupled human-flood and human-drought interactions."
