= Katerina Spranger =

Female engineer and CEO of Oxford Heartbeat

- Born: Ukraine
- Education: Humboldt University of Berlin; Oxford University
- Known for: CEO of Oxford Heartbeat
- Awards: Princess Royal Silver Medal; Innovate UK - Women in Innovation Award
- Scientific career
- Thesis: Computational modelling of vascular interventions: endovascular device deployment (2014)
- Doctoral advisor: Professor Yiannis Ventikos
- Website: Oxford Heartbeat

Katerina Spranger is a biomedical engineer, and the founder and CEO of Oxford Heartbeat, a medical software start-up that uses AI to increase the safety and accuracy of brain implant surgical interventions.

== Early life and education ==
Spranger grew up in Odesa, on the Black Sea, in the south of Ukraine. She completed her BSc and MSc in computer science in 2009, at Humboldt University of Berlin, specialising in AI & Robotics with a minor in Business. Spranger then worked for the Sony Computer Science Laboratory in Paris, before deciding to pursue a career in healthcare. She completed her DPhil in Biomedical Engineering at Oxford University in 2014, under the supervision of Professor Yiannis Ventikos. In 2013, whilst still working on her DPhil, Spranger presented the idea behind Oxford Heartbeat at the annual Falling Walls Conference on Future Breakthroughs in Science and Society in Berlin and won the title "Young Innovator of the Year".

== Career and impact ==
Upon completing her DPhil, Spranger founded the company Oxford Heartbeat in 2015. The medical device software company aims to bring life-saving technology into clinical practice and to offer every patient the highest standards of care.

In 2017, Spranger was awarded the Royal Academy of Engineering Fellowship. With their backing and support, alongside grants from Innovate UK, the company developed their first product, PreSize Neurovascular: an AI-powered software that support clinicians in planning and performing neurovascular surgeries with implant devices. This software's predictions proved both accurate and reliable, highlighting its potential in improving the standard of practice. In 2018, Oxford Heartbeat company was named "Best UK Healthcare startup" 2018 by WIRED magazine. In 2020, the company won the NHS AI in Health and Care Award, which funded the testing of PreSize Neurovascular across nine different hospitals in the UK.

== Awards ==
In 2024, Spranger was awarded a Princess Royal Silver Medal by the Royal Academy of Engineering. The award recognizes outstanding individual contributions of junior engineers that result in successful market exploitation. In the same year, Spranger was honoured with a Purple Plaque in recognition of her prestigious Innovate UK - Women in Innovation Award. The Purple Plaque is displayed at the Department of Engineering Science at Oxford University.

Spranger was included in the 2023 'Engineering Icons' tube map, a joint initiative by Transport for London and the Royal Academy of Engineering to honour the contributions of engineers in London, the UK and worldwide. Spranger was named "Young Innovator of the Year 2013" at the Falling Walls Berlin - International Conference on Future Breakthrough in Science and Society.
