= International Network of Basin Organizations =

INBO logo

The International Network of Basin Organizations (INBO) (French: Réseau International des Organismes de Bassin RIOB). It was established in 1994 and its headquarters is in Paris.

Its objective is to promote the exchange of experiences between organizations in charge of river basin management in such areas as institutional and financial management, knowledge of water resources, training different stakeholders involved in water management as well as the staff of basin organizations, and increasing the awareness of the general public for water resources management. It also promotes the twinning of basin organizations from different countries, including the exchange of staff. INBO and its member organizations support the application of Integrated water resources management

As of 2000 INBO included 134 members or observers. Some countries are represented by a government Ministry, whether these countries have established river basin organizations (such as Morocco) or not (such as India). Other countries, notably France and Spain which both have a long tradition of well-established river basin organizations (see fr:Agence de l'eau and es:Confederación hidrográfica), are represented both at the Ministerial level and by river basin organizations. Algeria, Brazil and Mexico, which have all established river basin organizations during the 1990s, are represented both by institutions at the national and at the basin level. As of 2000 INBO had no members from China, Egypt, Germany, Nigeria, South Africa, Turkey or the United States, countries which have no or few river basin organizations. INBO includes transboundary basin agencies, such as the Organisation pour la mise en valeur du fleuve Sénégal (OMVS). It also includes several international organizations and partnerships, such as UNEP, UNDP and the Global Water Partnership, as well as regional organization such as the Southern African Development Community (SADC).

There are regional networks within INBO. They cover Eastern and Central Europe (CEENBO, created in 2001), Sub-Saharan Africa (ANBO, created in 2002), the Mediterranean (MENBO, created in 2003), Asia (NARBO, created in 2004), Latin America (LANBO, created in 2008) and North America (NANBO, created in 2009).
