= IAMG Distinguished Lectureship =

The IAMG Distinguished Lectureship is a special lecture series established in the year 2002 by the International Association for Mathematical Geosciences (IAMG). Each year IAMG selects IAMG Distinguished Lecturer, who is an outstanding individual with (i) demonstrated ability to communicate mathematical concepts to general geological audience, (ii) a clear enthusiasm for mathematical geology, (iii) recognition fork in their field, and (iv) established skill in working with individuals and in group discussions on geological problems. The selected IAMG Distinguished Lecturer must be ready to travel and to (i) Prepare and present a lecture suitable for a general geological audience, (ii) Prepare and present one or two lectures on a more specialized topic, and Interact and hold discussions with individuals, both professionals and students, on applications of mathematical geology to local problems of interest.

== Lecturers ==
- 2002 John C. Davis
- 2004 Frederick P. Agterberg
- 2005 Larry Drew
- 2006 Larry W. Lake
- 2007 Vera Pawlowsky-Glahn
- 2008 Donald Myers
- 2009–2010 Roussos Dimitrakopoulos
- 2011–2012 Amilcar Soares
- 2012 Jack Schuenemeyer
- 2013 Pierre Goovaerts
- 2014 Eric Grunsky
- 2015 Gordon M. Kaufman
- 2016 Sean McKenna
- 2017 Clayton V. Deutsch
- 2018 Gregoire Mariethoz
- 2019 Philippe Renard
- 2020 Peter Atkinson
- 2021 J. Jaime Gómez-Hernández
- 2022 Qiuming Cheng
- 2023 Jennifer McKinley
- 2924 Michael Pyrcz
- 2025 Jeff Boisvert
- 2026 Renguang Zuo

== See also ==
- Georges Matheron Lectureship
- Bullerwell Lecture
- List of geology awards
- List of geophysics awards
- List of mathematics awards
