= B. S. Daya Sagar =

Indian specialist in mathematical morphology

B. S. Daya Sagar బి. ఎస్. దయా సాగర్
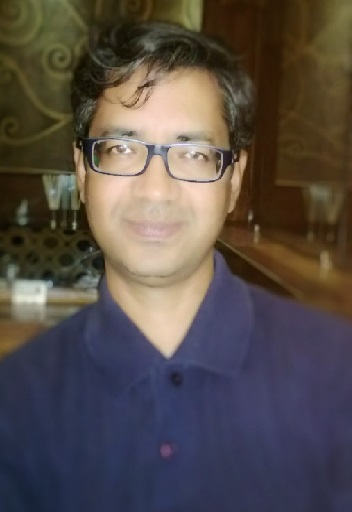
- Sagar in 2014.
- Born: 1967 (age 58–59); India
- Education: Andhra University College of Engineering
- Occupation: Academic / Scientist
- Awards: Georges Matheron Lectureship Award (2011); Krishnan Medal (2002); IAMG Certificate of Appreciation (2018); IEEE Geoscience and Remote Sensing Society Distinguished Lecturer (2020-24); Fellow of the Indian Academy of Sciences (2022); Fellow of the Indian National Science Academy (2024); Fellow of the International Artificial Intelligence Industry Alliance (2024)
- Scientific career
- Fields: Mathematical morphology Mathematical geosciences Fractals; Geographical information science
- Workplaces: Indian Statistical Institute-Bangalore Centre; Multimedia University; National University of Singapore; Andhra University College of Engineering
- Doctoral advisors: B. S. Prakasa Rao and SVLN Rao
- Website: http://www.isibang.ac.in/~bsdsagar

Behara Seshadri Daya Sagar FASc, FNA, FIGU, FRGS also known as B. S. Daya Sagar (born in 1967 in India) is an Indian mathematical geoscientist specializing in mathematical morphology. He is a professor of computer science at the Indian Statistical Institute, Bangalore. He is known as a specialist in mathematical morphology, fractal geometry, chaos theory, and their applications in geophysics, geographical information science, and computational geography. In 2002, the Indian Geophysical Union awarded him the Krishnan Medal. In 2011, he became the first Asian to receive the Georges Matheron Lectureship. In 2018, he received the IAMG Certificate of Appreciation by the International Association for Mathematical Geosciences for his work on the Handbook of Mathematical Geosciences. In 2020, Sagar was selected as an IEEE Distinguished Lecturer (DL) to represent the IEEE Geoscience and Remote Sensing Society. He, with Frits Agterberg, Qiuming Cheng, and Jennifer McKinley, led the monumental project on the Encyclopedia of Mathematical Geosciences to the completion. The first edition of two-volume 1756-page Encyclopedia of Mathematical Geosciences was published on 21 June 2023 by Springer International Publishers.

== Education ==
Sagar was educated at St. Anthony's School, Visakhapatnam, Government High School-Samalkota, and Government Arts College-Srikakulam, India. He graduated with BSc in 1987 from Shree Durga Prasad Saraf College of Arts and Applied Sciences, Sriramnagar, an affiliated college of Andhra University. Subsequently, he received MSc and PhD degrees from the Andhra University College of Engineering-Visakhapatnam, India, in 1991 and 1994 respectively. His PhD thesis is on 'Applications of Remote Sensing, Mathematical Morphology, and Fractals to Study Certain Surface Water Bodies'.

== Career ==
After receiving his doctorate, Sagar worked at the Andhra University College of Engineering as a research associate (1994–95 and 1998–98) of CSIR, and as a research scientist/principal investigator (1997–7) in the Scheme for Extramural Research for Young Scientists funded by the Ministry of Science and Technology. From 1998 to 2001, he worked as a research scientist at the Centre for Remote Imaging Sensing and Processing (CRISP) of the National University of Singapore. He was appointed as an associate professor of the Faculty of Engineering and Technology, Multimedia University (MMU), Malaysia, in 2001 and was also a deputy chairman of the Centre for Applied Electromagnetics (2003–07) there. Between 2007 and 2013, he was an associate professor at the Indian Statistical Institute-Bangalore centre, and since 2009, he has been acting as founding head of SSIU–a unit established in 2009 as a constituent unit of its Computer and Communication Sciences Division. Since 2013, he has been a professor, and currently a professor of higher administrative grade at the Indian Statistical Institute. In April 2023, he took the charge as Head of the Indian Statistical Institute-Bangalore Centre.

== Research ==
Sagar's research contributions span both basic and applied fields, and involves the fusion of computer simulations and modeling techniques in order to develop cogent models in discrete space to gain an understanding of dynamical behavior of complex terrestrial systems, such as water bodies, river networks, mountain objects, folds, dunes, landscapes, and rock porous media. He developed specific technologies and spatial algorithms for using data acquired at multiple spatial and temporal scales for developing cogent domain-specific models. His work employs concepts stemmed out of recent theories—such as mathematical morphology, fractals, chaos, and morphometrics—to develop spatial algorithms for (i) pattern retrieval, (ii) pattern analysis, (iii) simulation and modeling, and (iv) reasoning and visualization of the spatial and temporal phenomena of terrestrial and GISci relevance. His studies show that there exist several open challenges that need to be addressed by mathematical geosciences community. One of such challenges is to understand the complexity in spatiotemporal behaviors of several terrestrial phenomena and processes via construction of process-specific attractors that may range from simple to strange.

== Professional ==
Sagar has been honored with the Georges Matheron Lectureship Award of International Association for Mathematical Geosciences for outstanding research ability in the field of spatial statistics or mathematical morphology. In 2002, he received Krishnan Medal of the Indian Geophysical Union. As recipient of this medal, Sagar was made IGU Fellow in 2011. In 1995, he received Dr. Balakrishna Memorial Award from the Regional Centre of Andhra Pradesh Akademi of Sciences. He is an elected Fellow of Royal Geographical Society (1999), Fellow of Indian Geophysical Union (2011), Senior Member of IEEE (2003) and was a member of New York Academy of Science during 1995–96. In 2022, Sagar was elected as a fellow by the Indian Academy of Sciences. He is on the Editorial Boards of Discrete Dynamics of Nature and Society, and Computers & Geosciences. He has published more than 80 papers in peer-reviewed international journals, three books, and seven edited Special-Theme issues for well known journals. He has been on Editorial Boards of Computers & Geosciences, Mathematical Geosciences, and Discrete Dynamics in Nature & Society.

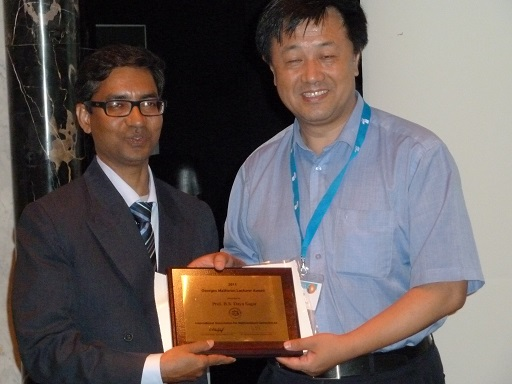
Sagar receiving the Georges Matheron Lectureship Award-2011 of International Association for Mathematical Geosciences from Qiuming Cheng in Salzburg, Austria on 7 September 2011

=== Professional activities ===
- Editor of Discrete Dynamics in Nature and Society: Multidisciplinary Research and Review Journal
- Editorial Board Member, Computers & Geosciences
- Editorial Board Member, Mathematical Geosciences
- Review Editor of Environmental Informatics-Frontiers (Frontiers Media)
- Associate Editor of Image Analysis & Stereology
- Founding Chairman, Bangalore Section IEEE GRSS Chapter

== Honors and awards ==
- Member, Honors & Recognition Committee of American Geophysical Union (2022–2023)
- IEEE Geoscience and Remote Sensing Society Distinguished Lecturer (DL).
- Award of IAMG Certificate of Appreciation - 2018 from International Association for Mathematical Geosciences
- Georges Matheron Lectureship Award-2011 from International Association for Mathematical Geosciences '
- CURZONCO-SESHACHALAM LECTURES-5(2009)
- Krishnan Medal 2002 from Indian Geophysical Union
- Dr. Balakrishna Memorial Award 1995 from Regional Centre of Andhra Pradesh Akademi of Sciences
- Fellow, Indian Geophysical Union
- Fellow, Royal Geographical Society
- Fellow, Indian Academy of Sciences
- Fellow, Indian National Science Academy
- Fellow, International Artificial Intelligence Industry Alliance

== Books ==
- Daya Sagar, B.S; Cheng, Q.; McKinley, J.; Agterberg, F., eds. (2023). Encyclopedia of Mathematical Geosciences. Encyclopedia of Earth Sciences Series. Cham: SpringerOpen. doi:10.1007/978-3-030-85040-1. ISBN 978-3-030-85039-5. S2CID 240988561., (Two Volumes), Pages 1756
- Daya Sagar, B.S; Cheng, Q.; Agterberg, F., eds. (2018). Handbook of Mathematical Geosciences: Fifty Years of IAMG. Cham: SpringerOpen. Bibcode:2018hmgf.book.....D. doi:10.1007/978-3-319-78999-6. ISBN 978-3-319-78998-9. S2CID 199493020.
- Daya Sagar, B. S. (2013). Mathematical morphology in geomorphology and GISci. Boca Raton: CRC Press. ISBN 9781439872000.
- Daya Sagar, B. S. (2005). Qualitative Models of Certain Discrete Natural Features of Drainage Environment. New Delhi: Allied Publishers. ISBN 9788177644463.

== See also ==
- International Association for Mathematical Geosciences
