= William Christian Krumbein Medal =

Award of the International Association for Mathematical Geosciences

The William Christian Krumbein Medal is the highest award given alternate years by the International Association for Mathematical Geosciences (IAMG) to senior scientists for career achievement, which includes (a) distinction in application of mathematics or informatics in the earth sciences, (b) service to the IAMG, and (c) support to professions involved in the earth sciences. There is no stipulated preference for fields of application within the earth sciences. The William Christian Krumbein Medal, named after William Christian Krumbein, was established in 1976. Designed by sculptor Abbott Pattison, The medal is made of bronze, and it measures 96 millimeters in diameter and weighs over 500 grams.

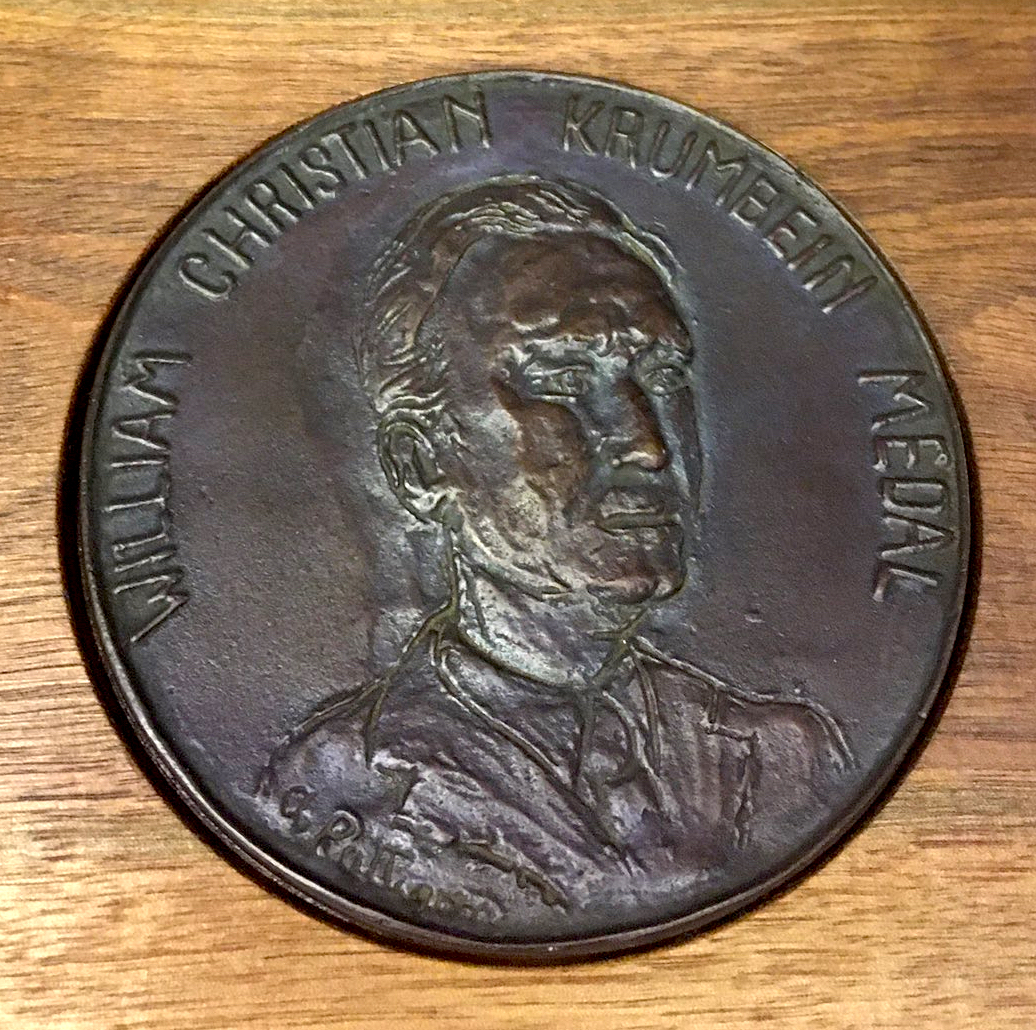
Front side of the Krumbein Medal awarded to Prof. E.J.M. Carranza in 2022. It shows a relief sculpture of Krumbein in the center and a signature of the sculptor Abbott Pattison at the bottom left.

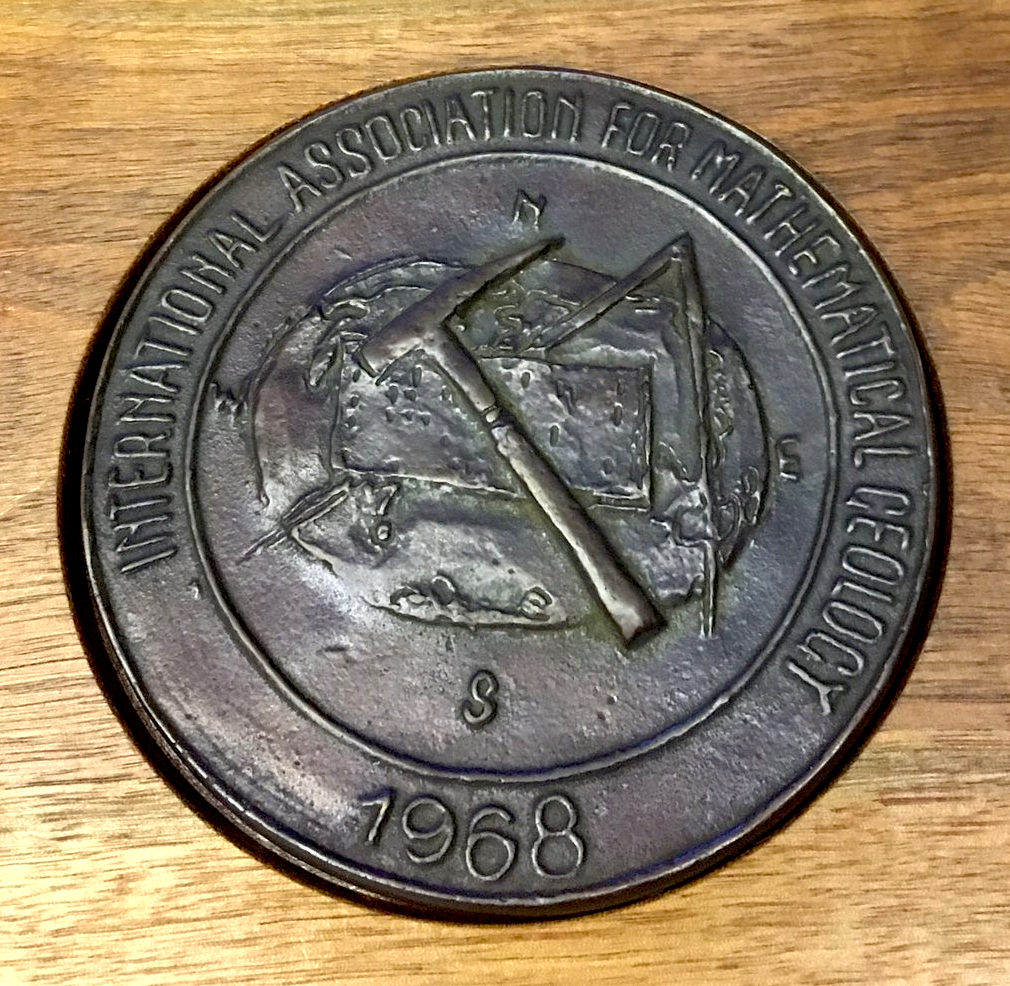
Back side of the same medal. IAMG changed it name from International Association for Mathematical Geology to International Association for Mathematical Geosciences in the 2000s. The medal still shows the old name as a batch of them were crafted before the change.

== Recipients ==
As listed by the IAMG:

- 1976 John C. Griffiths
- 1977 Walther Schwarzacher
- 1978 Frederik P. Agterberg
- 1979 Richard A. Reyment
- 1980 Andrei B. Vistelius
- 1981 Daniel F. Merriam
- 1982 Danie G. Krige
- 1983 Georges Matheron (Declined to receive the medal)
- 1984 Felix Chayes
- 1985 John W. Harbaugh
- 1986 John C Davis
- 1987 Michel David
- 1988 E. H. Timothy Whitten
- 1989 André G. Journel
- 1990 Zhao Pengda
- 1991 Václav Němec
- 1992 Richard B. McCammon
- 1993 DeVerle P. Harris
- 1994 Dmitrii A. Rodionov
- 1995 John Aitchison
- 1996 Jan Harff
- 1998 Graeme Bonham-Carter
- 2000 Richard J. Howarth
- 2002 Michael Ed. Hohn
- 2004 Ricardo A. Olea
- 2006 Vera Pawlowsky-Glahn
- 2008 Qiuming Cheng
- 2010 Lawrence J. Drew
- 2012 Eric Grunsky
- 2014 Jef Caers
- 2016 Peter Dowd
- 2018 Roussos Dimitrakopoulos
- 2020 Jaime Gómez-Hernández
- 2022 Emmanuel John Carranza
- 2024 Jennifer McKinley
- 2026 Peter Atkinson

== See also ==
- List of geology awards
- List of geophysics awards
- List of mathematics awards
