= Daniel Francis Merriam =

American geologist

Daniel F. Merriam
- Born: February 2, 1927; Nebraska, U.S.
- Died: April 26, 2017 (aged 90); Lawrence, Kansas, U.S.
- Education: University of Kansas; Leicester University
- Occupation: Scientist
- Known for: Quantitative Techniques in Geology; Computers in Geosciences
- Awards: Krumbein Medal; William Smith Medal
- Scientific career
- Workplaces: Syracuse University; Wichita State University; Stanford University; Kansas Geological Survey
- Website: KGS Bio

Daniel Francis Merriam (February 2, 1927 – April 26, 2017) was an American geologist best known for fostering the development of quantitative modeling in geology after the advent of digital computers. He first joined the Kansas Geological Survey in 1953, initially working under the direction Raymond C. Moore to have a more accurate knowledge about the geology of the state. His fascination with the new possibilities offered by computers started ten years later while working with John W. Harbaugh at Stanford University as Visiting Research Scientist. In the following seven years, he was active organizing colloquia and as editor of the Computer Contributions, who saw 50 publications in the series by pioneers in the new field. Merriam accepted the position of Chairman of the Department of Geology at Syracuse University in 1971 and moved to the same position at Wichita State University in 1981, coming back to the Kansas Geological Survey in 1991 to retire in 1997, remaining as an Emeritus Scientist.

Consistent with his interest to promote the use of computers in geology, Dan was instrumental in founding the International Association for Mathematical Geology (IAMG) in 1968, serving as its second Secretary General (1972–1976) and third President (1976–1980). In 1969, he started for the Association what is today the Mathematical Geosciences journal and in 1975 Computers & Geosciences jointly with IAMG and Pergamon Press. He received the William Christian Krumbein Medal in 1982 in appreciation for his services to the IAMG and the profession and a festschrift in 1993. In 1992, the Geological Society (London) presented him the William Smith Medal.

== Education ==
- BS in geology, 1949,University of Kansas
- MS in geology, 1953, University of Kansas
- MSc in geology, 1969, Leicester University
- PhD, 1961, University of Kansas
- DSc, 1975, Leicester University

== Selected bibliography ==
- Daniel F. Merriam, and John C. Davis, eds. (2001). Geologic Modeling and Simulation: Sedimentary Systems. Kluwer Academic/Plenum Publishers, 352 p.
- Andrea Förster and Daniel F. Merriam, eds. (1999). Geothermics and Basin Analysis. Kluwer Academic/Plenum Publishers, 240 p.
- Andrea Förster and Daniel F. Merriam, eds. (1996). Geologic Modeling and Mapping. Pergamon Press, 334 p.
- Jan Harff and Daniel F. Merriam, eds. (1993). Computerized Basin Analysis: The Prognosis of Energy and Mineral Resources. Plenum Press, 340 p.
- Hans Kürzl and Daniel F. Merriam, eds. (1992). Use of Microcomputers in Geology. Plenum Press, 285 p.
- Daniel F. Merriam, ed. (1988). Current Trends in Geomathematics. Plenum Press, 334 p.
- Daniel F. Merriam, ed. (1981). Computers Applications in the Earth Sciences: An Update of the 70s. Plenum Press, 385 p.
- Daniel F. Merriam, ed. (1976). Quantitative Techniques for the Analysis of Sediments: A Symposium
- Daniel F. Merriam, ed. (1976). Random Processes in Geology. Springer-Verlag, 168 p.
- Daniel F. Merriam, ed. (1969). Mathematical Models of Sedimentary Processes. Plenum Press, 271 p.
- Daniel F. Merriam, ed. (1970) Geostatistics: A Colloquium. Plenum Press, 177 p.
- Daniel F. Merriam, ed. (1969). Computer Applications in the Earth Sciences. Plenum Press, 282 p.
- John W. Harbaugh and Daniel F. Merriam (1968). Computer Applications in Stratigraphic Analysis. John Wiley & Sons, 282 p.
- Daniel F. Merriam (1963). The Geologic History of Kansas. Bulletin 162, State Geological Survey of Kansas, University of Kansas Publications, 317 p.
