= Andhra University College of Engineering =

First Indian institution to have department of chemical engineering

Coordinates: 17.725°N 83.327°E

- Motto: Tejasvi Navadhitamastu (from the Taittiriya āraṇyaka of the Yajurveda, 8.0.0)
- Motto in English: "May the Divine Light illuminate our studies."
- Type: Public
- Established: 1955
- Affiliations: UGC
- Chancellor: Governor of Andhra Pradesh
- Vice-Chancellor: G. P. Raja Sekhar
- Principal: G. Sasibhusana Rao
- Location: Visakhapatnam, Andhra Pradesh, India
- Campus: Urban
- Website: www.andhrauniversity.edu.in

Andhra University College of Engineering, also known as AU College of Engineering, is an autonomous college and extension campus of the Andhra University located at Visakhapatnam, India. It is the first Indian institution to have a Department of Chemical Engineering.

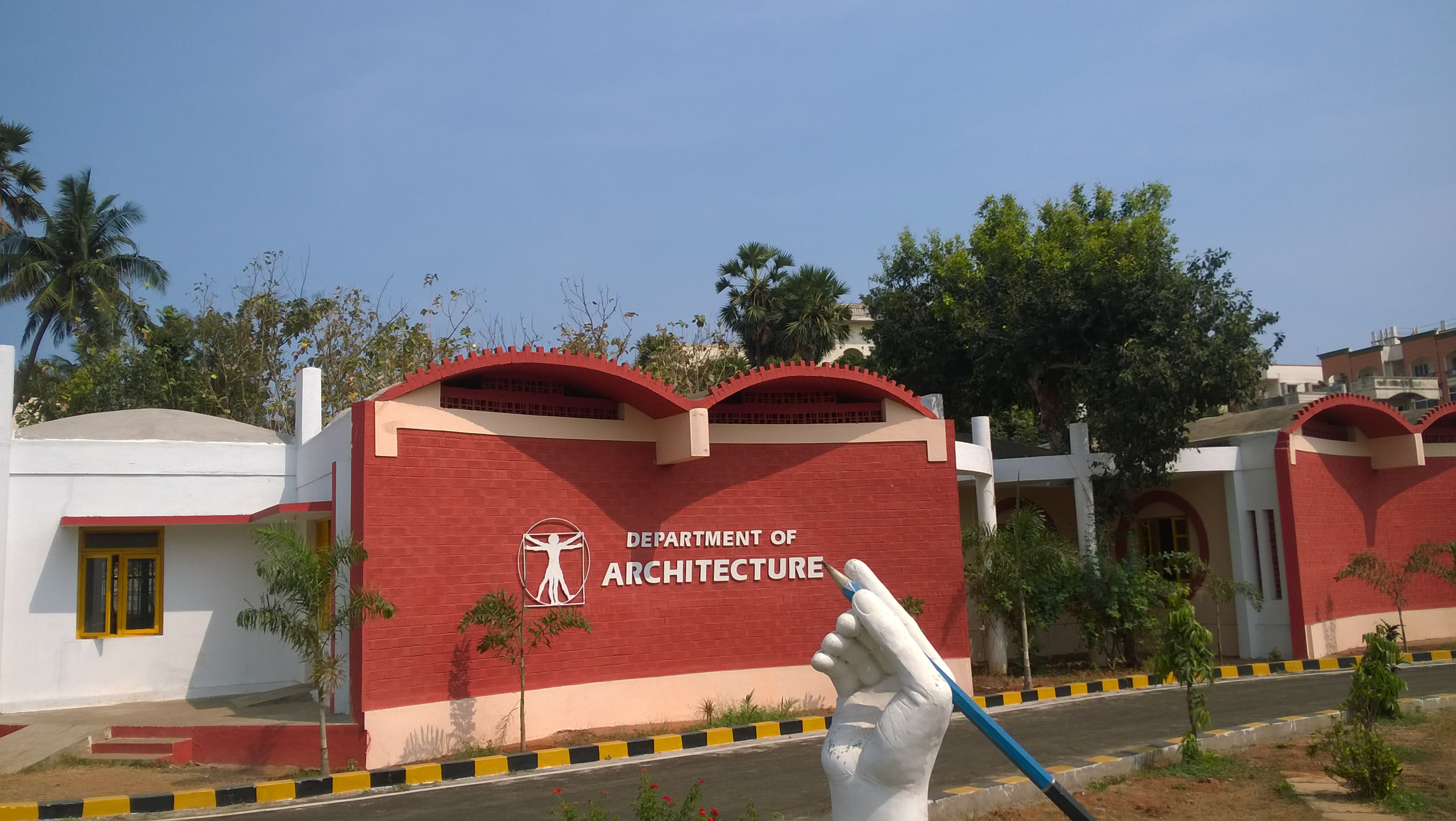
Department of Architecture at AUCE

== History ==
The Andhra University College of Engineering was established in 1955 as the Department of Engineering by Prof. Devaguptapu Seethapathi Rao (Electrical) and Prof. Kalavapudi Krishnamacharyulu (Civil Engineering) under the administrations of Vice Chancellor V.S. Krishna and further support by Vice Chancellor A L Narayana. Civil Engineering, Mechanical Engineering and Electrical Engineering were the main branches in the department at this time. Prof. D. Seetahpati Rao (Electrical) also headed the Department of Engineering until 1966, supported by senior professors K. Krishnamacharyulu (Civil), Prof. P.V.B. Bushana Rao (Mechanical), Prof. M.S. Raju, and Prof. L.B.K. Sastry (Electrical), and Prof. Venkateswaralu (Chemical), and Prof. T. Venugopal Rao (Mechanical).

In 1960, the Department of Engineering was shifted to the present North campus spread over 165 acres (0.67 km^{2}). The Department of Chemical Technology, instituted in 1933, was shifted to the same campus in 1962, ading to the existing engineering branches. In 1966, the Department of Engineering was converted into the College of Engineering (Autonomous), and became a constituent of the Andhra University.

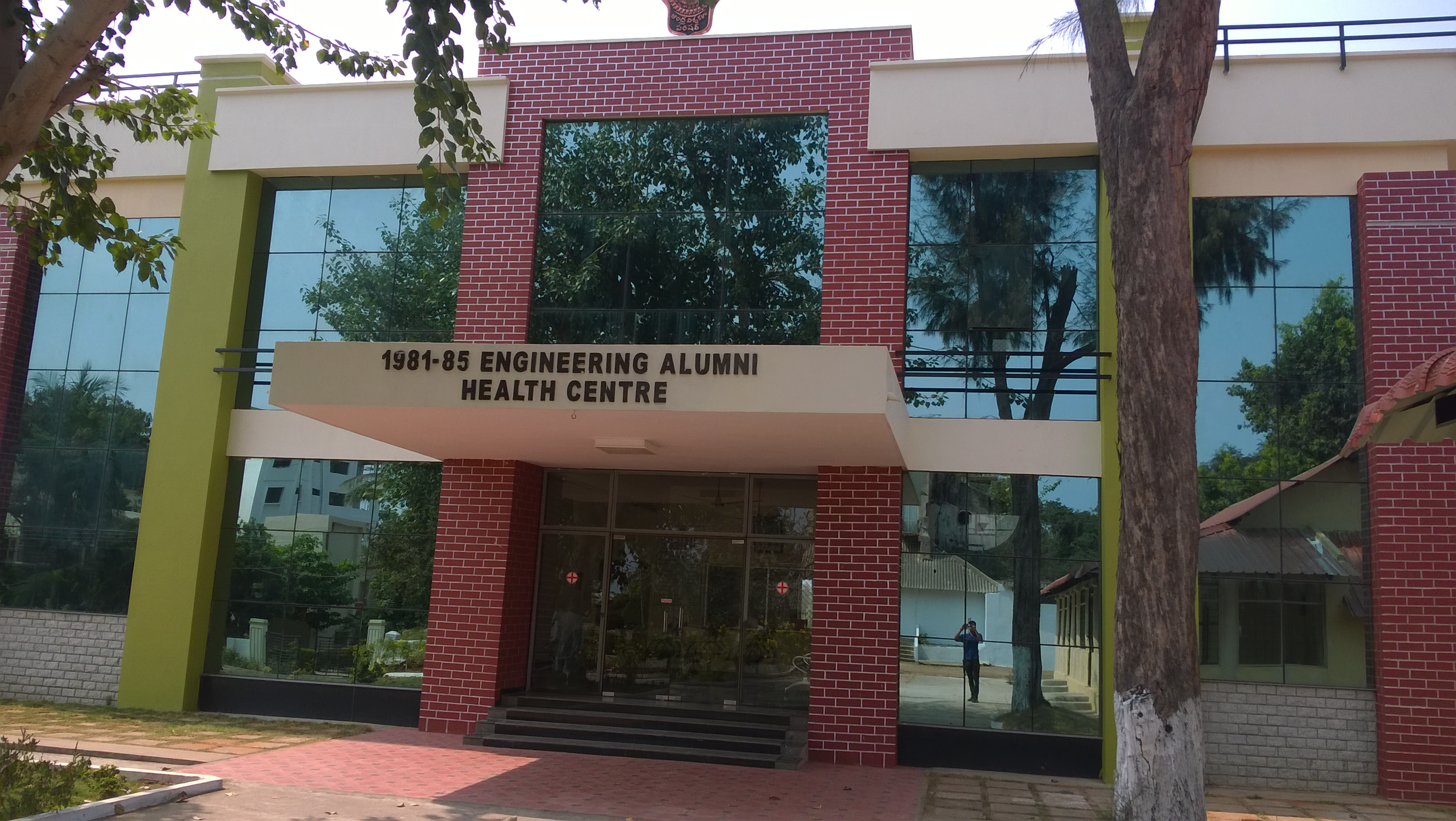
Health center at AUCE

== Structure ==
The College of Engineering consists of 12 engineering and four basic science departments, offering 15 undergraduate Engineering full-time programs and four undergraduate engineering part-time programs. 28 postgraduate engineering programs, an MCA program and three M.Sc. programs are also offered. All the departments run PhD programs in research. The college has Centres of Excellence carrying out research in specialized areas.

The college is graded along with the Andhra University by the National Assessment and Accreditation Council (NAAC), and has been awarded a rating of A+ (85%).

The college is one of the four lead institutions selected in the state of Andhra Pradesh for World Bank aid.

== Admission ==
Students are admitted into the undergraduate programs based on their score in the Engineering Agricultural and Medical Common Entrance Test (EAMCET) conducted by the Government of Andhra Pradesh.

Students can also be admitted into undergraduate courses through a test called Andhra University Engineering Entrance Test (AUEET) for six-year Integrated Dual Degree courses and twinning programs. In this course, both Bachelor of Technology and Master of Technology degrees will be completed in 5 years.

Students are admitted into postgraduate programs based on their Graduate Aptitude Test in Engineering (GATE) scores and rankings or their ranking in the Post Graduate Engineering Common Entrance Test (PGECET) conducted by the Government of Andhra Pradesh.

== Academics ==
=== Engineering Curriculum Development ===
The college follows a four-year duration (one year + six semesters) with external mode of examination for B.E./B.Tech./B.Arch./B.Pharm. programmes. It follows a four semester course for the M.E./M.Tech. programmes. It also offers five-year integrated courses that combine B.Tech. and M.Tech. degrees.

The college follows a two-year duration with an external mode of examination for its M.Sc. (Computer Science) program.

=== Research and Consultancy ===
The faculty of the college is involved in research projects and schemes granted by national level funding agencies such as UGC, AICTE, Department of Atomic Energy and the Department of Telecommunications. The college has projects with Defence Research and Development Organisation, Indian Space Research Organisation, Bhabha Atomic Research Centre, and private companies as well.

The college collaborates on two-year programs in M.Tech/M.Sc (Software Engineering), MS (Signal Processing) and M.Tech/M.Sc (Telecommunications) with Blekinge Institute of Technology, Sweden in a three-year B.Engg. (Aircraft Engineering) program with Perth College, the UK, and in a four-year B.E. (Electromechanical Engineering) program with Group-T International University, Belgium.

=== Engineering departments ===
- Artificial intelligence & machine learning
- Biotechnology
- Chemical Engineering
- Chemical Petro Engineering
- Civil Engineering
- Civil & Environmental Engineering
- Computer Science and Systems Engineering
- Electrical Engineering
- Electronics and Communication Engineering
- Geoinformatics
- Instrument Technology
- Marine Engineering
- Mechanical Engineering
- Metallurgical Engineering
- Naval Architecture
- Pharmaceutical Sciences
- Ceramic Technology
- Information Technology and Computer Applications

=== Basic sciences departments ===
- Engineering Chemistry
- Engineering Mathematics
- Engineering Physics
- Humanities and Social Sciences

=== Centres and institutes ===
- Centre for Biomedical Engineering
- Centre for Technology Forecasting
- International Centre for Bioinformatics
- Advanced Centre for Nanotechnology
- Centre for Biotechnology in the Department of Chemical Engineering
- Centre for Phase Equilibrium Thermodynamics in the Department of Chemical Engineering
- Centre for Energy Systems in the Department of Mechanical Engineering
- Centre for Condition Monitoring and Vibration Diagnostics in the Department of Mechanical Engineering
- Centre for Remote Sensing and Information Systems in the Department of Geo-Engineering
- Centre for Research on Off-Shore Structures in the Department of Civil Engineering

== Affiliations ==
This autonomous engineering college is a constituent of and affiliated to the Andhra University, Visakhapatnam. It is the first general university in the country to get ISO 9001: 2000 Certification in 2006. Andhra University college of engineering is also affiliated by AICTE and UGC.

== Facilities ==
It is the first college in AP to launch a 4G WiFi facility for students on a commercial basis. The campus has a number of basketball, volleyball, tennis courts and two cricket grounds.

The college was part of the International Fleet Review (IFR) 2016, with the IFR village and exhibition located on the campus.

=== Notable alumni ===
Notable alumni include:

- Satya N. Atluri, Mechanical Engineering (1959–1963), Recipient of a Padma Bhushan from the President of India in 2013.
- Anumolu Ramakrishna, Civil Engineering (1959–1963), Recipient of Padma Bhushan from the President of India in 2014.
- B. S. Daya Sagar, Geoengineering (1988–1994), only Asian recipient of Georges Matheron Lectureship Award from International Association for Mathematical Geosciences.
- N. S. Raghavan, Electrical Engineering 1959–1964, co-founder of Infosys (one of the first two, who started Infosys)
- S. Rao Kosaraju, Computer Science (1959–1964), Founder of the Kosaraju's algorithm, which finds the strongly connected components of a directed graph
- Grandhi Mallikarjuna Rao, Mechanical Engineering, Founder and Chairman of the GMR Group, which is one of the fastest-growing infrastructure enterprises in India with interests in Airports, Energy, Highways and Urban Infrastructure sectors.
- Kambhampati Hari Babu, Electronics and Communications Engineering, a member of parliament to the 16th Lok Sabha from Visakhapatnam.
- Cherukuri Rajkumar (Azad), former Spokesperson and member of the politburo of the Communist Party of India (Maoist).

== Rankings ==
University and college rankings

Engineering – India
- NIRF (2022): 77

Andhra University College of Engineering was ranked 77 among engineering colleges by the National Institutional Ranking Framework (NIRF) in 2019.
