= John Clements Davis =

American geologist

John C. Davis
- Born: October 21, 1938 (age 87); Neodesha, Kansas, United States
- Education: University of Kansas; University of Wyoming
- Occupation: Scientist
- Known for: Quantitative modeling in geology
- Awards: Krumbein Medal; Haidinger Medal
- Scientific career
- Workplaces: Kansas Geological Survey; Montanuniversität Leoben; Heinemann Oil GmbH

John Clements Davis (born October 21, 1938) is an American geologist best known for his research in the application of statistics to geology. He spent almost his entire professional career with the Kansas Geological Survey, being an Emeritus Scientist since 2003. He then served as Univ-Prof of Reservoir Characterization at the Montanuniversität in Leoben, Austria and is now Chief Geologist for Heinemann Oil GmbH in Austria.
Davis has been a member of several professional societies, most active in the International Association for Mathematical Geosciences, where he was Editor of the Newsletter (1973–1989), Western Treasurer (1972–1980), Secretary General (1980–1984), President (1984–1989) and Distinguished Lecturer (2002). The Association acknowledged his valuable contributions to the organization and science by presenting him with the Krumbein Medal. Davis also received the Haidinger Medal from the Geologische Bundesanstalt for his contributions to mathematical geology.

== Education ==
- Ph.D. in geology, University of Wyoming, 1967
- M.S. in geology, University of Wyoming, 1963
- B.S. in geology, University of Kansas, 1961

== Books ==
- John C. Davis (2002). Statistics and Data Analysis in Geology. Wiley & Sons, 3rd edition, 638 p.
- John W. Harbaugh, John C. Davis, Johannes Wendebourg (1995). Computing Risk for Oil Prospects: Principles and Programs. Pergamon, 452 p.
- John C. Davis, Ute C. Herzfeld, eds., (1993). Computers in Geology—25 Years of Progress. Oxford University Press, 298 p.
- John W. Harbaugh, John C. Davis, John Doveton (1977). Probability Methods in Oil Exploration. John Wiley & Sons, 284 p.
- John C. Davis, Michael J. McCullagh, eds., (1975). Display & Analysis of Spatial Data. Wiley & Sons, 378 p.
