= Eric Grunsky =

Canadian mathematical geoscientist

Eric C. Grunsky
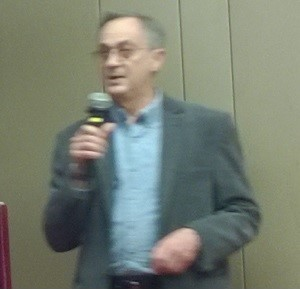
- Grunsky in Beijing, China in 2017
- Citizenship: Canadian
- Education: University of Ottawa; University of Toronto; University of Waterloo
- Known for: Geochemistry; Geoinformatics; Geostatistics
- Awards: William Christian Krumbein Medal (2012); IAMG Distinguished Lectureship (2014)
- Scientific career
- Workplaces: Geological Survey of Canada; University of Waterloo

Eric Christopher Grunsky is a Canadian mathematical geoscientist specialized in statistical petrology. Grunsky received the Felix Chayes Prize in 2005 from the International Association for Mathematical Geosciences and served as Editor-in-Chief for the journal Computers & Geosciences from 2006-2011. He was awarded the Krumbein Medal in 2012 by the International Association for Mathematical Geosciences. He is currently serving International Association for Mathematical Geosciences (IAMG) as its appointed Secretary General.

== Education ==
- PhD University of Ottawa, 1988
- MSc University of Toronto, 1978
- BSc University of Toronto, 1973

== Awards and honors ==
- William Christian Krumbein Medal (2012)
- IAMG Distinguished Lectureship (2014)
