= Roussos Dimitrakopoulos =

Canadian geoscientist

- Education: École Polytechnique de Montréal; University of Alberta
- Occupation: Professor
- Known for: Geostatistics; stochastic optimization
- Awards: William Christian Krumbein Medal
- Scientific career
- Institutions: McGill University
- Website: www.chairs-chaires.gc.ca/chairholders-titulaires/profile-eng.aspx?profileID=1555

Roussos Dimitrakopoulos is a Canadian geoscientist, and a professor at McGill University. He was selected to receive the William Christian Krumbein Medal in 2018 from the International Association for Mathematical Geosciences. He was also the recipient of the Georges Matheron Lectureship Award 2015 from the International Association for Mathematical Geosciences. Since 2007 Dimitrakopoulos has been the Editor-in-Chief of Mathematical Geosciences.
