= Jaime Gómez-Hernández =

Civil engineer, Hydrogeologist, Mathematical geologist

- Born: 1960 (age 65–66); Requena, Valencia, Spain
- Education: Universitat Politècnica de València; Stanford University
- Awards: Spanish IAH Chapter Custodio and Llamas Lifetime Achievement; Tunisian Water Award; InterPore Lifetime Achievement Medal; Carlos Ruiz Celaá Lifetime Achievement Prize; Technical University of Valencia Lifetime Achievement Research Prize in Civil Engineering; Prince Sultan bin Abdulaziz International Prize for Water; EWRI Pioneers in Groundwater; William Christian Krumbein Medal; Technical University of Valencia Social Council Prize for Improving University Outreach; Prize for Research and Technology of Wastes
- Scientific career
- Fields: Geostatistics; Stochastic Hydrogeology; Inverse Modeling
- Website: jgomez.webs.upv.es

J. Jaime Gómez-Hernández (born 1960) is a Spanish civil engineer specialized in geostatistics and hydrogeology. He is a full professor of hydraulic engineering at the School of Civil Engineering of the Technical University of Valencia. He was conferred the William Christian Krumbein Medal in 2020 from the International Association for Mathematical Geosciences. He also received the 2020 Prince Sultan bin Abdulaziz International Prize for Water in the field of groundwater. In 2026, he got the InterPore Lifetime Achievement Medal.

== Education ==
- BS in Civil Engineering from Technical University of Valencia in 1983
- MS in Applied Hydrogeology from Stanford University in 1987
- PhD in Geostatistics for Natural Resources Evaluation from Stanford University in 1990

== Biography ==
Born on 28 October 1960, in Requena, Spain, Gómez-Hérnandez earned his Civil Engineering Bachelor's degree from the Technical University of Valencia in 1983. After a year working for the Valencian delegation of the Spanish company EPTISA, where he implemented the first aquifer numerical models using just his ZX Spectrum connected to a portable TV, he moved to Stanford University in 1984 to pursue an MS in Applied Hydrogeology under the supervision of Irwin Remson of the Applied Earth Sciences Department. This was followed by a PhD at Stanford in Geostatistics for Natural Resources Characterization under the supervision of Andre Journel. Upon his return to Spain in 1990, he worked for the Spanish company EVREN as a civil engineer, and in 1994, he joined the School of Civil Engineering at the Technical University of Valencia as an associate professor. He became a full professor in 2000, the position at which he remains active.

== Research ==
Gómez-Hernández's MS thesis (1987) dealt with the application of the Kalman filter for network design in aquifers. 30 years later, he would supervise several PhD theses and publish a number of important papers on the use of the ensemble Kalman filter for inverse modeling in aquifers. His PhD thesis dealt with the use of geostatistics for the upscaling of hydraulic conductivity in heterogeneous aquifers. Heterogeneity, aquifer characterization, and uncertainty quantification have been the main topics around which his research has revolved. His research can also be grouped into the following four main subjects:

=== Algorithm and code development ===
Gómez-Hernández developed for his PhD a stochastic simulation technique for random functions that was much more precise and versatile than other contemporary codes, and, more importantly, without limitations on the size of the realizations to be generated. This technique is included in the public domain codes ISIM3D and GCOSIM3D. These codes have been incorporated into commercial programs and have been used routinely by institutions such as the University of Arizona, the British Nuclear Waste Management Agency (NIREX), and the Polytechnic University of Catalonia.

=== Upscaling ===
The need to establish a link between laboratory measurements of parameters, such as permeability, and the values that should be used in mathematical models for large scale predictions is a central topic of Gómez-Hernández's PhD dissertation, out of which a new methodology for the characterization of the spatial variability of permeability at various scales was developed. In this field, he was the first to demonstrate the difference between block values and effective values and show that block values depend on the block size and are generally non-local.

=== The need for non-Gaussian models ===
Gómez-Hernández proposed a paradigm shift in describing how the parameters that control groundwater flow and solute transport are spatially distributed in the subsurface. His 1998 paper, "To be or not to be multi-Gaussian?" proposed a radical change in the way of understanding and modeling the subsurface. For two decades, a Gaussian model had been used to describe the heterogeneity of aquifers, and a large body of research had been built on the hypothesis that hydraulic conductivity distributions are Gaussian. His paper demonstrated the potentially harmful implications of adopting a Gaussian model and proposed a new one.

=== Stochastic inverse modeling ===
Gómez-Hernández also proposed a paradigm shift in modeling the transport of dissolved solutes in groundwater. In 1992, as a member of the INTRAVAL project—financed by a pool of nuclear waste management agencies—whose objective was the validation of codes for flow and transport in the subsurface, he detected a serious error in the simulation of scenarios of failure. He pointed out that predictions of waste residual movement should not be made using “mean permeabilities”, but that predictions should instead be made using realistic distributions of permeabilities before calculating mean values. That shift in focus has become critical today for making predictions of solute transport in any context and for evaluating the uncertainty of those predictions. He demonstrated the need for this change of paradigm in his 1994 article, "Probabilistic assessment of travel times", and then developed a new inverse modeling technique, which appeared in a series of three articles collectively titled, "Stochastic simulation of transmissivity fields". The proposed method, coined as the "self-calibrating method", was the most efficient method in aquifer inverse modeling during a code intercomparison exercise promoted by the US Sandia National Laboratories. The results of this benchmarking exercise are collected in the 1998 article, "A comparison of seven geostatistically-based inverse approaches."

As a result of this paradigm shift from traditional inverse modeling to stochastic inverse modeling, Gómez-Hernández has focused on the development of new techniques that would improve the results of the self-calibrating method. A number of his more recent papers demonstrate the applicability of the ensemble Kalman filter to this task, of which a seminal one is the 2011 article, "An approach to handling non-Gaussianity on parameters".

== Awards ==
- Custodio and Llamas Lifetime Achievement Award, International Association of Hydrogeologists - Spanish Chapter, 2026
- Tunisian Water Award, Ibn Shabbat Award, Higher School of Engineers of Medjez El Bab (ESIM), 2026
- InterPore Lifetime Achievement Medal, International Society on Porous Media (InterPore), 2026
- Carlos Ruiz Celaá Lifetime Achievement Prize, Asociación Nacional de Ingenieros de Minas, Spain, 2026
- Lifetime Achievement Research Prize in Civil Engineering, Technical University of Valencia, Spain, 2024
- Pioneers in Groundwater, Environmental and Water Resources Institute, American Society of Civil Engineering, 2022
- Forbes' Top 50 Awarded Spaniards, Forbes Spain, 2021
- Distinguished Lecturer, International Association of Mathematical Geosciences, 2021
- Prince Sultan bin Abdulaziz International Prize for Water: Groundwater, 2020
- Prize for Improving University Outreach, Social Council of the Technical University of Valencia, Spain, 2020
- William Christian Krumbein Medal, International Association of Mathematical Geosciences, 2020
- Top Reviewers for Environmental Sciences, Publons, 2017
- Sentinel of Science, Publons, 2016
- Certificate for Excellence in Reviewing, Advances in Water Resources, Elsevier, The Netherlands, 2013
- Valencian Region Prize on Research on Waste Disposal, Valencian Government, Spain, 1999
- Editor's Citation for Excellence in Refereeing, Water Resources Research, American Geophysical Union, USA, 1993
- Stanford University Centennial Teaching Assistant, Stanford University, USA, 1990
- School of Earth Sciences Outstanding Teaching Award, Stanford University, USA, 1990
- National Prize for Best Civil Engineering Graduate, Minister of Education, Spain, 1983
- Head of the Class, Civil Engineering, Valencia, Spain, 1983
