= Grunsky =

Grunsky is a Russian surname. Notable people with the surname include:

- Carl E. Grunsky (1855–1934), American geologist and civil engineer
- Donald L. Grunsky (1915-2000), American politician
- Eric Grunsky, Canadian scientist
- Helmut Grunsky (1904–1986), German mathematician
- Jack Grunsky (born 1945), Canadian singer-songwriter
- Matthias Grunsky (born 1971), Austrian cinematographer
