= Walther Schwarzacher =

Walther Schwarzacher (born March 2, 1925) is an Austrian geologist best known for his research in quantitative stratigraphy. He is a Corresponding Member of the Division of Mathematics and the Natural Sciences of the Austrian Academy of Sciences and the second recipient of the William Christian Krumbein Medal, the highest award of the International Association for Mathematical Geosciences (IAMG).

== Early and personal life ==
Walther was born in Graz, Austria, the second son of the forensic medic Professor Walther Schwarzacher and his wife Hedwig. In 1938, following the Anschluss, Walther's father lost his position at the University of Graz. As a result, Walther spent the war years with his family on the Wallersee, a lake near Salzburg. This was a time when he developed his interest in studying the local geology as he helped his father with scientific investigations. After the war, Walther moved to Innsbruck to study, completing both his undergraduate studies and his doctoral dissertation in a total of four years at the University of Innsbruck, under the supervision of Bruno Sander. He was then awarded a British Council Scholarship to the University of Cambridge. From Cambridge, Walther moved to Queen's University Belfast, where he was based for the remainder of his career. He married his wife, June, in 1963 and they had two sons, Walther and Martin.

== Career ==
Walther joined Queen's University Belfast as an assistant lecturer in 1949. He was promoted to Lecturer, Reader in 1964 and eventually Professor when he was appointed to a personal chair in Mathematical Geosciences in 1977. In 1967/68 Walther was Distinguished Visiting Lecturer in the newly formed mathematical geology section at the Kansas Geological Survey. Walther also spent sabbaticals at the University of Kiel.

Two of Walther's influential sedimentology books are Sedimentation Models and Quantitative Stratigraphy (1975) and Cyclostratigraphy and the Milankovitch theory (1993). In the first book, he describes stochastic models for sedimentary processes, which involve Markov chains and semi-Markov processes. The second discusses Milankovitch cycles for coupled limestone and marl beds, drawing from his own research. Walther also wrote many international publications and chapters.
