= Zhao Pengda =

Chinese mathematical geologist

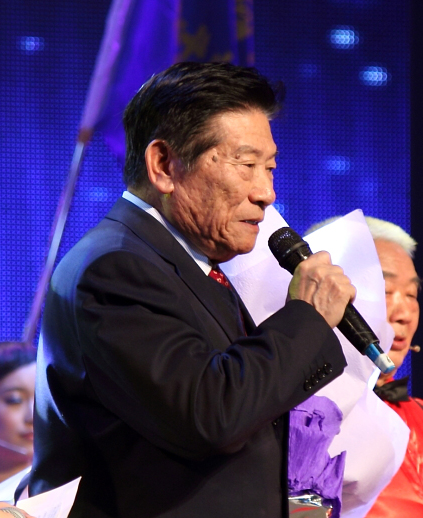
- Zhao Pengda in 2012
- Born: 1931 (age 94–95); Qingyuan, Liaoning, China
- Education: Beijing University; Moscow Geological Surveys College
- Awards: William Christian Krumbein Medal (1990); Academician of the Chinese Academy of Sciences
- Scientific career
- Fields: Mathematical Geology; Mineral Exploration and Reconnaissance
- Workplaces: China University of Geosciences (Wuhan)

Zhao Pengda (Chinese: 赵鹏大; born in 1931) is a Chinese mathematical geologist. He was a professor at the China University of Geosciences (Wuhan). He was the first Asian to receive the William Christian Krumbein Medal in 1990 from International Association for Mathematical Geosciences. He is considered as the Father of Mathematical Geology in China. He is an academician of the Chinese Academy of Sciences.

== Education ==
- 1958 Graduate, Moscow Geological Surveys College Russia, Moscow (Received Associate Doctorate)
- 1952 Graduate, Beijing University, Geology Department Beijing Municipality

== Career ==
- Commissioner, State Academic Degrees Committee
- Professor, China University of Geosciences (Wuhan)
- President, China University of Geosciences (Wuhan)
- 1995 — Foreign Academician, Russian Academy of Natural Sciences
- 1995 Academician, (International University Science Institute)
- 1993 — Academician, Chinese Academy of Sciences

== Awards and honors ==
- William Christian Krumbein Medal (1990)
- Academician of the Chinese Academy of Sciences
