= John H. Schuenemeyer =

American academic

John H (Jack) Schuenemeyer
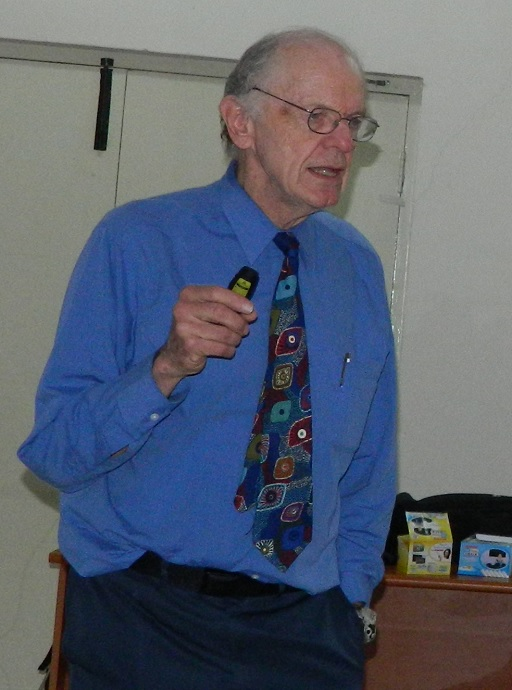
- Schuenemeyer in 2012
- Born: United States
- Education: University of Colorado; University of Georgia
- Awards: IAMG Distinguished Lectureship; John Cedric Griffiths Teaching Award; Fellow American Statistical Association
- Scientific career
- Fields: Statistics
- Workplaces: US Geological Survey; University of Delaware; Southwest Statistical Consulting, LLC

John H (Jack) Schuenemeyer is President of Southwest Statistical Consulting, Cortez, Colorado. He is also Professor Emeritus of Statistics, Geology, and Geography, University of Delaware. Schuenemeyer was elected as a Fellow of the American Statistical Association in 1991. International Association for Mathematical Geosciences has awarded him the IAMG Distinguished Lectureship in 2012. In 2004, he was awarded John Cedric Griffiths Teaching Award by the International Association for Mathematical Geosciences.

== Education ==
- BS in applied mathematics, University of Colorado
- MS in applied mathematics, University of Colorado
- PhD in statistics, University of Georgia

== Selected Book ==
- John Schuenemeyer and Larry Drew, Statistics for Earth and Environmental Scientists, Wiley, 2011, page 420.
- Richard F. Link and John H. Schuenemeyer, Computer programs for geology, Artronic Information Systems, 1972, p. 142.
