= Graeme Bonham-Carter =

Canadian geologist

- Born: 1939 (age 86–87); United Kingdom
- Citizenship: Canada
- Education: Cambridge University; University of Toronto
- Known for: Geomathematics and Geographical Information Systems
- Awards: William Christian Krumbein Medal
- Scientific career
- Fields: Geology; Geographic Information Systems; Geomathematics
- Workplaces: Stanford University; University of Rochester; Geological Survey of Canada

Graeme Bonham-Carter (born in 1939) is a UK-born Canadian mathematical geologist.

== Biography ==
By birth, member of the prominent Bonham Carter family, he served as president of the International Association for Mathematical Geosciences (IAMG) from 2000 to 2004. He was Editor-in-Chief of the journal Computers & Geosciences from 1996 to 2005. He received the William Christian Krumbein Medal in 1998 from the IAMG.

== Education ==
- BA in Natural Sciences and Geology, Cambridge University in 1962
- MA in Geology, University of Toronto in 1963
- PhD in Geology, University of Toronto in 1966
- Post Doc Stanford University 1966-1969

== Book(s) ==
- John W. Harbaugh, Graeme Bonham-Carter, Computer Simulation in Geology, Wiley-Interscience, 1970, 575 p. Republished by Krieger, 1981.
- Graeme F. Bonham-Carter, Geographic Information Systems for Geoscientists: Modelling with GIS (Computer Methods in the Geosciences), Pergamon Press, 1994, now Elsevier, p. 398, 2014
- Graeme Bonham-Carter, Qiuming Cheng (Eds), Progress in Geomathematics, Springer Publishers, 2008, p. 554.
