= Computers & Geosciences =

- Discipline: Computing, Earth sciences
- Language: English

Standard abbreviations
- ISO 4: Comput. Geosci.

Indexing
- ISSN: 0098-3004

Links
- Journal homepage

Computers & Geosciences is a scientific journal published monthly by Elsevier on behalf of the International Association for Mathematical Geosciences. It contains research and review papers in computing applied to geosciences. Its impact factor is 3.372.

== See also ==
- Geocomputation
- Geoinformatics
- Geomathematics
