= Ricardo A. Olea =

Chilean-American geologist

Ricardo Olea
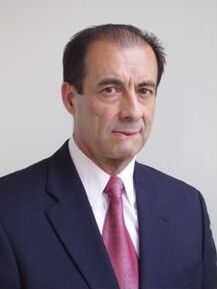
- Olea in Reston, VA, 2009
- Born: 1 July 1942 (age 84); Santiago, Chile
- Education: Universidad de Chile; University of Kansas
- Known for: Regionalized variable theory
- Spouse: Lucila Amelia Olea
- Children: Claudia, Ricardo, Pablo
- Awards: Krumbein Medal
- Scientific career
- Workplaces: United States Geological Survey; Kansas Geological Survey; Empresa Nacional del Petróleo
- Website: www.usgs.gov/staff-profiles/ricardo-olea

Ricardo Antonio Olea (Spanish pronunciation: [riˈkaɾðo anˈtonjo oˈlea]) is a Chilean American who was a research mathematical statistician with the United States Geological Survey (2006–21). Previously, he spent most of his career with the National Oil Company of Chile (ENAP) in Punta Arenas and Santiago, and with the Kansas Geological Survey in Lawrence. He received the William Christian Krumbein Medal in 2004 from the International Association for Mathematical Geosciences. He served as Secretary-General (1992−1996) and President (1996–2000) for the International Association for Mathematical Geosciences; and Secretary General (2019–21) of the Compositional Data Association.

== Research ==
He has been active in geostatistics since the early 1970s, with briefer involvements in various other forms of quantitative modeling, including geophysics, petrophysics, reservoir engineering, energy resources assessment, compositional data analysis, lithostratigraphy, statistics, enhanced oil recovery, coastal processes, economic analysis, coal mining, geohydrology, marine geology, epidemiology ichnology and chemometrics.

== Selected books ==
- Ricardo A. Olea, ed., Geostatistical Glossary and Multilingual Dictionary, Oxford, 1991, 177p.
- Ricardo A. Olea, Geostatistics for Engineers and Earth Scientists, Kluwer, 1999, 313 p.
- Vera Pawlowsky-Glahn, Ricardo A. Olea, Geostatistical Analysis of Compositional Data, Oxford, 2004, 181 p.
- George Christakos, Ricardo A. Olea, Marc L. Serre, Hwa-Lung Yu, Lin-Lin Wang, Interdisciplinary Public Health Reasoning and Epidemic Modelling: The Case of Black Death, Springer, 2005, 319 p.
