= Gabor Korvin =

Hungarian mathematician (born 1942)

- Born: Hungary
- Citizenship: Hungary
- Occupation: Academic / Scientist
- Known for: Fractal geometry in Earth Sciences
- Scientific career
- Fields: Fractal geometry; Statistical Rock Physics; Inverse Problems; Geostatistics
- Institutions: King Fahd University of Petroleum and Minerals; University of Adelaide; Hungarian Geophysical Institute

Gabor Korvin (born in 1942 in Hungary) is a Hungarian Mathematician. He served as a professor at the Department of Earth Sciences, King Fahd University of Petroleum and Minerals. His main areas of research interest include fractal geometry in the earth sciences, statistical rock physics and mathematical geophysics. He is a well-known Applied Mathematician, Geophysicist, Petrophysicist, Historian. At KFUPM he was Coordinator of the Reservoir Characterization Research Group. As Professor, he taught Reservoir Characterization, Seismic Stratigraphy, Petrophysics & Well logging, Solid Earth Geophysics, Geoelectric Exploration, Reflection Seismology, Inverse Problems, Geostatistics and Reservoir Characterization. Fractal Models in the Earth Sciences by Gabor Korvin was one of the earlier books on the application of Fractals in the Earth Sciences.

== Education ==
- Ph.D. in geophysics, Univ. Heavy Industries, Miskolc, Hungary, 1978
- M.Sc. in Applied Mathematics, Univ. Nat. Sciences, Budapest, Hungary, 1966
- Graduate Diploma in Islamic Studies, Univ. New England, Armidale, Australia, 1998

== Employment ==
- 1966–1985, Exploration seismologist and software developer in the Hungarian Geophysical Institute, Budapest
- 1986–1991, Senior Lecturer, University of Adelaide, Australia
- 1994–2016, Professor of Geophysics, King Fahd University of Petroleum and Minerals (KFUPM), Saudi Arabia.

== Books ==
- Korvin, G., "Fractal Models in the Earth Sciences"
