= Andre G. Journel =

French American engineer

André Journel
- Education: École Nationale Supérieure des Mines de Nancy; University of Nancy
- Known for: Geostatistics
- Spouse: Sylvie Journel
- Children: 4
- Awards: Lucas Gold Medal
- Scientific career
- Workplaces: Centre de Morphologie Mathématique; Stanford University
- Website: earth.stanford.edu/andre-journel

André Georges Journel is a French American engineer who excelled in formulating and promoting geostatistics in the earth sciences and engineering, first from the Centre of Mathematical Morphology in Fontainebleau, France and later from Stanford University.

In 1998, Journel was elected a member of the National Academy of Engineering for the theory and practice of geostatistics in earth resources and environmental assessment.

== Education ==
- D.Sc., University of Nancy, Applied Mathematics, 1977
- M.S2., University of Nancy, Doctor of Engineering, 1974
- B.Sc., École Nationale Supérieure des Mines de Nancy, Nancy, Mining Engineering, 1967

== Early professional career in France ==
André joined the Paris School of Mines research group at Fontainebleau, under the direction of Georges Matheron, as a Mining Project Engineer in 1969, moving to Head of Research four years later. He remained active primarily teaching courses, doing consulting work for mining companies around the world, and simultaneously formulating new methods often to solve pressing problems. From these days are his contributions to kriging with a trend and to stochastic simulation. The book with Charles Huijbregts is a culmination to his endeavors as mining geostatistician from his native country.

== Second stage at Stanford University ==
Journel accepted a position as an assistant professor at the Department of Applied Earth Sciences in 1978. The physical relocation was shortly followed by a reorientation of his research from mining to petroleum engineering. He was promoted to full professor in 1986 and within the year appointed chairman of the department, serving for a period of six years. He was the mentor of several generations of students and enthusiastic promoter of joint research with industry through the Stanford Center for Reservoir Forecasting that he founded also in 1986, remaining as its Director until 2007. Among his numerous research interest and accomplishments, it is worth mentioning his contributions to non-parametric geostatistics, non-Gaussian geostatistics, training-image based simulation and probabilistic data integration. André has been an Emeritus Professor since 2010.

== Awards and honors ==
André's accomplishments made him the recipient of prestigious awards, including the William Christian Krumbein Medal from the International Association for Mathematical Geosciences (1989), the Stanford University School of Earth Sciences Teaching Award (1995), and the Lucas Gold Medal from the Society of Petroleum Engineers (1998).
Most notable honors are his appointment as Director of the NATO Institute of Geostatistics (1983); selection as the Keynote Speaker at the 23rd APCOM Congress (1992), Geostatistics for the Next Century Symposium (1993) and the Fifth International Geostatistics Congress (1996), promotion to the Donald and Donald M. Steel Professor of Earth Sciences at Stanford University (1994); and election as member of the National Academy of Engineering (1998).

== Books ==
- Evaluation of Mineral Reserves: A Simulation Approach. Applied Geostatistics. Oxford University Press. 2004-05-27. ISBN 9780195166941.
- Clayton V. Deutsch, André G. Journel (1998). GSLIB—Geostatistical Software Library and User's Guide. Oxford University Press, New York, second edition, 369p.
- Verly, Georges; David, Michel; Journel, Andre G.; Marechal, Alain (1984). Geostatistics for Natural Resources Characterization. doi:10.1007/978-94-009-3699-7. ISBN 978-94-010-8157-3.
- Journel, André G.; Huijbregts, Charles J. (1978). Mining Geostatistics. Academic Press. ISBN 9780123910561.
