= List of geophysics awards =

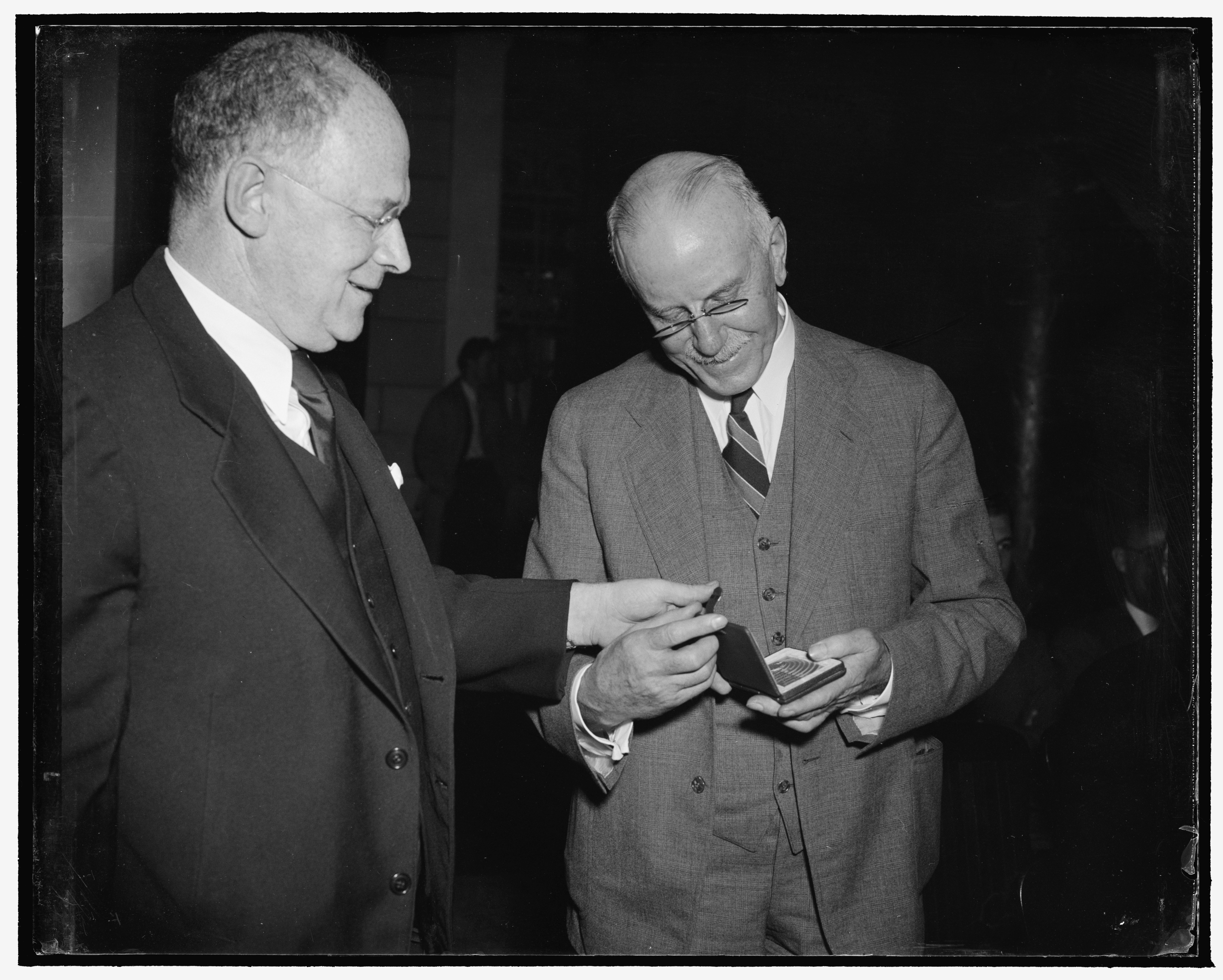
American Geophysical Union presents medal to William Bowie, 1939.

This list of geophysics awards is an index to articles on notable awards for contributions to geophysics, the branch of natural science concerned with the physical processes and physical properties of the Earth and its surrounding space environment, and the use of quantitative methods for their analysis. The list gives the country of the organization that sponsors the award, but the awards are not necessarily limited to people from that country.

== International ==
Award	Sponsor	Notes
Craig J. Beasley Award	Society of Exploration Geophysicists	Given from time to time to a person or organization that has made a meritorious achievement that supports the application of geophysics to a humanitarian, public service, or other socially significant cause
Andrei Borisovich Vistelius Research Award	International Association for Mathematical Geosciences	Young scientist for promising contributions in research in the application of mathematics or informatics in any field of the earth sciences
Felix Chayes Prize	International Association for Mathematical Geosciences	Excellence in research in mathematical petrology
Maurice Ewing Medal	Society of Exploration Geophysicists	SEG’s highest honor, for having made distinguished contributions both to the advancement of the science and to the profession of exploration geophysics
Reginald Fessenden Award	Society of Exploration Geophysicists	To a person who has made a specific technical contribution to exploration geophysics, such as an invention or a theoretical or conceptual advancement, which merits special recognition
Cecil Green Enterprise Award	Society of Exploration Geophysicists	To an individual who has demonstrated courage, ingenuity, and achievement while risking his/her own resources and future in developing a product, service, organization, or activity which is recognized as a distinct and worthy contribution to the petroleum industry
J. Clarence Karcher Award	Society of Exploration Geophysicists	Given in recognition of significant contributions to the science and technology of exploration geophysics by a young geophysicist (<35 years old) of outstanding abilities
Virgil Kauffman Gold Medal Award	Society of Exploration Geophysicists	For having made an outstanding contribution to the advancement of the science of geophysical exploration as manifested during the previous five years. The contribution may be of a technical or a professional nature.
Georges Matheron Lectureship	International Association for Mathematical Geosciences	Proven research ability in the field of spatial statistics or mathematical morphology
John Cedric Griffiths Teaching Award	International Association for Mathematical Geosciences	Outstanding teaching that involves application of mathematics or informatics to the Earth's nonrenewable natural resources or to sedimentary geology
William Christian Krumbein Medal	International Association for Mathematical Geosciences	Distinction in application of mathematics or informatics in the earth sciences, service to the IAMG, and support to professions involved in the earth sciences

== Americas ==
Award	Sponsor	Country	Notes
J. Tuzo Wilson Medal	Canadian Geophysical Union	Canada	Outstanding contribution to the field of geophysics in Canada
Harry H. Hess Medal	American Geophysical Union	United States	To honor outstanding achievements in research of the constitution and evolution of Earth and sister planets
Charles A. Whitten Medal	American Geophysical Union	United States	Outstanding achievement in research on the form and dynamics of the Earth and planets
Guenter Loeser Memorial Award	Air Force Research Laboratory	United States	Outstanding research contribution
Inge Lehmann Medal	American Geophysical Union	United States	Outstanding contributions to the understanding of the structure, composition, and dynamics of the Earth's mantle and core
John Adam Fleming Medal	American Geophysical Union	United States	Original research and technical leadership in geomagnetism, atmospheric electricity, aeronomy, space physics, and related sciences
James B. Macelwane Medal	American Geophysical Union	United States	Early career scientists in the field of Geological and Planetary Sciences
Maurice Ewing Medal	American Geophysical Union	United States	Significant original contributions to the understanding of physical, geophysical, and geological processes in the ocean; to those who advance oceanographic engineering, technology, and instrumentation; and to those who perform outstanding service to the marine sciences
Robert E. Horton Medal	American Geophysical Union	United States	Outstanding contributions to the geophysical aspects of hydrology
Roger Revelle Medal	American Geophysical Union	United States	Outstanding accomplishments or contributions toward the understanding of the Earth's atmospheric processes, including its dynamics, chemistry, and radiation; and toward the role of the atmosphere, atmosphere-ocean coupling, or atmosphere-land coupling in determining the climate, biogeochemical cycles, or other key elements of the climate system
Vetlesen Prize	Lamont–Doherty Earth Observatory, Columbia University, G. Unger Vetlesen Foundation	United States	Scientific achievement resulting in a clearer understanding of the Earth, its history, or its relations to the universe
Waldo E. Smith Award	American Geophysical Union	United States	Individuals who have played unique leadership roles in such diverse areas as scientific associations, education, legislation, research, public understanding of science, management, and philanthropy, and whose accomplishments have greatly strengthened and helped advance the geophysical sciences
Whipple Award	American Geophysical Union	United States	Individual who makes an outstanding contribution to the field of planetary science
William Bowie Medal	American Geophysical Union	United States	Outstanding contributions to fundamental geophysics and for unselfish cooperation in research
William Gilbert Award	American Geophysical Union	United States	Outstanding and unselfish work in magnetism of Earth materials and of the Earth and planets

== Asia ==
Award	Sponsor	Country	Notes
Krishnan Medal	Indian Geophysical Union	India	Outstanding geophysicist/geologist whose age does not exceed 40 years for outstanding work in specific branches of geophysics/geology and related geosciences

== Europe ==
Award	Sponsor	Country	Notes
Alexander von Humboldt Medal	European Geosciences Union	Europe	Research in developing regions for the benefit of people and society through which they have achieved exceptional international standing in geosciences and planetary and space sciences
Arthur Holmes Medal	European Geosciences Union	Europe	Scientists who have achieved exceptional international standing in solid Earth sciences for their contributions and scientific achievements
Bullerwell Lecture	British Geophysical Association	United Kingdom	Significant contribution to the field of geophysics
Chapman Medal	Royal Astronomical Society	United Kingdom	Investigations of outstanding merit in the science of the Sun, space and planetary environments or solar-terrestrial physics
Conrad Schlumberger Award	European Association of Geoscientists and Engineers	Europe	Outstanding contribution over a period of time to the scientific and technical advancement of the geosciences, particularly geophysics
Desiderius Erasmus award	European Association of Geoscientists and Engineers	Europe	Outstanding and lasting achievements in the field of resource exploration and development.
Gold Medal of the Royal Astronomical Society	Royal Astronomical Society	United Kingdom	Achievement in geophysics
Hans Oeschger Medal	European Geosciences Union	Europe	Outstanding achievements in ice research and/or short term climatic changes (past, present, future)
Keith Runcorn Prize	Royal Astronomical Society	United Kingdom	Best British doctoral thesis in geophysics
Louis Néel Medal	European Geosciences Union	Europe	Outstanding contributions in the application of experimental and theoretical methods of solid state physics to the study of earth sciences
Price Medal	Royal Astronomical Society	United Kingdom	Investigations of outstanding merit in solid-earth geophysics, oceanography, or planetary sciences

== See also ==
- Lists of awards
- Lists of science and technology awards
- List of earth sciences awards
