= Frits Agterberg =

Dutch-Canadian geologist (born 1936)

Frederik P. Agterberg (Frits)
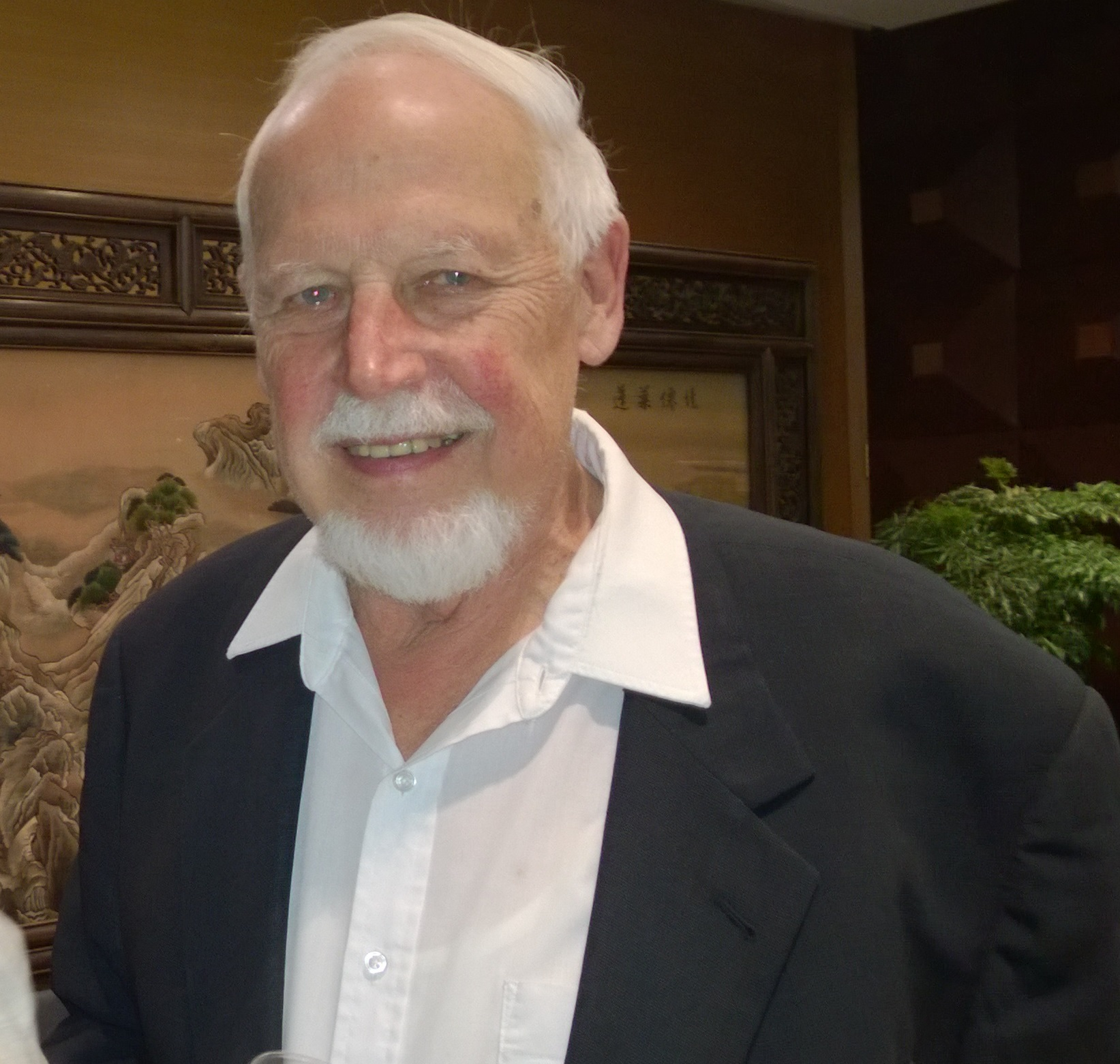
- Agterberg in 2017
- Born: 15 November 1936 (age 89); Utrecht, Netherlands
- Citizenship: Canadian
- Education: Utrecht University; University of Wisconsin–Madison
- Known for: Geomathematics
- Awards: Krumbein Medal; IAMG Distinguished Lectureship
- Scientific career
- Fields: Geostatistics; Mathematical Geology; Geomathematics
- Workplaces: Geological Survey of Canada; University of Ottawa; University of Kansas
- Doctoral advisor: Reinout Willem van Bemmelen

Frederik Pieter Agterberg (born 15 November 1936) is a Dutch-born Canadian mathematical geologist who served at the Geological Survey of Canada. He attended Utrecht University in The Netherlands from 1954 to 1961. He was instrumental in establishing International Association for Mathematical Geosciences. He received William Christian Krumbein Medal in 1978 from International Association for Mathematical Geosciences. In 1981 Agterberg became a correspondent of the Royal Netherlands Academy of Arts and Sciences. In 2004, he was named IAMG Distinguished Lecturer. He was the president of International Association for Mathematical Geosciences from 2004 to 2008. His contribution in Quantitative Stratigraphy in collaboration with Felix M. Gradstein is noteworthy.

== Books ==
- F. P. Agterberg, Geomathematics: Theoretical Foundations, Applications and Future Developments, Volume 18 of Quantitative geology and geostatistics, Springer, 2014, p. 553.
- F.P. Agterberg, Automated Stratigraphic Correlation, Elsevier, 1990, p. 423.
- F. P. Agterberg, "Geomathematics: Mathematical Background and Geo-Science Applications", Elsevier, 1974, 596 pages.
