= Cheng Qiuming =

Chinese mathematical geoscientist

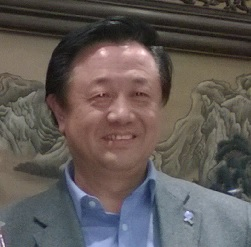
- Cheng in Beijing in 2017
- Born: March 1960 (age 66); Taigu, Shanxi
- Education: University of Ottawa
- Awards: Krumbein Medal
- Scientific career
- Fields: Mineral resources assessment Geostatistics; Geographic Information Systems (GIS); Spatial statistics and fractal modeling Non-linear image processing and pattern recognition Mathematical geology
- Workplaces: China University of Geosciences (Beijing)

Chinese name
- Chinese: 成秋明
Transcriptions
Standard Mandarin
- Hanyu Pinyin: Chéng Qiūmíng

Cheng Qiuming (Chinese: 成秋明; born March 1960) is a Chinese mathematical geoscientist. He is a professor and founding director of the State Key Lab of Geological Processes and Mineral Resources, China University of Geosciences (Beijing). He received the William Christian Krumbein Medal from the International Association for Mathematical Geosciences in 2008 and won the AAG Gold Medal by the international Association of Applied Geochemists in 2020. He was the President of the International Association for Mathematical Geosciences (2012–2016). He is currently the President of the International Union of Geological Sciences (IUGS).
