= John W. Harbaugh =

American geologist (1926–2019)

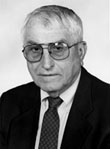
- Professor John W. Harbaugh
- Born: John Warvelle Harbaugh; August 6, 1926; Madison, Wisconsin, U.S.
- Died: July 28, 2019 (aged 92); Santa Barbara, California, U.S.
- Education: University of Wisconsin–Madison; University of Kansas
- Occupation: Academic / Scientist
- Awards: William Christian Krumbein Medal; A.I.Levorsen Memorial Award
- Scientific career
- Fields: Stochastic processes Modeling in geology
- Workplaces: Stanford University
- Website: earth.stanford.edu/john-w-harbaugh

John Warvelle Harbaugh (August 6, 1926 – July 28, 2019) was an American geologist who spent most of his professional career at Stanford University devoted to research on mathematical modeling of dynamic systems, sedimentary basin simulation and oil exploration risk analysis. Since 1999, he was Professor Emeritus both at the Geological and Environmental Sciences Department and at the Energy Resources Engineering Department.

He received numerous honors and awards for his accomplishments and service to the profession that include the Haworth Distinguished Alumni Award of University of Kansas (1968), the A.I. Levorsen Award (1970) from the Pacific Section of the American Association of Petroleum Geologists (AAPG), the Distinguished Service Award also from AAPG (1987), the William Christian Krumbein Medal from International Association for Mathematical Geosciences (1986), and the Distinguished Alumni Award from the University of Wisconsin–Madison (2003). In 2001, his colleagues and friends presented him with a festschrift. In 2013, the International Association for Mathematical Geosciences elected him as Honorary Member.

== Education ==
- Ph.D. in Geology, University of Wisconsin–Madison
- M.S. in Geology, University of Kansas
- B.S. in Geology, University of Kansas

== Books ==
- John W. Harbaugh, John C. Davis, Johannes Wendebourg (1995). Computing Risk for Oil Prospects: Principles and Programs. Pergamon, 452 p.
- John W. Harbaugh, John C. Davis, John Doveton (1977). Probability Methods in Oil Exploration. John Wiley & Sons, 284 p.
- John W. Harbaugh (1975).Northern California Field Guide. Kendall/Hunt Publishing Co., 123 p.
- John W. Harbaugh and Graeme Bonham-Carter (1970). Computer Simulation in Geology. John Wiley & Sons, 575 p.
- John W. Harbaugh and Daniel F. Merriam (1968). Computer Applications in Stratigraphic Analysis. John Wiley & Sons, 282 p.
