= InterPore =

Nonprofit organization of porous media researchers

International Society for Porous Media
- Abbreviation: InterPore
- Formation: 2008; 18 years ago
- Type: Scientific society
- Purpose: Porous material
- Region served: Worldwide
- Members: 48 institutions
- President: Michel Quintard
- Managing Director: Majid Hassanizadeh
- Past-President: Laura Pyrak-Nolte
- Affiliations: International Science Council
- Website: www.interpore.org

The International Society for Porous Media (InterPore) is a nonprofit independent scientific organization established in 2008. It aims to advance and disseminate knowledge for the understanding, description, and modeling of natural and industrial porous medium systems. It acts as a platform for researchers active in modeling of flow and transport in natural, biological, and technical porous media, such as soils, aquifers, oil and gas reservoirs, biological tissues, plants, fuel cells, wood, ceramics, concrete, textiles, paper, polymer composites, hygienic materials, food, foams, membranes, etc.

== History ==
In the course of 2006, researchers from the Department of Earth Sciences, Utrecht University and Institute for Modelling Hydraulic and Environmental Systems, University of Stuttgart, under the leadership of Professor Rainer Helmig and Professor Majid Hassanizadeh, respectively, developed a proposal for setting up a joint international graduate research program. The proposal was submitted to German Research Foundation (DFG) and Netherlands Organisation for Scientific Research (NWO), and was successfully funded. The research school started its activities on January 1, 2007, under the name NUPUS (Non-linearities and Upscaling in PoroUS Media). This project led to the idea of creating an international center for porous media wherein scientists from diverse disciplines who study porous media could exchange ideas and research activities. The European Society for Porous Media (Europore) was established in Spring, 2008. By Summer 2008, the geographical scope was expanded beyond Europe and the name was changed to the International Society for Porous Media (InterPore.) Bylaws were approved and the society was officially registered in Fall 2008.

InterPore Academy was established in 2020 to promote educational activities mainly to serve industrial and/or younger researchers. The academy is organizing short courses, webinars, and workshops.

== National Chapters ==
National chapters are country-wide activity groups of InterPore. They form platforms for bringing together porous media researchers from academia and industry of a given country or region. A variety of activities, such as porous media workshops, conferences, short courses, are organized by national chapters. National chapters compile a list of porous media companies in their countries to be able to interact with institutions and industries.

As of 2021, InterPore has active national chapters in:

- Australia
- Benelux countries
- Brazil
- China
- Colombia
- France
- Germany
- Greece
- India
- Iran
- Israel
- Italy
- Mexico
- Norway
- Saudi Arabia
- Spain
- United Kingdom
- United States (Southern)

== InterPore Annual Meetings ==
InterPore has organized the International Conference on Porous Media annually since 2009. General themes include: fundamentals of porous media; computational challenges in porous media simulation; experimental studies and applications involving porous media. Previous conferences have been hosted by in Fraunhofer ITWM in Kaiserslautern, Germany; Texas A&M University in College Station, Texas, USA; I2M-Dept TREFLE (CNRS, ENSAM, University of Bordeaux), France; Purdue University in West Layfayette, Indiana, USA; Technical University of Prague, Czech Republic; University of Wisconsin, in Milwaukee, USA; University of Padova, Italy; University of Cincinnati, Ohio, USA; Technical University of Delft in Rotterdam, Netherlands; Louisiana State University in New Orleans, USA; Universitat Politecnica de Valencia, Spain; and two online conferences (2020 & 2021.) InterPore2022 is scheduled for May 30 - June 2, 2022 at Khalifa University in Abu Dhabi, UAE.
