= William C. Krumbein =

American geologist (1902–1979)

William Christian Krumbein (January 28, 1902 – August 18, 1979) was a notable geologist, after whom the Krumbein Medal of the International Association for Mathematical Geology (IAMG) was named. This medal was established at the 25th International Geological Congress in Sydney, in 1976. Krumbein was a founding officer of the IAMG.

Krumbein was born at Beaver Falls, Pennsylvania, United States, in January, 1902, and died on August 18, 1979. At his memorial service, it was said of Krumbein "that by constitutionally rejecting conventional wisdom, he continually pursued innovative methods, whereby the natural phenomena of geology could be expressed with mathematical rigor."

The legacy left by Krumbein includes his 'Krumbein Scale', a system of measuring 'roundness' or 'sphericity' of particles and the Krumbein phi (φ) scale, a logarithmic scale used for evaluating particle size that is a modification to the older Wentworth scale.

== Awards ==
1977, awarded the William H. Twenhofel Medal by the Society for Sedimentary Geology

== Notable publications ==
- W. C. Krumbein and F. J. Pettijohn, Manual of sedimentary petrography, New York, Appleton-Century, 1938
- W. C. Krumbein, Measurement and geological significance of shape and roundness of sedimentary particles. Journal of Sedimentary Research; August 1941; v. 11; no. 2; p. 64-72
- W. C. Krumbein and L. L. Sloss, Stratigraphy and sedimentation, San Francisco, W. H. Freeman, 1963
- W.C. Krumbein and F.A. Graybill, An introduction to statistical models in geology, New York, McGraw-Hill, 1965
