= Georges Matheron Lectureship =

- Description: For proven research ability in the field of spatial statistics or mathematical morphology
- Country: International
- Presented by: International Association for Mathematical Geosciences (IAMG)
- First award: 2006
- Website: iamg.org/georges-matheron-lectureship/

The Georges Matheron Lecture Series is sponsored by the International Association for Mathematical Geosciences (IAMG) to honor the legacy of the French engineer Georges François Paul Marie Matheron, known as the founder of geostatistics and a co-founder (together with Jean Serra) of mathematical morphology. The Georges Matheron Lecture was established in 2005 and is given by a scientist with proven research ability in the field of spatial statistics or mathematical morphology. It is presented annually if an eligible and worthy nominee is found. The first recipient of the award was Jean Serra, for a long time a scientists with the Centre of Mathematical Morphology, Fontainebleau. Serra delivered the first lecture at the IAMG conference in Liège, Belgium in 2006. The IAMG Lectures Committee seeks nominations and makes the selection.

== Awardees ==
Name	Country and Institution	Year	Lecture Title
Jean Serra	France, École des Mines	2006	Random Set Modeling
Wynand Kleingeld	South Africa, De Beers	2007	Narrating on a Journey to Solve a Sampling Problem
Adrian Baddeley	Australia, University of Western Australia	2008	Special Point Process Models on Exploration Geology
Jean Laurent-Mallet	France, École Nationale Superieure de Géologie, Nancy Université	2009	GeoChron: A Mathematical Framework for Sedimentary Geology
Donald A Singer	USA, United States Geological Survey	2010	Solving the Wrong Resource Assessment and Exploration Problems Precisely
B. S. Daya Sagar	India, Indian Statistical Institute-Bangalore Centre	2011	Mathematical Morphology in Geomorphology and GISci
Jean Paul Chilès	France, École National Supérieure des Mines de Paris, Fontainebleau	2012	Is There Still Room for New Developments in Geostatistics?
Peter Dowd	Australia, University of Adelaide	2013	Quantifying Uncertainty for Mineral and Energy Resource Exploitation—Sources, Randomness, Scale and Structure
Karl Gerald van den Boogaart	Germany, University of Freiberg	2014	Multiple Point Statistics Understood in Matheronian Principles
Roussos Dimitrakopoulos	Canada, McGill University	2015	Smart(er) Mining Complexes and Mineral Value Chains: A Technological Perspective on Risk Management and Sustainability
Jeffrey Yarus	USA, Landmark Graphics Corporation, Halliburton	2016	The Geostatistical Invasion of the Petroleum Industry; One Perspective from an Applied Geostatistician
Noel Cressie	Australia, University of Wollongong	2017	A Conditional Approach to Multivariate Geostatistics
Christian Lantuéjoul	France, Mines ParisTech	2018	Some Aspects of Geostatistical Simulations
Vera Pawlowsky-Glahn	Spain, University of Girona	2019	Compositional Data in Geostatistics
Marc G. Genton	Saudi Arabia, King Abdullah University of Science and Technology	2020	From Matheron's Theory of Regionalized Variables to Exascale Geostatistics
Not Issued		2021	
Not Issued		2022	
Xavier Emery	Chile, University of Chile	2023	A journey into covariance models for spatial data
Dionissios T. Hristopulos	Greece, Technical University of Crete	2024	From Particles to Patterns: An Odyssey from Physics to Geostatistics and Beyond

== See also ==
- IAMG Distinguished Lectureship
- Bullerwell Lecture
- List of geology awards
- List of geophysics awards
- List of mathematics awards
