= Peter Dowd (academic) =

Peter Alan Dowd (born July 1946 in Australia) is an Australian scientist who is Professor of Mining Engineering at the University of Adelaide.

He was elected a Fellow of the Australian Academy of Technological Sciences and Engineering in 2006, the Royal Academy of Engineering in 1998, the Royal Society of Arts in 1994, and is a fellow or member of numerous other mining-related professional and academic organisations. He was selected to deliver the Georges Matheron Lecture in 2013 by the International Association for Mathematical Geosciences.

== Education ==
- BSc University of New England, 1967
- MSc Ecole Polytechnique de l’Université de Montréal, 1973
- PhD University of Leeds, 1978

== Career ==
After graduating from the University of New England, in 1967 Dowd commenced working as an Operational Research Officer at Zinc Corporation / New Broken Hill Consolidated Ltd. (now Rio Tinto Ltd) at Broken Hill, NSW, Australia. In 1972 he moved to the University of Montreal, and in 1975 to the University of Leeds. From 1975 to 2004 took various academic positions at the University of Leeds, and was appointed Professor in 1992.

In 2005 he moved to Adelaide and has taken various academic positions at the University of Adelaide. He was appointed Professor of mining Engineering in 2013.
