= Geoinformatics =

Application of information science methods in geography and geosciences

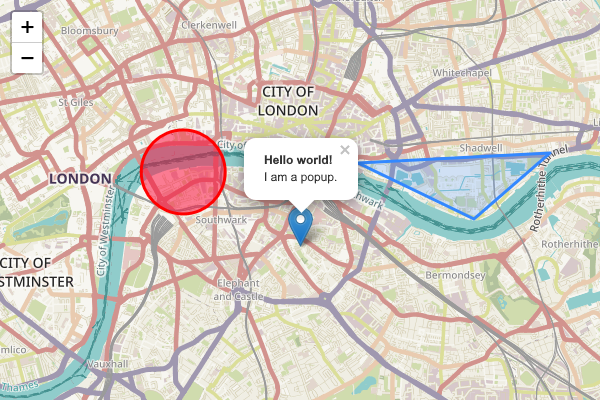
Leaflet library is often used in geoinformatics for the development of web map applications

Geoinformatics is a scientific field primarily within the domains of Computer Science and technical geography. It focuses on the programming of applications, spatial data structures, and the analysis of objects and space-time phenomena related to the surface and underneath of Earth and other celestial bodies. The field develops software and web services to model and analyse spatial data, serving the needs of geosciences and related scientific and engineering disciplines. The term is often used interchangeably with Geomatics, although they are not exactly same. The field of geomatics is a comprehensive discipline encompassing both geodesy and geoinformatics, thus offering a more extensive scope.

== Overview ==
In a general sense, geoinformatics can be understood as "a variety of efforts to promote collaboration between computer scientists and geoscientists to solve complex scientific questions". More technically, geoinformatics has been described as "the science and technology dealing with the structure and character of spatial information, its capture, its classification and qualification, its storage, processing, portrayal and dissemination, including the infrastructure necessary to secure optimal use of this information" or "the art, science or technology dealing with the acquisition, storage, processing production, presentation and dissemination of geoinformation". Along with the thriving of data science and artificial intelligence since the 2010s, the field of geoinformatics has also incorporated the latest methodology and technical progress from the cyberinfrastructure ecosystem.

Geoinformatics has at its core the technologies supporting the processes of acquisition, analysis and visualization of spatial data. Both geomatics and geoinformatics include and rely heavily upon the theory and practical implications of geodesy and cartography. Geography and earth science increasingly rely on digital spatial data acquired from remotely sensed images analyzed by geographical information systems (GIS), photo interpretation of aerial photographs, and Web mining. Geoinformatics combines geospatial analysis and modeling, development of geospatial databases, information systems design, human-computer interaction and both wired and wireless networking technologies. Geoinformatics uses geocomputation and geovisualization for analyzing geoinformation.

Areas related to geoinformatics include:

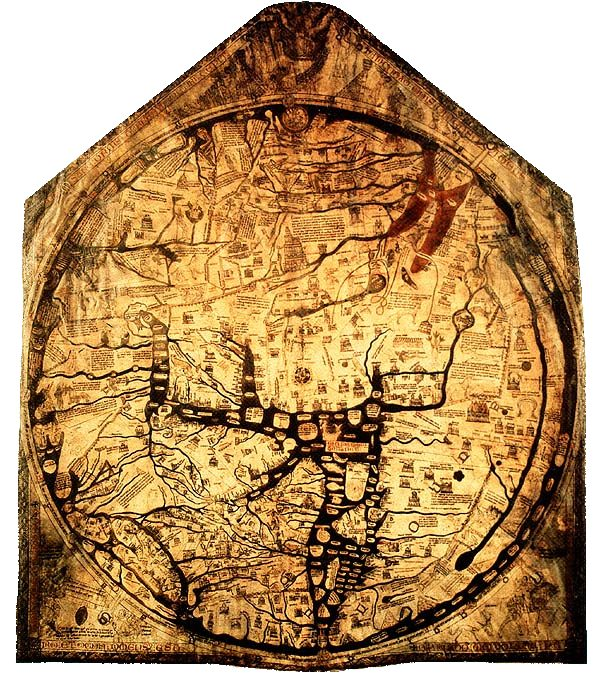
Cartography

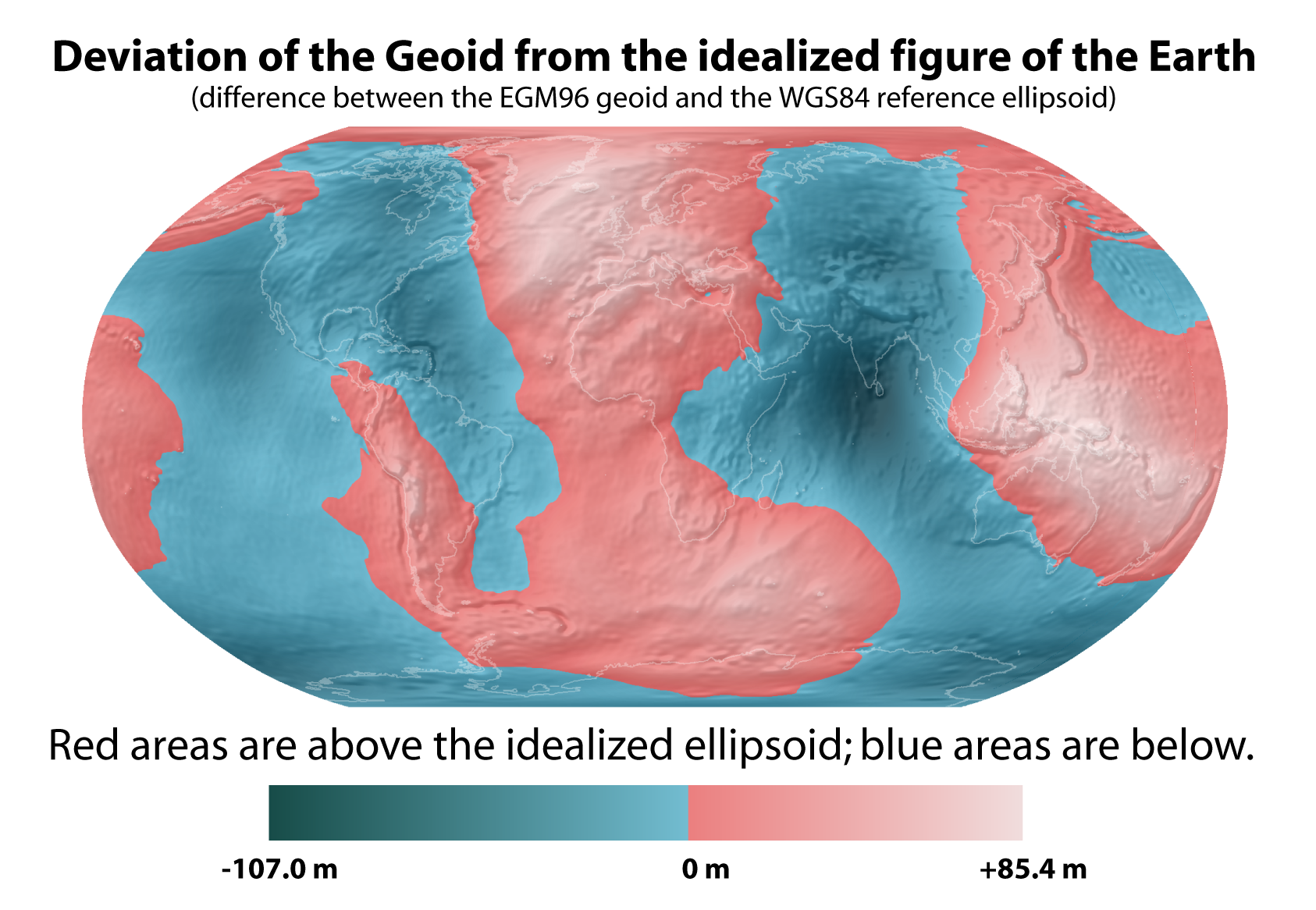
Geodesy

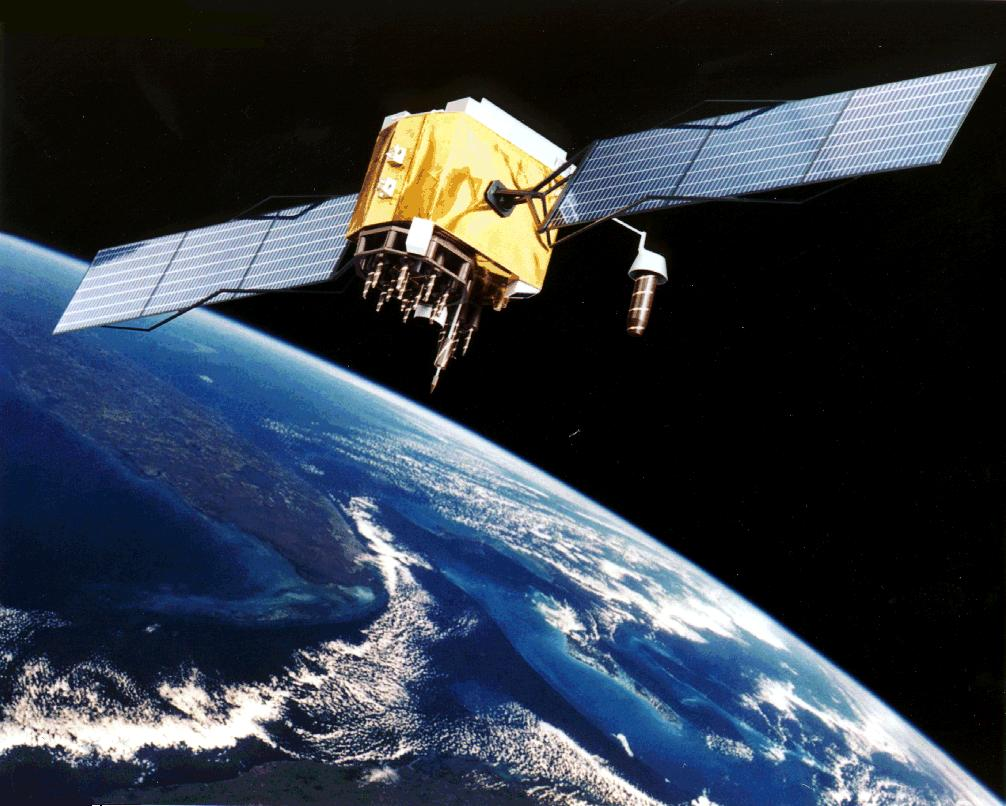
Satellite navigation

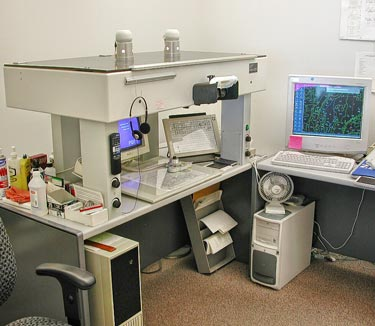
Photogrammetry

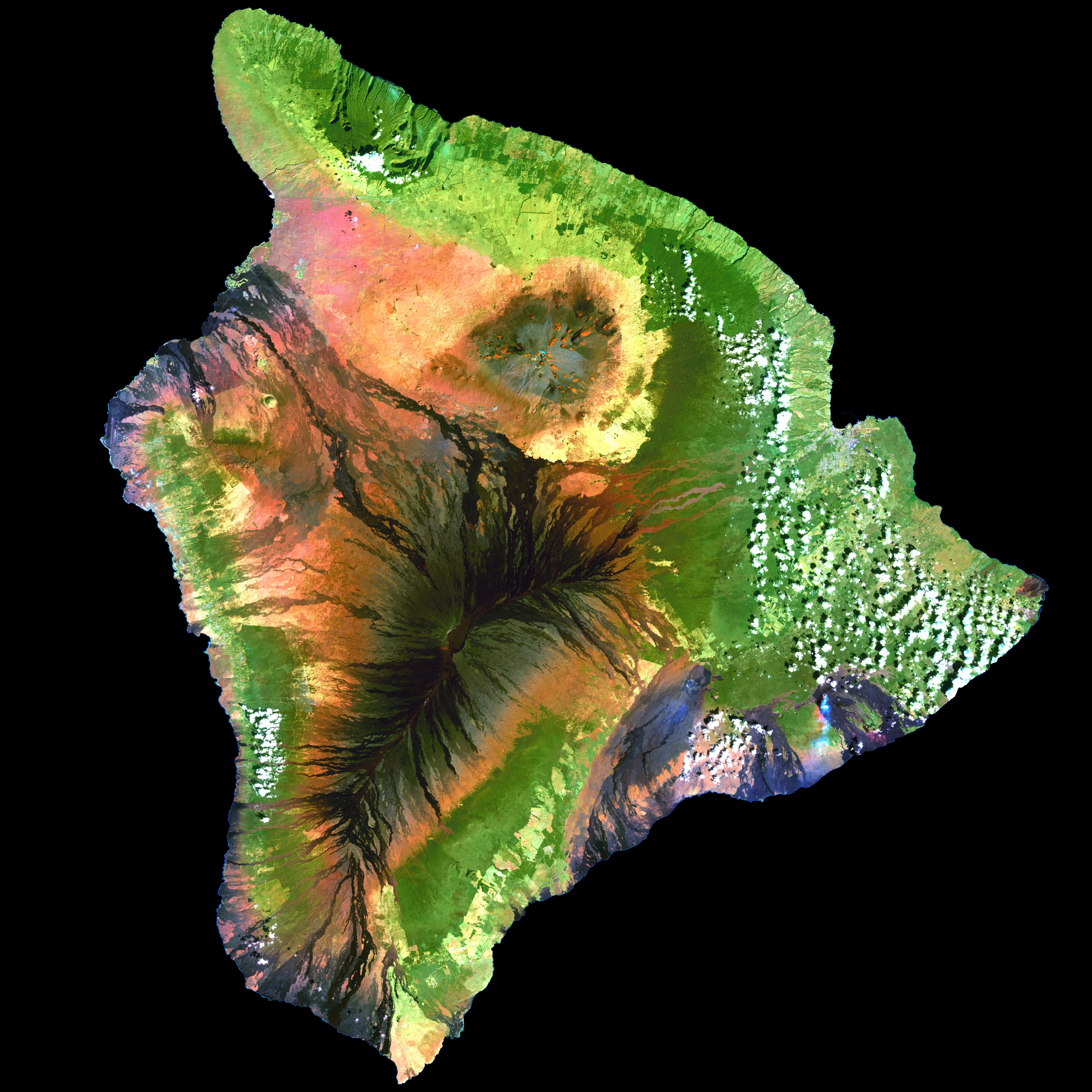
Remote sensing

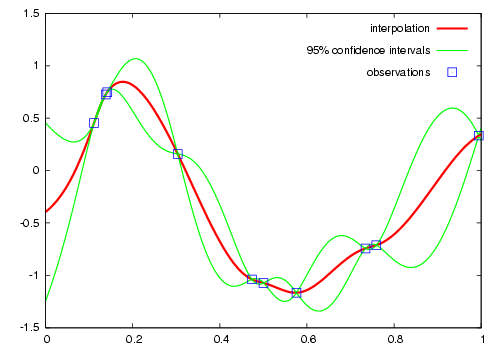
Spatial analysis

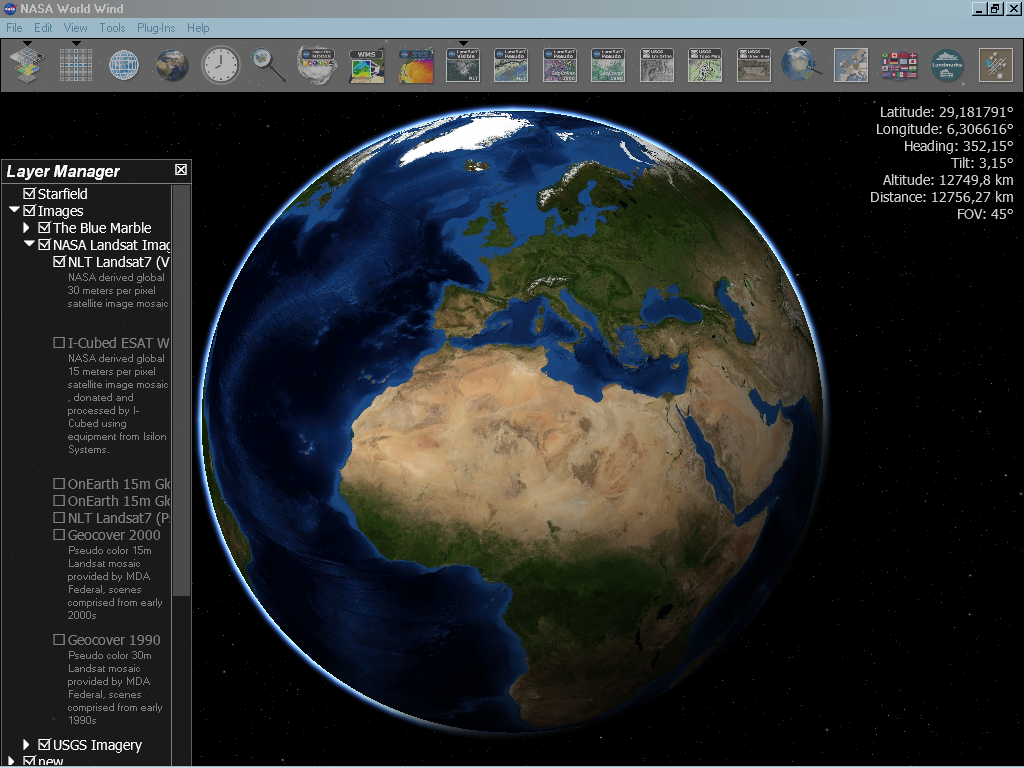
Web mapping

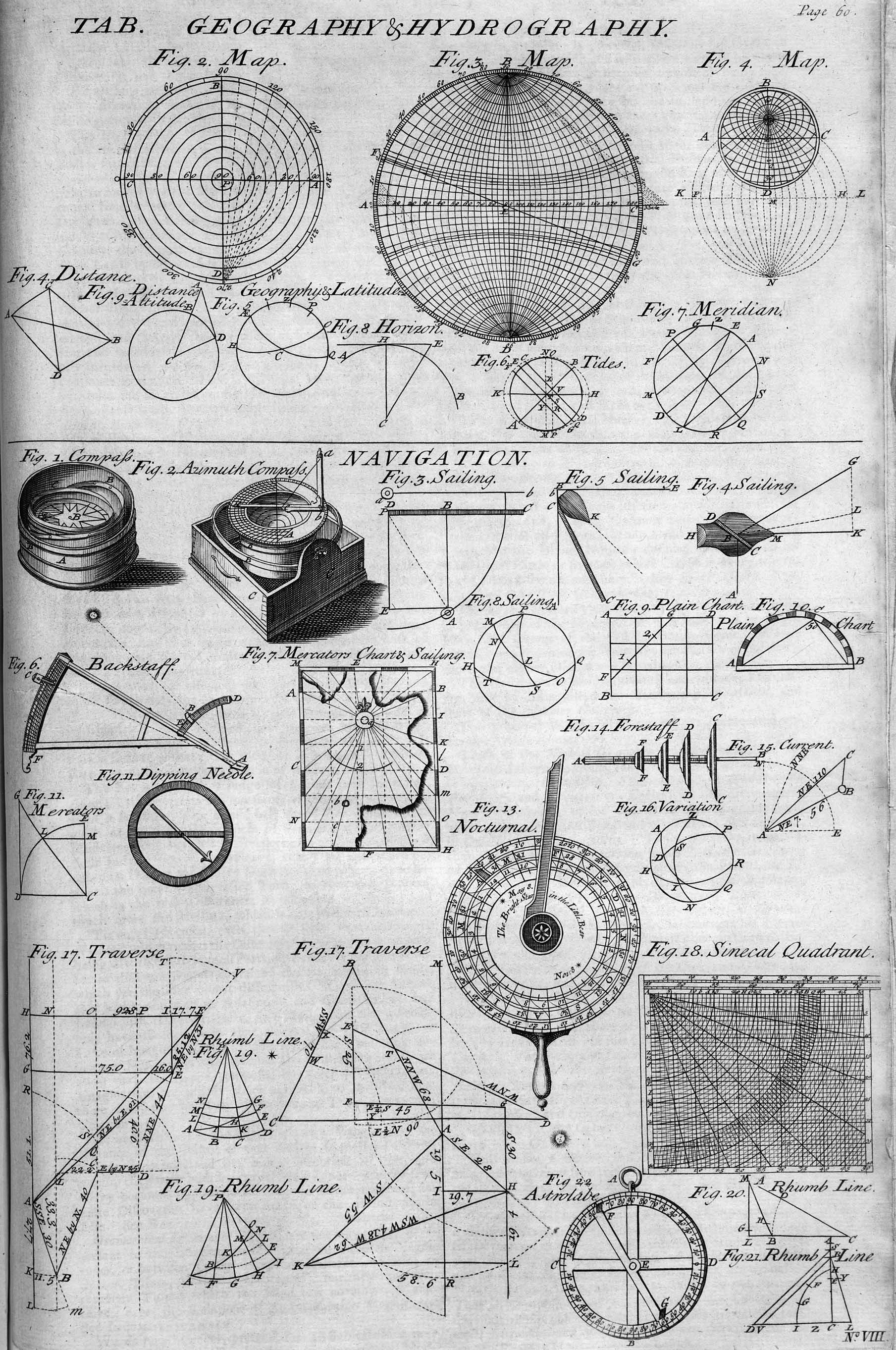
Navigation

== Research ==
Research in this field is used to support global and local environmental, energy and security programs. The Geographic Information Science and Technology group of Oak Ridge National Laboratory is supported by various government departments and agencies including the United States Department of Energy. It is currently the only group in the United States Department of Energy National Laboratory System to focus on advanced theory and application research in this field. A lot of interdisciplinary research exists that involves geoinformatics fields including computer science, information technology, software engineering, biogeography, geography, conservation, architecture, spatial analysis and reinforcement learning.

== Applications ==
Many fields benefit from geoinformatics, including urban planning and land use management, in-car navigation systems, virtual globes, land surveying, public health, local and national gazetteer management, environmental modeling and analysis, military, transport network planning and management, agriculture, meteorology and climate change, oceanography and coupled ocean and atmosphere modelling, business location planning, architecture and archeological reconstruction, telecommunications, criminology and crime simulation, aviation, biodiversity conservation and maritime transport. The importance of the spatial dimension in assessing, monitoring and modelling various issues and problems related to sustainable management of natural resources is recognized all over the world.

Geoinformatics is used in decision-making across many sectors, including government agencies at local, national and international levels, academia and research, emergency services, public health and epidemiology, crime mapping, transportation and infrastructure planning, environmental management, utilities, mineral exploration, seismology, tourism, and market analysis. Many government and non-governmental organizations use spatial data to manage their day-to-day operations.

== See also ==
- Cyberinfrastructure
- Data science
- Informatics
- Geographic information science
- Geomathematics
- Quantitative geography

Organizations

- Earth Science Information Partners
- Open Geospatial Consortium
- American Geophysical Union
- European Geosciences Union
- Geological Society of America
- International Association for Mathematical Geosciences
- International Union of Geodesy and Geophysics
- International Cartographic Association
