= Jennifer McKinley =

Scientist from Northern Ireland, United Kingdom

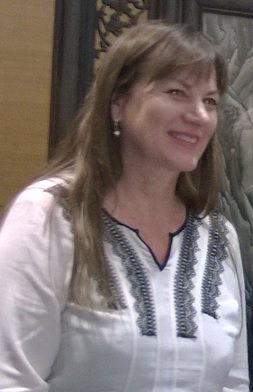
- Jennifer McKinley in Beijing in 2017
- Education: Queen's University Belfast
- Scientific career
- Fields: Geostatistics; Geographic Information Systems (GIS); Forensic Geosciences
- Workplaces: Queen's University Belfast

Jennifer McKinley is a scientist from Northern Ireland, UK. She is currently a Reader at the School of Natural and Built Environment, Queen's University Belfast. Her main areas of research interest include geostatistics, GIS, soil geochemistry, forensics geoscience, weathering. She is the elected president of International Association for Mathematical Geosciences for the period during 2016–2020. She was awarded Chartered Fellow of the Geological Society of London in 2009, a Fellowship awarded competitively.

In May 2024 she resigned as President of the Governing Council of the Chinese Government funded Deep-time Digital Earth (DDE) initiative (source: https://www.iugs.org/dde).

== Education ==
- BSc (Hons) in Geology, 1984, Queen's University Belfast
- PGCE, 1985, Queen's University Belfast
- PhD in Geology, 2001, Queen's University Belfast

== Employment ==
- 2016–Present: Reader, School of Natural and Built Environment, Queen's University Belfast
- 2010 – 2016: Senior Lecturer, School of Geography, Archaeology and Palaeoecology (GAP) Queen's University Belfast
- 2004 – 2010: Lecturer, School of GAP, Queen's University Belfast
- 2001 – 2004: EPSRC Post-doctoral Research Fellow, School of GAP, Queen's University Belfast
- 1995 – 1998: Associate Lecturer, Open University Belfast
- 1985 – 1987: Teacher, Regent House Grammar school, Newtownards, Co Down

== Books ==
- Alastair Ruffell, Jennifer McKinley, "Geoforensics", John Wiley & Sons, 2008, p. 340.
