= Mathematical Geosciences =

- Discipline: Geomathematics, Geosciences, Mathematics
- Language: English
- Former name: Mathematical Geology

Standard abbreviations
- ISO 4: Math. Geosci.

Indexing
- ISSN: 0882-8121 (print); 1573-8868 (web)

Links
- Journal homepage

Mathematical Geosciences (formerly Mathematical Geology) is a scientific journal published semi-quarterly by Springer Science+Business Media on behalf of the International Association for Mathematical Geosciences. It contains original papers in mathematical geosciences. The journal focuses on quantitative methods and studies of the Earth and its natural resources and environment. Its impact factor is 1.909.
