= Kansas Geological Survey =

- KGS
- Established: 1889; 137 years ago
- Research type: Research and service
- Location: 1930 Constant Ave., Lawrence, Kansas, 66047, US
- Operating agency: University of Kansas
- Website: kgs.ku.edu

The Kansas Geological Survey (KGS) is a research and service division of the University of Kansas, charged by statute with studying and providing information on the geologic resources of Kansas. The KGS has no regulatory authority and does not take positions on natural resource issues.

Research at the KGS focuses primarily on energy, water, and the environment and addresses natural resource challenges facing the state of Kansas. The KGS also generates new information about the state's geology and develops tools and techniques for studying the state's surface and subsurface through its geophysics and mapping programs. Primary users of this information include local, State, and Federal agencies; oil and gas exploration companies; engineering companies and geotechnical consultants dealing with construction, environmental, and geologic hazard issues; educators; and private citizens wanting to learn more about the state's geology and resources.

The KGS is located in Lawrence on the west campus of the University of Kansas and has a Well Sample Library in Wichita. With a staff of 74 full-time employees and about 30 student employees, the KGS has an annual state-appropriated budget of approximately $5.9 million. Another $11.7 million in grants and contracts was awarded in fiscal year 2012. The KGS reports to the Vice Chancellor for Research and Graduate Studies at the University of Kansas and has a 12-member advisory council to provide review and guidance.

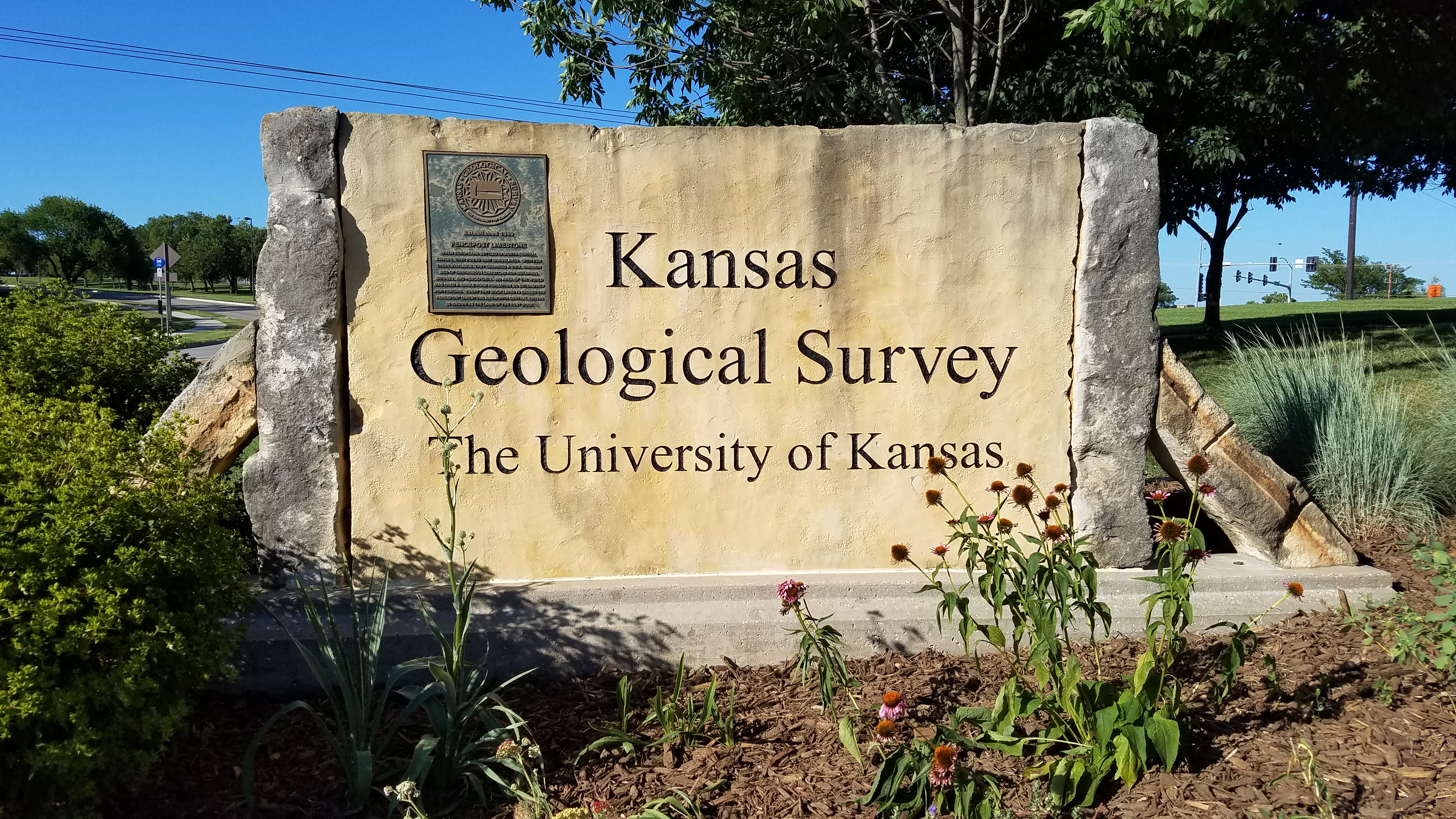
The sign for the Kansas Geological Survey offices in Lawrence, carved from the state's unique Fencepost limestone.

== Energy ==
The KGS, with industry and government partners, continues a multi-year project to test the safety and efficacy of storing carbon dioxide (CO_{2})—from industrial processes and other sources—deep underground and also using it to squeeze out trapped oil unreachable by traditional recovery methods. CO_{2} is a natural and essential component of the atmosphere, but it is also a greenhouse gas—a byproduct of fossil fuels emissions from vehicles and such stationary sources as electric, cement, ethanol, and fertilizer plants—that has been considered a cause of climate change. The KGS-led project has received to date nearly $21.5 million in cooperative agreement funding from the U.S. Department of Energy. This funding has helped support drilling and evaluation of wells in Sumner County south of Wichita, Ellis County north of Hays, and Haskell County northwest of Liberal. The cooperative agreement is the largest ever received by the KGS.

In the summer of 2013, CO_{2} transported from the Abengoa Bioenergy Corporation's ethanol plant near Colwich will be injected at the KGS Wellington field site in Sumner County for both enhanced oil recovery and CO_{2} sequestration in the deep Arbuckle saline aquifer. The Arbuckle is a porous rock group that contains saline water unfit for human consumption in that area of the state and is separated from shallower freshwater aquifers by thousands of feet of impermeable rock. This will be the first time CO_{2} emitted during industrial activities will be captured and injected underground for long-term storage in Kansas. Sequestration of CO_{2} in saline aquifers is being tested throughout the United States, with a larger test currently underway in Illinois.

In response to demand for information on horizontal wells and hydraulic fracturing following increased public awareness and acceleration of horizontal drilling in the Mississippian play in south-central Kansas, the KGS published a circular on hydraulic fracturing in Kansas. The KGS also studies coalbed methane (CBM) and other unconventional sources of natural gas. With funding from the Kansas Corporation Commission and the Kansas Department of Revenue, the KGS continues development of online methods for reporting oil and gas information to the state of Kansas and from the Kansas Geological Society to develop software for the display of digital well logs.

The KGS provides a variety of information related to oil and gas production through the KGS website, the Data Resources Library and Drill Core Library in Lawrence, and the Wichita Well Sample Library, which collects, archives, and loans cuttings samples from more than 130,000 wells drilled in Kansas. Data on Kansas oil and gas production are available through the KGS interactive oil and gas field map. In support of the CO_{2} sequestration and enhanced oil recovery project, the Data Resources Library added a large quantity of new oil and gas records and data to its online database, and the Drill Core Library added important new collections to its inventory.

== Water ==
The KGS "High Plains Aquifer Atlas" is now online. It features more than 70 maps—several animated or interactive. One provides real-time data from wells continuously monitored by the KGS and another allows users to watch the progressive change in water levels since 1996. The High Plains aquifer, a massive network of water-bearing formations that underlies parts of eight states, includes the extensive Ogallala aquifer and is the primary source of municipal, industrial, and irrigation water for much of western and central Kansas. Declines in the High Plains aquifer of western Kansas continue to dominate much of the KGS work on water.

To monitor the condition of the High Plains aquifer, the KGS and the Division of Water Resources (DWR) of the Kansas Department of Agriculture measure groundwater levels, with landowner permission, in about 1,400 wells in 47 western and central Kansas counties every January. The results are available online via the WIZARD database. The KGS also provides a Kansas Master Groundwater Well Inventory (MWI) —a central repository that imports and links together the state's primary groundwater well data sets—and continuously monitors and collects data from three western Kansas wells as part of its index-well program. The KGS releases the real-time data from the index wells through the High Plains Aquifer Atlas.

The KGS recently completed a modeling study of the High Plains aquifer in southwestern Kansas for the area in GMD 3, one of the state's five Groundwater Management Districts. The model is used by Kansas water agencies to assess the impact of pumping reductions on groundwater availability in that portion of the aquifer. The U.S. Department of Energy is funding another KGS project on the integrated use of surface and subsurface nuclear magnetic resonance (NMR) for measuring and mapping saturated hydraulic conductivity in three dimensions. The U.S. Geological Survey helped fund a KGS study on aquifer storage and recovery in near-surface aquifers through the development of a new recharge approach using small-diameter low-cost wells. The KGS also continues work with Michigan State University and others as part of an NSF-funded study to model the entire High Plains aquifer.

A range of water-level and water-well information is available through the KGS website and the Data Resources Library in Lawrence. Inquiries for these data have increased due to ongoing drought conditions in the state and concerns over water-level declines in the High Plains aquifer. With KGS support, the Kansas Department of Health and Environment released a program that allows online submission of digital water-well drilling records.

== Geology ==
The KGS continues to update and create new county geologic maps, supported, in large part, by the U.S. Geological Survey STATEMAP project. New geologic maps are now available for Saline County in central Kansas and Kearny County in the southwest.

A detailed KGS study underway of the stratigraphic architecture of the High Plains aquifer is being funded by a grant from the National Science Foundation (NSF). In particular, the KGS used sonic drilling capabilities to recover unconsolidated core from the Ogallala Formation in Haskell County.

KGS geoarcheological studies include field investigations, funded by KU's endowed Odyssey Archaeological Research Program, at the northwest Kansas Kanorado Locality, the northeast Kansas Coffey site, and other locations thought to harbor pre-Clovis cultural deposits that may date to more than 11,500 before present. Geoarcheology encompasses the investigation and interpretation of sediments, soils, and landforms to help identify areas of potential cultural deposits, date finds, and assess prehistoric environments.

Other KGS research projects in the geology section focus on Cretaceous and Neogene stratigraphy and paleoclimatology of the Great Plains.

== Geophysics ==
The KGS seismic-reflection program addresses engineering and subsidence issues in Kansas and elsewhere. Using seismic reflection techniques, KGS researchers create a vibration—with an explosion or specially equipped truck—that sends seismic (sound) waves into the ground. The rebounding energy, which reflects off different rocks in different ways, is then measured to produce images of underground rock layers.

The U.S. Army Corps of Engineers has awarded the KGS a grant to advance the research and development of an automated subterrain anomaly-detection system using active seismic-imaging (ASI) technologies to be used for clandestine tunnel detection, classification, and evaluation. The KGS also received Corps funding for a study of unconsolidated sediments on the Yuma Proving Grounds in Arizona; U.S. Department of Interior and Bureau of Reclamation funding for a seismic study at A.V. Watkins Dam in Utah; and U.S. Geological Survey funding to study geophysical-methods development for subsurface characterization of near-surface settings.

== Publications, Education, and Information Dissemination ==
The KGS produces printed and online Public Information Circulars (PICs) and other resources, both technical and educational, about KGS research and the state's geology and natural resources.

Recent technical KGS bulletins, published online under the peer-reviewed journal Midcontinent Research. In October 2019, the journal replaced the previous Kansas Geological Survey journal, Current Research in Earth Sciences, which included a work on fusulinids from the Howe Limestone Member in northeastern Kansas by Gregory P. Wahlman and Ronald R. West and another on sequence stratigraphic architecture of the Dakota Formation in Kansas, Nebraska, and Iowa by Greg A. Ludvigson et al.

GeoKansas on the KGS website features online educational information on the rocks, minerals, fossils, and other natural resources in Kansas as well as the location of scenic and geologic places of interest throughout the state. The KGS online photo library provides hundreds of county-by-county photographs of the state's natural resources.

The KGS Data Access and Support Center (DASC) located at the KGS and operating under the direction of the Kansas GIS Policy Board and Kansas GIS Director—serves as the geospatial data clearinghouse for the state of Kansas. The DASC database includes Kansas GIS data on water, energy, and environmental resources. House Bill 2175, passed by the legislature in 2012, directs continued funding to DASC through the KGS. While DASC has been located at the KGS since its inception in 1989, this bill is the first statutory recognition of DASC and its location at the KGS.

The KGS conducts an annual Kansas Field Conference, undertaken since 1995, to provide state legislators, state agency staff, local government officials, business people, and other decision-makers an opportunity to visit different parts of the state and learn about natural resources. Topics on the 2019 trip to south-central Kansas included wetland management at Cheyenne Bottoms Wildlife Area and Quivira National Wildlife Refuge, oil-refining operations, the city of Wichita's Aquifer Storage and Recovery project, cotton ginning, underground waste disposal, salt mining, and wildlife management. Co-sponsors were the KGS; Kansas Department of Wildlife, Parks, and Tourism; Kansas Water Office; Kansas Department of Transportation; Kansas Department of Agriculture; and Kansas Department of Health and Environment. Kansas Field Conference guidebooks are available online.

== See also ==
- Erasmus Haworth, former state geologist and organizer of the Kansas Geological Survey
