= Geomathematics =

Branch of applied mathematics

Diagram of Al-Biruni’s method, involving geometry and surveying, for determining Earth’s radius using the height of a mountain and the dip angle to the horizon. This early application of trigonometry and algebra to geophysical measurement is a foundational example of geomathematics.

Geomathematics (also: mathematical geosciences, mathematical geology, mathematical geophysics) is the application of mathematical methods to solve problems in geosciences, including geology and geophysics, and particularly geodynamics and seismology.

== Applications ==
=== Geophysical fluid dynamics ===
Geophysical fluid dynamics develops the theory of fluid dynamics for the atmosphere, the ocean, and Earth's interior. Applications include geodynamics and the theory of the geodynamo.

=== Geophysical inverse theory ===
Geophysical inverse theory is concerned with analyzing geophysical data to get model parameters. It is concerned with the question: What can be known about the Earth's interior from measurements on the surface? Generally there are limits on what can be known even in the ideal limit of exact data.

The goal of inverse theory is to determine the spatial distribution of some variable (for example, density or seismic wave velocity). The distribution determines the values of an observable at the surface (for example, gravitational acceleration for density). There must be a forward model predicting the surface observations given the distribution of this variable.

Applications include geomagnetism, magnetotellurics and seismology.

=== Fractals and complexity ===
Many geophysical data sets have spectra that follow a power law, meaning that the frequency of an observed magnitude varies as some power of the magnitude. An example is the distribution of earthquake magnitudes; small earthquakes are far more common than large earthquakes. This is often an indicator that the data sets have an underlying fractal geometry. Fractal sets have a number of common features, including structure at many scales, irregularity, and self-similarity (they can be split into parts that look much like the whole). The manner in which these sets can be divided determine the Hausdorff dimension of the set, which is generally different from the more familiar topological dimension. Fractal phenomena are associated with chaos, self-organized criticality and turbulence. Fractal Models in the Earth Sciences by Gabor Korvin was one of the earlier books on the application of Fractals in the Earth Sciences.

=== Data assimilation ===
Data assimilation combines numerical models of geophysical systems with observations that may be irregular in space and time. Many of the applications involve geophysical fluid dynamics. Fluid dynamic models are governed by a set of partial differential equations. For these equations to make good predictions, accurate initial conditions are needed. However, often the initial conditions are not very well known. Data assimilation methods allow the models to incorporate later observations to improve the initial conditions. Data assimilation plays an increasingly important role in weather forecasting.

=== Geophysical statistics ===
Some statistical problems come under the heading of mathematical geophysics, including model validation and quantifying uncertainty.

=== Terrestrial Tomography ===
An important research area that utilises inverse methods is seismic tomography, a technique for imaging the subsurface of the Earth using seismic waves. Traditionally seismic waves produced by earthquakes or anthropogenic seismic sources (e.g., explosives, marine air guns) were used.

=== Crystallography ===
Crystallography is one of the traditional areas of geology that use mathematics. Crystallographers make use of linear algebra by using the Metrical Matrix. The Metrical Matrix uses the basis vectors of the unit cell dimensions to find the volume of a unit cell, d-spacings, the angle between two planes, the angle between atoms, and the bond length. Miller's Index is also helpful in the application of the Metrical Matrix. Brag's equation is also useful when using an electron microscope to be able to show relationship between light diffraction angles, wavelength, and the d-spacings within a sample.

=== Geophysics ===
Geophysics is one of the most math heavy disciplines of Earth Science. There are many applications which include gravity, magnetic, seismic, electric, electromagnetic, resistivity, radioactivity, induced polarization, and well logging. Gravity and magnetic methods share similar characteristics because they're measuring small changes in the gravitational field based on the density of the rocks in that area. While similar gravity fields tend to be more uniform and smooth compared to magnetic fields. Gravity is used often for oil exploration and seismic can also be used, but it is often significantly more expensive. Seismic is used more than most geophysics techniques because of its ability to penetrate, its resolution, and its accuracy.

=== Geomorphology ===
Many applications of mathematics in geomorphology are related to water. In the soil aspect things like Darcy's law, Stokes' law, and porosity are used.

- Darcy's law is used when one has a saturated soil that is uniform to describe how fluid flows through that medium. This type of work would fall under hydrogeology.
- Stokes' law measures how quickly different sized particles will settle out of a fluid. This is used when doing pipette analysis of soils to find the percentage sand vs silt vs clay. A potential error is it assumes perfectly spherical particles which don't exist.
- Stream power is used to find the ability of a river to incise into the river bed. This is applicable to see where a river is likely to fail and change course or when looking at the damage of losing stream sediments on a river system (like downstream of a dam).
- Differential equations can be used in multiple areas of geomorphology including: The exponential growth equation, distribution of sedimentary rocks, diffusion of gas through rocks, and crenulation cleavages.

=== Glaciology ===
Mathematics in Glaciology consists of theoretical, experimental, and modeling. It usually covers glaciers, sea ice, waterflow, and the land under the glacier.

Polycrystalline ice deforms slower than single crystalline ice, due to the stress being on the basal planes that are already blocked by other ice crystals. It can be mathematically modeled with Hooke's law to show the elastic characteristics while using Lamé constants. Generally the ice has its linear elasticity constants averaged over one dimension of space to simplify the equations while still maintaining accuracy.

Viscoelastic polycrystalline ice is considered to have low amounts of stress usually below one bar. This type of ice system is where one would test for creep or vibrations from the tension on the ice. One of the more important equations to this area of study is called the relaxation function. Where it's a stress-strain relationship independent of time. This area is usually applied to transportation or building onto floating ice.

Shallow-Ice approximation is useful for glaciers that have variable thickness, with a small amount of stress and variable velocity. One of the main goals of the mathematical work is to be able to predict the stress and velocity. Which can be affected by changes in the properties of the ice and temperature. This is an area in which the basal shear-stress formula can be used.

== Academic journals ==
- International Journal on Geomathematics
- Mathematical Geosciences

== See also ==
- Geocomputation
- Geoinformatics
- International Association for Mathematical Geosciences (IAMG)
