= International Association for Mathematical Geosciences =

- Logo
- Abbreviation: IAMG
- Formation: 1968
- Type: Scientific society
- Legal status: Non-profit
- Purpose: Mathematics, Statistics, Informatics in the Geosciences
- Headquarters: 5868 Westheimer Rd. # 537, Houston, TX 77057, U.S.A
- Region served: Worldwide
- Members: ca. 800 individuals
- President: Peter Dowd (academic)
- Main organ: Journal of Mathematical Geosciences
- Website: www.iamg.org

The International Association for Mathematical Geosciences (IAMG) is a nonprofit organization of geoscientists. It aims to promote international cooperation in the application and use of mathematics in geological research and technology. IAMG's activities are to organize meetings, issue of publications on the application of mathematics in the geological sciences, extend cooperation with other organizations professionally concerned with applications of mathematics and statistics to the biological sciences, earth sciences, engineering, environmental sciences, and planetary sciences. IAMG is a not for profit 501(c)(3) organization.

== History ==
The IAMG was established in August 1968 at the International Geological Congress in Prague, Czechoslovakia.

== Publications ==
IAMG publishes a semiannual Newsletter and the following scientific journals:

- Computers & Geosciences
- Mathematical Geosciences
- Natural Resources Research
- Applied Computing and Geosciences

It also publices a monograph series, Studies in Mathematical Geosciences.

== Presidents ==
Presidents of the International Association for Mathematical Geosciences (IAMG) include:

- Peter Dowd (academic) (Australia) (2020-2024)
- Jennifer McKinley (N. Ireland) (2016-2020)
- Qiuming Cheng (Canada and China) (2012-2016)
- Vera Pawlowsky-Glahn (Spain) (2008-2012)
- Frits P. Agterberg (Canada) (2004-2008)
- Graeme Bonham-Carter (Canada) (2000-2004)
- Ricardo A. Olea (USA) (1996-2000)
- Michael Ed. Hohn (USA) (1992-1996)
- Richard B. McCammon (USA) (1989-1992)
- John C. Davis (USA) (1984-1989)
- E. H. Timothy Whitten (USA) (1980-1984)
- Daniel F. Merriam (USA) (1976-1980)
- Richard Reyment (Sweden) (1972-1976)
- Andrei B. Vistelius (USSR) (1968-1972)

== Recognition ==
The IAMG offers medals, lectureships, prizes, and awards.

=== Medal(s) ===
- William Christian Krumbein Medal (established in 1976), is named after William Christian Krumbein. It is awarded to senior scientists for career achievement, which includes distinction in application of mathematics or informatics in the earth sciences, service to the IAMG, and support to professions involved in the earth sciences.

=== Special Lectureships ===
- The Georges Matheron Lectureship (established 2006), named after Georges Matheron, a leader in the field of geostatistics. The Lectures Committee seeks nominations and selects each year a Georges Matheron Lecturer who is a scientist with proven research ability in the field of spatial statistics or mathematical morphology.
- The IAMG Distinguished Lectureship is awarded once in every two years. The purpose of the IAMG Distinguished Lecture series is to demonstrate to the broader geological community the power of mathematical geology to address routine geological interpretation and to deliver this knowledge to audiences in selected parts the world.

=== Prize(s) ===
- Felix Chayes Prize for Excellence in Research in Mathematical Petrology is a cash prize endowed in honor of Felix Chayes that is given to recipients of exceptional potential and proven research ability. The prize is given for outstanding contributions to statistical petrology or related applications of mathematics or informatics.

=== Awards ===
- The John Cedric Griffiths Teaching Award is presented to honor outstanding teaching, especially for teaching that involves application of mathematics or informatics to the Earth's nonrenewable natural resources or to sedimentary geology.
- The Andrei Borisovich Vistelius Research Award is given to a young scientist for promising contributions in research in the application of mathematics or informatics in any field of the earth sciences. A recipient should be 35 years or younger at the end of the calendar year for which he or she has been selected for the award.
- The Founders Scholarship shall be presented annually to an outstanding undergraduate, Masters, or Ph.D. student, or a student with equivalent qualifications. This scholarship will be given in honor or memory of individuals who participated in the founding of IAMG in1968 at the 23rd International Geologic Congress in Prague and who subsequently gave significant service to the Association.

=== IAMG Certificate of Appreciation ===
A Special Merit Certificate is given to those individuals who did exceptional work on behalf of IAMG that is beyond normal expectations. The recipients of this honor include:

- Cora Edith Cowan (1999)
- Richard Reyment (2002)
- Kathryn MacKinnon (2005)
- JoAnne DeGraffenreid (2015)
- B. S. Daya Sagar (2018)
- Shuyun Xie (2021)

=== Honorary IAMG Membership ===
The IAMG confers honorary life membership on those individuals who have served the organization "beyond the call of duty". The recipients of this honor include:

- Daniel F. Merriam (2005 - 2017)
- Richard Reyment (2008 - 2016)
- Danie G. Krige (2009 - 2013)
- Walther Schwarzacher (2010)
- Zhao Pengda (2011)
- Jean Serra (2012)
- John W. Harbaugh (2013)
- Jorgina Ross (2014)
- John Tipper (2014)
- Frederik P. Agterberg (2017)

== See also ==
- American Geophysical Union
- List of geoscience organizations
- Geomathematics
- Geoinformatics
