= Jean Serra =

French mathematician and engineer

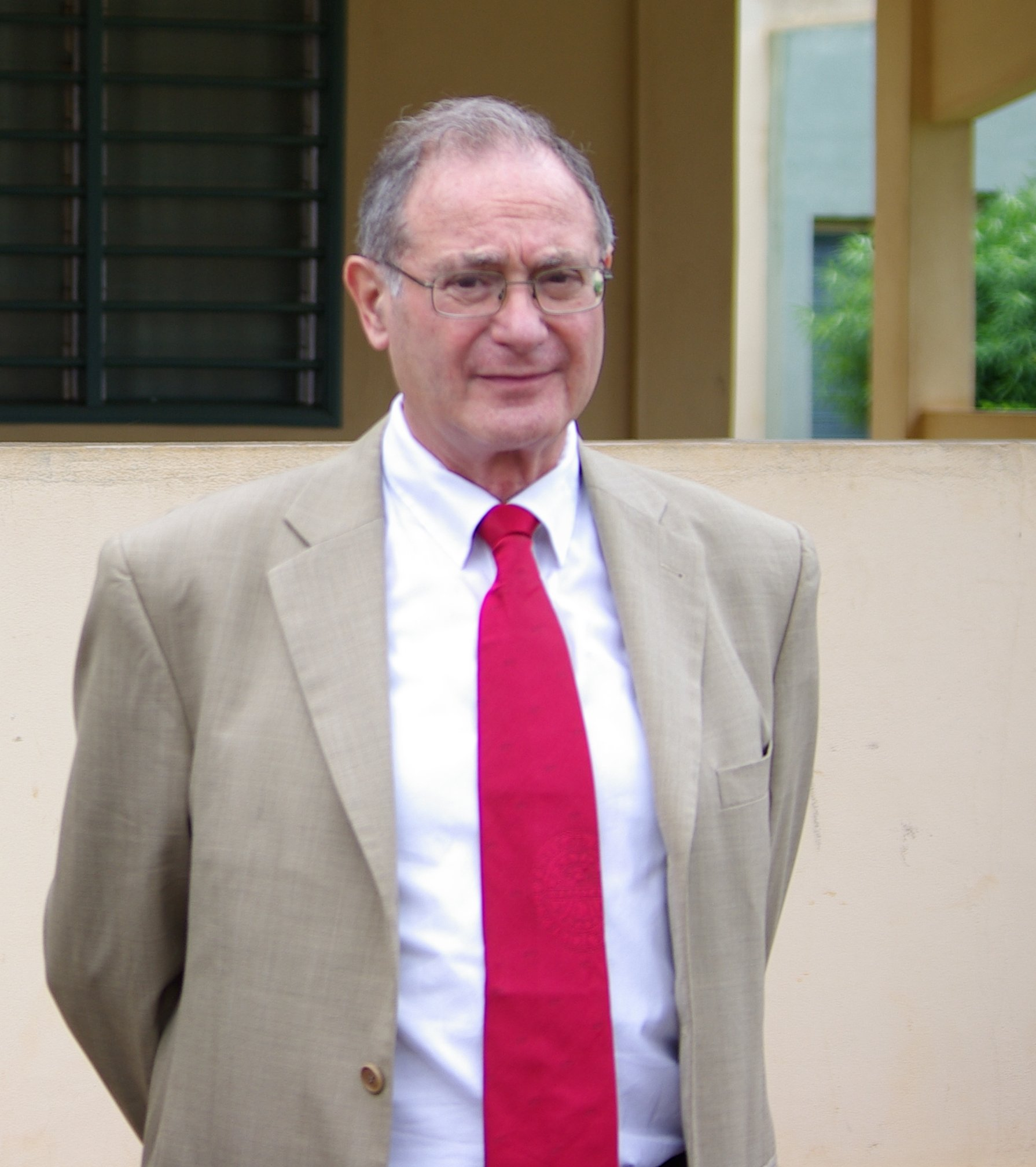
- Jean Serra in 2007
- Born: 1940 (age 85–86); Algeria
- Citizenship: France
- Known for: co-founding Mathematical morphology
- Awards: Georges Matheron Lectureship 2006
- Scientific career
- Fields: Mathematics, geology
- Workplaces: Centre de Morphologie Mathématique, École des Mines de Paris

Jean Paul Frédéric Serra (born 1940 in Algeria) is a French mathematician and engineer, and known as one of the co-founders (together with Georges Matheron) of mathematical morphology.

== Biography ==
=== Education ===
Serra received a scientific baccalauréat in 1957, and an engineering degree from the École Nationale Supérieure des Mines de Nancy in 1962. He also obtained a Bachelor's degree in philosophy/psychology, from the University of Nancy, in 1965. He obtained a PhD in Mathematical Geology from the University of Nancy in 1967, and a doctorat d'etat in Mathematics, from the Pierre and Marie Curie University, Paris, in 1986. He speaks French, Russian, English, and Spanish.

=== Mathematical morphology ===
From 1962 to 1966, while a research engineer at the Institut de recherche de la sidérurgie, France, Serra was a PhD student under the supervision of Georges Matheron. The subject of his thesis was "stochastic modeling of the iron deposit of Lorraine, at various scales," one of the goals of which was to quantify petrographic characteristics of its iron orebody. During that period, Serra came up with the idea of using structuring elements for transforming images of cross sections of the ore, in order to gain information about it. The result was a device called "Texture Analyser", which was patented in 1965. This work also lead to the concept of hit-or-miss transform, which evolved into the concepts of erosion, dilation, opening and closing due to Matheron. Granulometry and other concepts followed. In the Winter of 1966, in a pub of Nancy, Matheron, Philippe Formery, and Serra decided to give a name to this body of works: "Mathematical morphology". The new theory and method has since evolved to be applied in a variety of image processing problems and tasks, and is researched worldwide (main article: Mathematical morphology).

In 1968, the Centre of Mathematical Morphology (CMM) of the École des Mines de Paris was created (after 1979, it was called Centre of Geostatistics and Mathematical Morphology). Matheron was named director, and Serra was hired as master of research ("Maître de Recherches") and assistant director. In 1986, upon the split of the Centre of Geostatistics and Mathematical Morphology into two separate centers, Serra became director of research ("Directeur de Recherches") and the director of the new CMM.

Serra has continued to contribute to mathematical morphology over the years; In fact, some of the most important theoretical developments are due to him:

- Generalization of mathematical morphology to complete lattices
- Theory for morphological filtering, with Matheron
- Connections

=== Additional highlights ===
- 1979–1983: Vice-president of the International Society for Stereology.
- 1983–: Member of the editorial board of Acta Stereologica.
- 1988–1991: Member of the scientific board of the French T.V. cultural program.
- 1989–: Member of the editorial board of the Journal of Visual Communication and Image Representation.
- 1990–: Member of the editorial board of the Journal of Mathematical Imaging and Vision.
- 1991–1993 : Chairman of the "Image Algebra and Morphological Processing Conference" in SPIE annual meeting, San Diego, California, USA.
- 1993: Chairman of the first Int. Conf. in Mathematical Morphology, Barcelona, Spain.
- 1994: Chairman of the second Int. Conf. in Mathematical Morphology, Fontainebleau, France.

== Honors and awards ==
- 1982 : ESCLANGON prize, awarded by the French Society of Physics.
- 1988 : First award of the great prize of the AFCET Society.
- 1989 : Chevalier of the National Order of Merit.
- 1993 : Doctor Honoris Causa of the Autonomous University of Barcelona, Spain.
- 1993 : Founder of the International Society for Mathematical Morphology, and first president of this society.
- 2006 : First recipient of Georges Matheron Lectureship Award of International Association for Mathematical Geosciences

== Main publications ==
- Image Analysis and Mathematical Morphology, ISBN 0-12-637240-3 (1982)
- Image Analysis and Mathematical Morphology, Volume 2: Theoretical Advances, ISBN 0-12-637241-1 (1988)
