= Morphological skeleton =

In digital image processing, morphological skeleton is a skeleton (or medial axis) representation of a shape or binary image, computed by means of morphological operators.

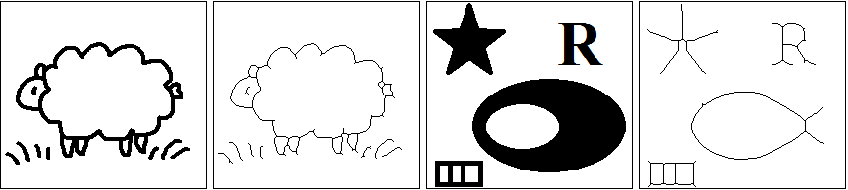
Examples of skeleton extraction of figures in the binary image

Morphological skeletons are of two kinds:

- Those defined by means of morphological openings, from which the original shape can be reconstructed,
- Those computed by means of the hit-or-miss transform, which preserve the shape's topology.

== Skeleton by openings ==
=== Lantuéjoul's formula ===
==== Continuous images ====
In (Lantuéjoul 1977), Lantuéjoul derived the following morphological formula for the skeleton of a continuous binary image $X\subset \mathbb{R}^2$:

$$S(X)=\bigcup_{\rho >0}\bigcap_{\mu >0}\left[(X\ominus \rho B)-(X\ominus \rho B)\circ \mu \overline B\right]$$,

where $\ominus$ and $\circ$ are the morphological erosion and opening, respectively, $\rho B$ is an open ball of radius $\rho$, and $\overline B$ is the closure of $B$.

==== Discrete images ====
Let $\{nB\}$, $n=0,1,\ldots$, be a family of shapes, where B is a structuring element,

$nB=\underbrace{B\oplus\cdots\oplus B}_{n\mbox{ times}}$, and
$0B=\{o\}$, where o denotes the origin.

The variable n is called the size of the structuring element.

Lantuéjoul's formula has been discretized as follows. For a discrete binary image $X\subset \mathbb{Z}^2$, the skeleton S(X) is the union of the skeleton subsets $\{S_n(X)\}$, $n=0,1,\ldots,N$, where:

$$S_n(X)=(X\ominus nB)-(X\ominus nB)\circ B$$.

==== Reconstruction from the skeleton ====
The original shape X can be reconstructed from the set of skeleton subsets $\{S_n(X)\}$ as follows:

$$X=\bigcup_n (S_n(X)\oplus nB)$$.

Partial reconstructions can also be performed, leading to opened versions of the original shape:

$$\bigcup_{n\geq m} (S_n(X)\oplus nB)=X\circ mB$$.

==== The skeleton as the centers of the maximal disks ====
Let $nB_z$ be the translated version of $nB$ to the point z, that is, $nB_z=\{x\in E| x-z\in nB\}$.

A shape $nB_z$ centered at z is called a maximal disk in a set A when:

- $nB_z\in A$, and
- if, for some integer m and some point y, $nB_z\subseteq mB_y$, then $mB_y\not\subseteq A$.

Each skeleton subset $S_n(X)$ consists of the centers of all maximal disks of size n.

== Performing Morphological Skeletonization on Images ==
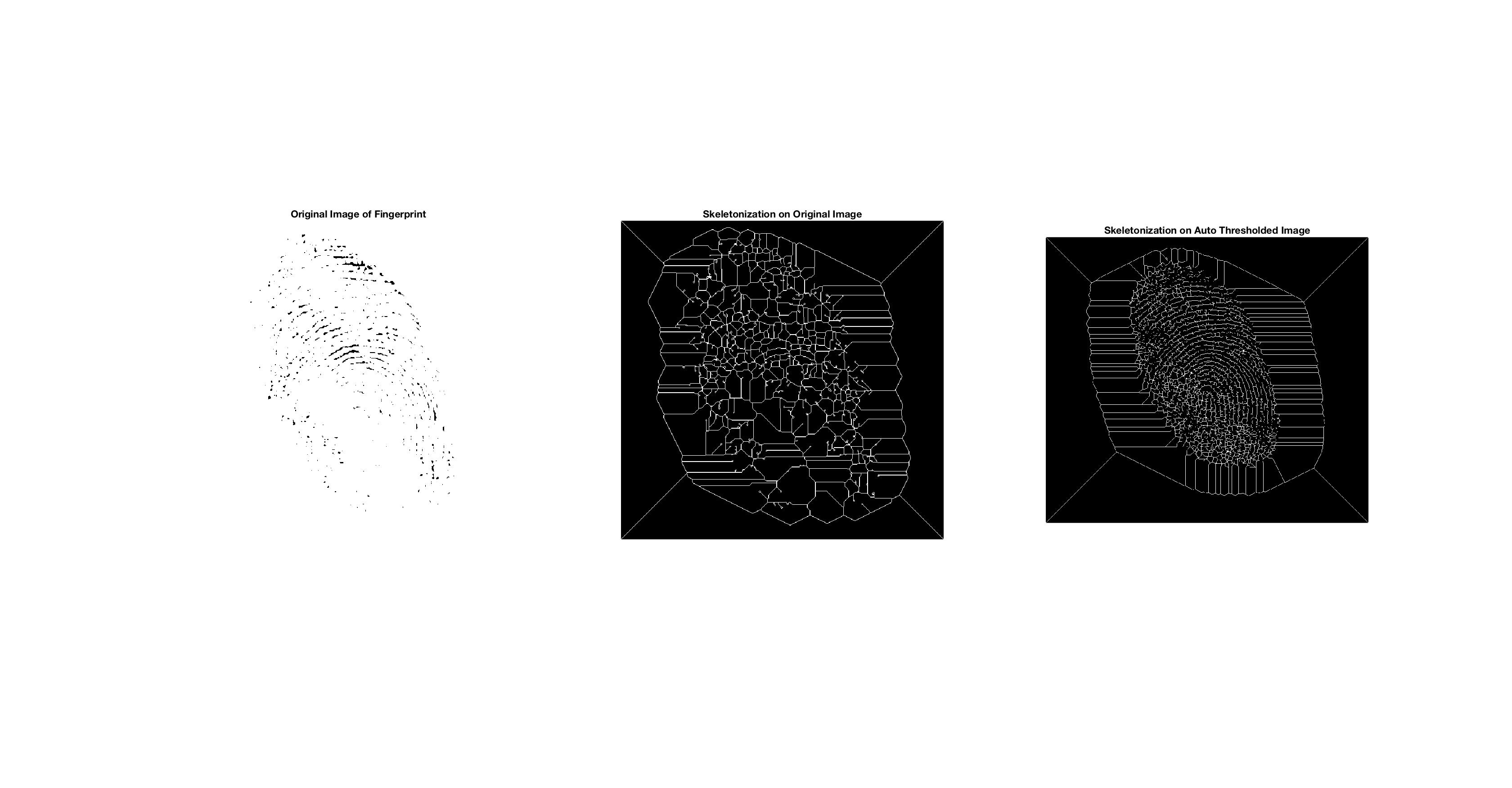
Skeleton image of fingerprint operated on by Matlab. Original, unaltered image is on the left. The middle image has generated using bwmorph(Matlab) without preprocessing. The rightmost image, was preprocessed using Automatic Thresholding to increase contrast and skeleton was generated using bwmorph

Morphological Skeletonization can be considered as a controlled erosion process. This involves shrinking the image until the area of interest is 1 pixel wide. This can allow quick and accurate image processing on an otherwise large and memory intensive operation. A great example of using skeletonization on an image is processing fingerprints. This can be quickly accomplished using bwmorph; a built-in Matlab function which will implement the Skeletonization Morphology technique to the image.

The image to the right shows the extent of what skeleton morphology can accomplish. Given a partial image, it is possible to extract a much fuller picture. Properly pre-processing the image with a simple Auto Threshold grayscale to binary converter will give the skeletonization function an easier time thinning. The higher contrast ratio will allow the lines to joined in a more accurate manner. Allowing to properly reconstruct the fingerprint.

skelIm = bwmorph(orIm,'skel',Inf); %Function used to generate Skeletonization Images 
