= Georges Matheron =

Mathematician and civil engineer

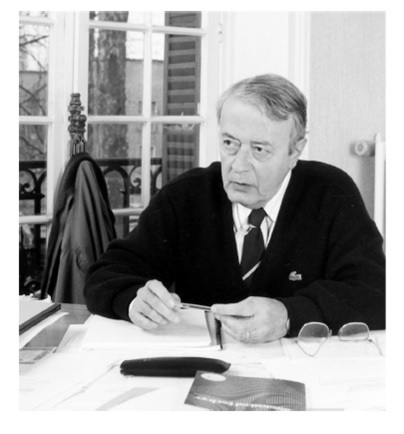
- Matheron in 1998
- Born: Georges François Paul Marie Matheron; 2 December 1930
- Died: 7 August 2000 (aged 69)
- Awards: Krumbein Medal, (1983), declined
- Scientific career
- Fields: Mathematics civil engineer of mines
- Doctoral advisor: Paul Lévy
- Doctoral students: Margaret Armstrong; Jean Serra

Georges François Paul Marie Matheron (2 December 1930 – 7 August 2000) was a French mathematician and civil engineer of mines, known as the founder of geostatistics and a co-founder (together with Jean Serra) of mathematical morphology. In 1968, he created the Centre de Géostatistique et de Morphologie Mathématique at the Paris School of Mines in Fontainebleau. He is known for his contributions on Kriging and mathematical morphology. His seminal work is posted for study and review to the Online Library of the Centre de Géostatistique, Fontainebleau, France.

== Early career ==
Matheron graduated from École Polytechnique and later Ecole des Mines de Paris, where he studied mathematics, physics and probability theory (as a student of Paul Lévy).

From 1954 to 1963, he worked with the French Geological Survey in Algeria and France, and was influenced by the works of Krige, Sichel, and de Wijs, from the South African school, on the gold deposits of the Witwatersrand. This influence led him to develop the major concepts of the theory for estimating resources he named Geostatistics.

== Geostatistics ==
Matheron’s [Formule des Minerais Connexes] became his Note Statistique No 1. In this paper of 25 November 1954, Matheron derived the degree of associative dependence between lead and silver grades of core samples. In his Rectificatif of 13 January 1955, he revised the arithmetic mean lead and silver grades because his core samples varied in length. He did derive the length-weighted average lead and silver grades but failed to derive the variances of his weighted averages. Neither did he derive the degree of associative dependence between metal grades of ordered core samples as a measure for spatial dependence between ordered core samples. He did not disclose his primary data set and worked mostly with symbols rather than real measured values such test results for lead and silver in Matheron's core samples. Matheron's Interprétations des corrélations entre variables aléatoires lognormales of 29 November 1954 was marked Note statistisque No 2. In this paper, Matheron explored lognormal variables and set the stage for statistics by symbols. Primary data would have allowed him to assess whether or not lead and silver grades departed from the lognormal distribution, or displayed spatial dependence along core samples in his borehole.

Matheron coined the eponym krigeage (Kriging) for the first time in his 1960 Krigeage d’un Panneau Rectangulaire par sa Périphérie. In this Note géostatistique No 28, Matheron derived k*, his estimateur and a precursor to the kriged estimate or kriged estimator. In mathematical statistics, Matheron’s k* is the length-weighted average grade of a single panneau in his set. What Matheron failed to derive in this paper was var(k*), the variance of his estimateur. Matheron presented his Stationary Random Function at the first colloquium on geostatistics in the USA. He called on Brownian motion to conjecture the continuity of his Riemann integral but did not explain what Brownian motion and ore deposits have in common. Matheron, unlike John von Neumann in 1941 and Anders Hald in 1952, never worked with Riemann sums. It was not Professor Dr Georges Matheron but Dr Frederik P Agterberg who derived the distance-weighted average of a set of measured values determined in samples selected at positions with different coordinates in a sample space. What Agterberg did not do was derive the variance of this function.

Matheron did indeed derive length-weighted average grades of core samples and ore blocks but did not derive the variance of these functions. In time, the length-weighted average grade for Matheron's three-dimensional block grade was replaced with the distance-weighted average grade for Agterberg's zero-dimensional point. Both central values turned into honorific kriged estimates or kriged estimators. An infinite set of Agterberg's zero dimensional points fits within any ore block, along any borehole, or inside any sampling unit or sample space. Matheron's block grades and Agterberg's point grades are unique because both are functions without variances.

== Mathematical morphology ==
In 1964, Matheron was supervising the PhD thesis of Jean Serra, dedicated to quantifying the ore properties of the iron deposit of Lorraine. Serra came up with the idea of using structuring elements for the analysis, which led to the concept of hit-or-miss transform. The theoretical analysis of this transform led Matheron to derive and investigate the concepts of erosion, dilation, opening and closing, which became known later as the basic morphological operators. He also developed a tool for granulometry, i.e., the computation of a "size distribution", where he mathematically characterizes the concept of size. In December 1964, Matheron and Serra, together with Philippe Formery, named this approach mathematical morphology. It has since evolved into a theory and method that is applied in a variety of image processing problems and tasks, and is researched worldwide (main article: Mathematical morphology). Matheron continued to contribute to mathematical morphology during the years, his best-known contribution being the morphological filtering theory, which he developed with Serra in the 1980s.

The Georges Matheron Lectureship was established by the International Association for Mathematical Geosciences (IAMG). This award was named after Georges Matheron. Matheron Lecturers will be selected by a small committee chaired by the IAMG Vice President. The Georges Matheron Lectures will be held annually during IAMG Conferences and during International Geological Congresses. Each year IAMG selects a Georges Matheron Lecturer who is a scientist with proven research ability in the field of spatial statistics or mathematical morphology. Beginning at IAMG’2006 in Liège, Jean Serra was the first recipient of this award in 2006, delivered the first Georges Matheron Lecture.

== The Centre de Géostatistique et de Morphologie Mathématique ==
In 1968, the Paris School of Mines created the Centre de Morphologie Mathématique, located in Fontainebleau, France, and named Matheron its first director. In 1979, the center was renamed Centre de Géostatistique et de Morphologie Mathématique, and, in 1986, the latter was split into two separate centers: Centre de Géostatistique, directed by Matheron, and Centre de Morphologie Mathématique, directed by Serra.

== Books by Matheron ==
- Traité de géostatistique appliquée, Editions Technip, France, 1962–63, where Matheron lays the fundamental tools of linear geostatistics: variography, variances of estimation and dispersion, and kriging.
- His doctoral thesis: Les variables régionalisées et leur estimation: une application de la théorie des fonctions aléatoires aux sciences de la nature, published in 1965 by Masson, Paris.
- Elements pour une théorie des milieux poreux, Masson, Paris, 1967, which includes Matheron's work on hydrodynamics.
- Matheron's Theory of Regionalised Variables. Oxford University Press. 2019. ISBN 9780198835660.
- Random sets and integral geometry, John Wiley & Sons, 1975, ISBN 978-0-471-57621-1, conveying his contribution to the theory of random sets.
- Estimating and Choosing: An Essay on Probability in Practice, Springer, 1989, ISBN 978-0-387-50087-4, a newer reference book on geostatistics.
