= Discrete skeleton evolution =

Discrete Skeleton Evolution (DSE) describes an iterative approach to reducing a morphological or topological skeleton. It is a form of pruning in that it removes noisy or redundant branches (spurs) generated by the skeletonization process, while preserving information-rich "trunk" segments. The value assigned to individual branches varies from algorithm to algorithm, with the general goal being to convey the features of interest of the original contour with a few carefully chosen lines. Usually, clarity for human vision (a.k.a. the ability to "read" some features of the original shape from the skeleton) is valued as well. DSE algorithms are distinguished by complex, recursive decision-making processes with high computational requirements. Pruning methods such as by structuring element (SE) convolution and the Hough transform are general purpose algorithms which quickly pass through an image and eliminate all branches shorter than a given threshold. DSE methods are most applicable when detail retention and contour reconstruction are valued.

== Methodology ==
=== Pre-processing ===
Input images will typical contain more data than is necessary to generate an initial skeleton, and thus must be reduced in some way. Reducing the resolution, converting to grayscale, and then binary by masking or thresholding are common first steps. Noise removal may occur before and/or after converting an image to binary. Morphological operations such as closing, opening, and smoothing of the binary image may also be part of pre-processing. Ideally, the binarized contour should be as noise-free as possible before the skeleton is generated.

=== Skeletonization ===
DSE techniques may be applied to an existing skeleton or incorporated as part of the skeleton growing algorithm. Suitable skeletons may be obtained using a variety of methods:

- Thinning algorithms, such as the Grassfire transform
- Voronoi diagram
- Medial Axis Transform or Symmetry Axis Transform
- Distance Mapping

=== Significance Measures ===
DSE and related methods remove entire spurious branches while leaving the main trunk intact. The intended result is typically optimized for visual clarity and retention of information, such that the original contour can be reconstructed from the fully pruned skeleton. The value of various properties must be weighted by the application, and improving the efficiency is an ongoing topic of research in computer vision and image processing. Some significance measures include:

- Discrete Bisector Function
- Contour length
- Bending Potential Ratio
- Discrete Curve Evolution

=== Iteration ===
Each branch is evaluated during a pass through the skeletonized image according to the specific algorithm being used. Low value branches are removed and the process is repeated until a desired threshold of simplicity is reached.

=== Reconstruction ===
If all points on the output skeleton are the center points of maximal disks of the image and the radius information is retained, a contour image can be reconstructed

== Applications ==
=== Handwriting and text parsing ===
Variability in hand-written text is an ongoing challenge, simplification makes it somewhat easier for computer vision algorithms to make judgements about intended characters.

=== Soft body classification (animals) ===
The maximal disks centered on the skeleton imply roughly spherical masses, the features of the extracted skeleton are relatively unchanged even as the soft body deforms or self-occludes. Skeleton information is one facet of determining whether two animals are the "same" some way, though it must usually be paired with another technique to effectively identify a target.

=== Medical uses ===
Investigation of organs, tissue damage and deformation caused by disease.
