= Top hat (disambiguation) =

A top hat is a tall hat worn primarily in the 19th and early 20th century.

Top hat, Top Hat, Tophat or Top-hat may also refer to:

- Top Hat, a 1935 film starring Fred Astaire and Ginger Rogers
- Top Hat (musical), a 2011 stage musical adapted from the 1935 film
- Top hat (lighting), a theatrical lighting device
- Top hat (roller coaster element)
- TopHat (telescope), a balloon-borne experiment to measure the cosmic microwave background
- Top Hat (TUGS), a recurring character in the children's television series TUGS
- Top Hat 25 (and later model Top Hat 27), an Australian-made sailing yacht
- Top-hat filter, a signal filtering technique
- Top-hat transform, an operator from mathematical morphology and digital image processing
- TopHat (bioinformatics), a bioinformatic sequence analysis package tool
- TOPHAT, cryptonym of Dmitri Polyakov (1921–1988), a Soviet general and a spy for the CIA
- Tophat beam, a kind of laser beam
- Operation Top Hat, a "local field exercise" conducted by the United States Army Chemical Corps in 1953
- Top Hat (The Penguin), an episode of the American television miniseries The Penguin
- Top hat, another name for a steel batten
- Top Hat, in automotive design, differing upper bodies sharing a common platform
- Top hat, a network of wires at the top of a mast radiator
- "The Top Hat", an episode of the TV series Pocoyo

== Distinguish from ==
- Tophet
