= DSE =

DSE may refer to:

== Economy ==
- Dominant strategy equilibrium, an economic term in game theory

=== Stock exchanges ===
- Dar es Salaam Stock Exchange
- Dhaka Stock Exchange, the main Stock Exchange of Dhaka, Bangladesh
- Damascus Securities Exchange, the main Stock Exchange of Damascus, Syria

== Government and administration ==
- Discover Science & Engineering, an Irish Government initiative
- Department of Sustainability and Environment in Victoria, Australia
- Data Services Environment, a service of the Defense Information Systems Agency, United States

== Education ==
- Delhi School of Economics
- Disability Studies in Education
- Hong Kong Diploma of Secondary Education, an examination after completing secondary education in Hong Kong

== Sports ==
- Dream Stage Entertainment, a Japanese company that promotes MMA and wrestling matches
- Dolphin South End Running Club, a San Francisco running club

== Science and medicine ==
- DSE (gene), human gene which codes for dermatan-sulfate epimerase
- Dobutamine Stress Echo, a cardiac stress test
- Dark septate endophytes, a group of fungi that are symbiotic within vascular plant roots
- Design space exploration, systematic analysis and pruning of unwanted design points based on parameters of interest
- Discrete skeleton evolution, an iterative approach to reducing a morphological or topological skeleton

== Computing and electronics ==
- Dead Space: Extraction, a 2009 videogame available for the Nintendo Wii and the PlayStation 3
- Dick Smith Electronics, an electronics company

== Other uses ==
- Dimokratikos Stratos Elladas, the Greek Civil War Communist army ('Democratic Army of Greece')
- Dry Sheep Equivalent, a standard unit frequently used in Australia
- Combolcha Airport in Ethiopia
- Dr. Seuss Enterprises, a subsidiary of Penguin Random House for the works of author Dr. Seuss
