= Gato Roboto =

2019 Metroidvania video game

- Developer: Doinksoft
- Publisher: Devolver Digital
- Engine: GameMaker Studio
- Platforms: Nintendo Switch; Windows; Xbox One
- Release: Nintendo Switch, Windows; May 30, 2019; Xbox One; April 21, 2020
- Genres: Action-adventure, metroidvania
- Mode: Single-player

Gato Roboto is a 2D Metroidvania video game developed by American studio Doinksoft and published by Devolver Digital on May 30, 2019. The game follows a cat named Kiki attempting to save her owner after they crash land on an alien planet, forcing Kiki to don a mech suit and explore the planet's depths.

== Gameplay ==
In Gato Roboto players control a cat named Kiki. By default, Kiki can climb and jump off of walls, swim in water, and fit through small gaps. She is unable to damage enemies or use any other abilities, and dies in one hit. However, while inside of a mech suit (which can be obtained at most save points) she gains multiple hit points, a gun attack, as well as several other upgrades found throughout the game, such as a double jump and a dash ability. Other mechs, including a submarine and a turret, can be found throughout the game.

The player's main goal is to enter the lab of the alien planet Kiki is stranded on in order to find a way to free Kiki's owner, Gary. Access to the lab is blocked off until the player clears the planet's aqueducts, heating system, and ventilation system, after doing which they advance to the lab, the final area of the game. Throughout the game's world there are many upgrades, including movement abilities, health upgrades, and cassette tapes which unlock optional color palette swaps for the game's 1-bit graphics.

== Plot ==
In the distant future, Gary and his cat Kiki are piloting a spaceship to a distress call in an alien planet. While flying towards the planet, Kiki steps on the ship's keyboard causing the ship to crash land. Both survive, but Gary is trapped with the wrecked ship, while Kiki is outside of it. Gary then sends Kiki out to find a mech suit, explore the planet, and find a way to get off of it. Throughout the world Kiki can discover voice logs which speak of a mad scientist obsessed with keeping his sickly dog Barkley alive. Additionally, as Kiki clears out the planet's systems to gain access to the lab, they repeatedly encounter a talking rat, who is eventually revealed to be the mad scientist, transferred into a different body. He confesses to using a false security alert to lure Gary's ship to his planet, in order to steal Gary's body. He transfers his consciousness into Gary's body, and plans to save Barkley by transferring his consciousness into Kiki's body. The scientist successfully destroys Kiki's mech suit, but she uses the passcode (MEOW) to free Barkley from his hydroglobular tube. The scientist appeals to Barkley, but he attacks the scientist and incapacitates him before leading Kiki to a spaceship. They escape the planet, leaving the scientist behind. It's implied in the post-game that Gary escaped with them in the scientist's former rat body.

== Reception ==
Reception

Aggregate score
Aggregator	Score
Metacritic	79/100 (PC); 72/100 (Switch)

Review scores
Publication	Score
Destructoid	6.5/10
Eurogamer	Recommended
Game Informer	7.75/10
Hardcore Gamer	8/10
Nintendo Life	8/10
Nintendo World Report	8/10
Shacknews	8/10
VideoGamer.com	6/10
IGN Japan	7.8/10
IGN Spain	7.5/10

According to review aggregator Metacritic, the PC version received generally favorable reviews from critics while the Switch version received mixed or average reviews. Kyle LeClair of Hardcore Gamer called it a "fun, insane concept" and "simple yet highly fun". In regards to difficulty, IGN Japan said it was "more difficult than you would expect from a game that stars a cute cat in mech armor, but it's well worth it if you're up for the challenge."
