= John Cedric Griffiths Teaching Award =

The John Cedric Griffiths Teaching Award is presented alternate years to honor outstanding teaching with preference for teaching that involves application of mathematics or informatics to the Earth's nonrenewable natural resources or to sedimentary geology every year by the International Association for Mathematical Geosciences (IAMG). The John Cedric Griffiths Teaching Award, named after John Cedric Griffiths, was established in 1996.

== Recipients ==
The following people are recipients of this award:

- 1996 John H. Doveton
- 1998 Margaret Armstrong
- 2000 Lawrence Drew
- 2002 Ian Lerche
- 2004 Jack Schuenemeyer
- 2006 Paul Switzer
- 2008 Vera Pawlowsky-Glahn
- 2010 Ana Fernández Militino
- 2012 Helmut Schaeben
- 2014 Clayton V. Deutsch
- 2016 Juan José Egozcue
- 2018 Ute Mueller
- 2020 Gang Liu
- 2022 Philippe Renard
- 2024 Joao Felipe Costa

== See also ==
- List of geology awards
- List of geophysics awards
- List of mathematics awards
