= Ana Fernández Militino =

Spanish spatial statistician

Ana María Fernández Militino is a Spanish spatial statistician. She is a professor of statistics and operations research at the Public University of Navarre. Despite the usual conventions for Spanish surnames, her English-language publications list her name as "Ana F. Militino".

== Education and career ==
Militino studied mathematics at the University of Zaragoza from 1976 to 1981, and completed a doctorate in statistics in 1984 at the University of Extremadura. After several years of work as a public administrator, she became a professor at the Public University of Navarre in 1990.

== Books ==
Militino is the coauthor, with Alan T. Arnholt and María Dolores Ugarte, of the book Probability and Statistics with R (Chapman & Hall / CRC, 2008), and is the author of several other statistics textbooks.

== Recognition ==
In 2010 the International Association for Mathematical Geosciences gave Militino their John Cedric Griffiths Teaching Award.
