= María Dolores Ugarte =

Spanish statistician

- Other name: Lola Ugarte
- Education: University of Zaragoza; Public University of Navarre; Simon Fraser University
- Occupation: Statistician

María Dolores (Lola) Ugarte Martínez is a Spanish statistician specializing in spatial analysis, spatio-temporal analysis, epidemiology, and small area estimation. She is a professor in the Statistics, Computer Science, and Mathematics Department at the Public University of Navarre.

== Education and career ==
Ugarte earned a degree in mathematics from the University of Zaragoza in 1989, and completed her Ph.D. in 1996 at the Public University of Navarre. After post-doctoral research at Simon Fraser University in Canada, she became an associate professor at the Public University of Navarre in 1997, and full professor in 2009. She chaired the statistics department there from 2007 to 2012.

Her research focuses on the general field of statistical modeling and spatial and spatio-temporal statistics, a subject that has applications in many fields. As a professor, she has taught statistics as well as other similar undergraduate, master's and doctoral degree programs.

Ugarte served as vice president of the Spanish Statistical Society from 2010 to 2013, and as co-editor-in-chief of the journal TEST of the Spanish Society of Statistics and Operations Research from 2017 to 2020. She is treasurer of the Federation of European National Statistical Societies.

== Books ==
Ugarte is the coauthor, with Ana Fernández Militino and Alan T. Arnholt, of the textbook Probability and Statistics with R (CRC Press, 2008; 2nd ed., 2016). She is co-editor, with Andrew B. Lawson, Sudipto Banerjee, and Robert Haining, of the Handbook of Spatial Epidemiology (CRC Press, 2016).
