= Christian Lantuéjoul =

French mathematician (born 1950)

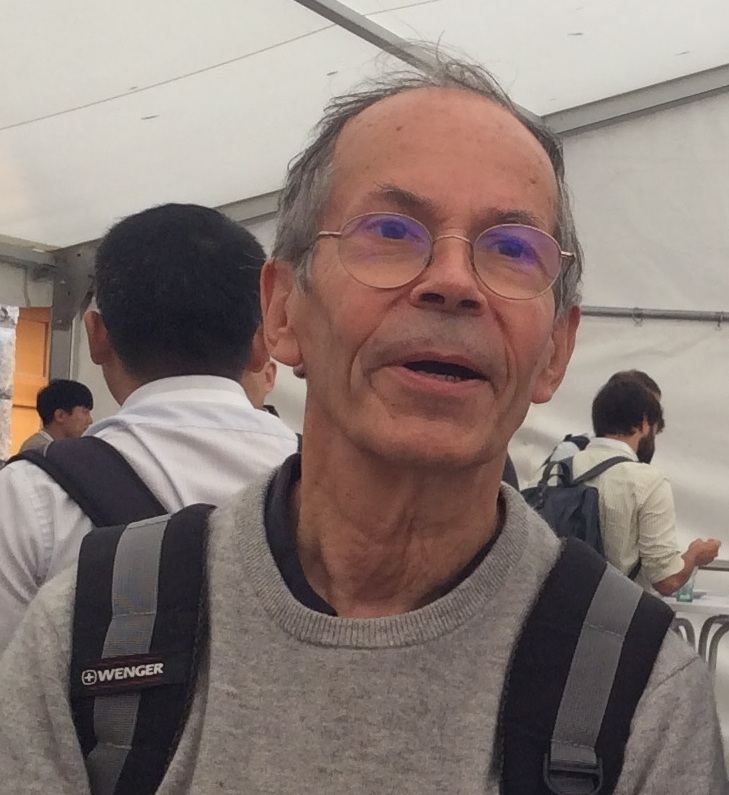
- Lantuéjoul at Olomouc in 2018
- Born: 1950 (age 75–76); France
- Known for: Geostatistics, geodesic morphology
- Awards: Georges Matheron Lectureship
- Scientific career
- Fields: Geostatistics; Mathematical morphology
- Workplaces: School of Mines ParisTech

Christian Lantuéjoul (born 1950) is a French mathematician. Lantuéjoul was selected to receive Georges Matheron Lectureship Award – 2018 from the International Association for Mathematical Geosciences. Lantuéjoul serves as director of research at School of Mines ParisTech.

== Education ==
- PhD School of Mines, Nancy

== Selected book ==
- Christian Lantuéjoul, Geostatistical Simulation. Models and Algorithms (2002), Springer-Verlag, 256 pages
