= Centre de Morphologie Mathématique =

Research center of the École des Mines de Paris in France

Coordinates: 48.404°N 2.694°E

Centre de Morphologie Mathématique (or Center of Mathematical Morphology, or CMM) is a research center of the École des Mines de Paris, France, devoted to the research and promotion of mathematical morphology. It was created in 1968 as a result of the works of Georges Matheron and Jean Serra, who were hired as its first director and assistant director, respectively.

In 1979, the center was renamed Centre de Géostatistique et de Morphologie Mathématique, reflecting its increased scope. In 1986, the part related to geostatistics split into an independent center (Centre de Géostatistique), still directed by Matheron. Serra was named the directory of the new CMM.

The research center developed XLim which was used at the origin of Aphelion developments in 1999.

The CMM is located at Fontainebleau, France.
