= H-maxima transform =

In mathematical morphology, the h-maxima transform is a morphological operation used to filter local maxima of an image based on local contrast information. First, all local maxima are defined as connected pixels in a given neighborhood with intensity level greater than pixels outside the neighborhood. Second, all local maxima that have height $f$ lower or equal to a given threshold are suppressed. The height f of the remaining maxima is decreased by $h$.

The h-maxima transform is defined as the reconstruction by dilation of $f$ from $f-h$:

$$\operatorname{HMAX}_h(f)=R_f^\delta(f-h)$$
