= Margaret Armstrong (geostatistician) =

Australian geostatistician

Margaret Armstrong is an Australian geostatistician, mathematical geoscientist, and textbook author. She works as an associate professor in the School of Applied Mathematics at the Fundação Getúlio Vargas in Brazil, and as a research associate in the Centre for Industrial Economics of Mines ParisTech in France.

== Education ==
Armstrong graduated from the University of Queensland in 1972, with a bachelor's degree in mathematics and a diploma of education. After working as a mathematics teacher she returned to graduate study, first with a master's degree in mathematics from Queensland in 1977, and then with Georges Matheron at the École des Mines de Paris. She completed her doctorate there in 1980.

== Books ==
Armstrong is the author of the textbook Basic Linear Geostatistics (Springer, 1998), and co-author of the book Plurigaussian Simulations in Geosciences (Springer, 2003; 2nd ed., 2011). With Matheron, she edited Geostatistical Case Studies (Springer, 1987).

== Recognition ==
In 1998, Armstrong was the winner of the John Cedric Griffiths Teaching Award of the International Association for Mathematical Geosciences. The award statement noted "her aptitude at the blackboard", the international demand for her short courses, and the "great clarity" of her book Basic Linear Geostatistics.
