= Solid sweep =

Euclidean solid geometry

The sweep S_{w} of a solid S is defined as the solid created when a motion M is applied to a given solid. The solid S should be considered to be a set of points in the Euclidean space $\mathbb{R}^3$. Then the solid S_{w} which is generated by sweeping S over M will contain all the points over which the points of S have moved during the motion M. Solid sweeping which uses this process is employed in different fields, including the modelling of fillets and rounds, interference detection and the simulation of the numerical controlled machining process.
