= International Society for Stereology & Image Analysis =

International Society for Stereology & Image Analysis (ISSIA)
- Formation: 1961
- Headquarters: Prague
- Location: Czech Republic
- Official language: English
- President: Lucie Kubínová
- Website: http://www.issia.net

The International Society for Stereology & Image Analysis (ISSIA) is an international scientific society whose purpose is to encourage the development and dissemination of knowledge in stereology and image analysis in a wide range of disciplines. It was founded in 1961. Although the Society is currently based in the Czech Republic, it is an international organization. The former name (until 2017) was International Society for Stereology.

The society both shares the Journal of Microscopy with the Royal Microscopical Society as its official journal, as well as having its own journal called Image Analysis & Stereology (formerly known as Acta Stereologica).

== Organization ==
The society is active in all fields of stereology, which is an interdisciplinary field of research concerned with the threedimensional interpretation of lower dimensional samples of materials or tissues. It utilizes random, systematic sampling to provide unbiased and quantitative data from microscopic images. The society is associated with the international journal Image Analysis & Stereology.

== Events ==
Professor Hans Elias organized the first meeting on stereology in 1961 in the Feldberg, the Black Forest of Germany. The aim was to discuss quantification of 3-D objects based on their 2-D sections. The following year the International Society for Stereology (ISS, now ISSIA) convened for its first congress in Vienna, Austria. The second congress was in Chicago in April 1967, and the third congress was in Bern in 1971. Proceedings of the fourth congress in Gaithersburg 1975 are available on-line.
