= Thinning (morphology) =

Thinning is the transformation of a digital image into a simplified, but topologically equivalent image. It is a type of topological skeleton, but computed using mathematical morphology operators.

== Example ==
Let $E=Z^2$, and consider the eight composite structuring elements, composed by:

$C_1=\{(0,0),(-1,-1),(0,-1),(1,-1)\}$ and $D_1=\{(-1,1),(0,1),(1,1)\}$,
$C_2=\{(-1,0),(0,0),(-1,-1),(0,-1)\}$ and $D_2=\{(0,1),(1,1),(1,0)\}$

and the three rotations of each by $90^o$, $180^o$, and $270^o$. The corresponding composite structuring elements are denoted $B_1,\ldots,B_8$.

For any i between 1 and 8, and any binary image X, define

$$X\otimes B_i=X\setminus (X\odot B_i)$$,

where $\setminus$ denotes the set-theoretical difference and $\odot$ denotes the hit-or-miss transform.

The thinning of an image A is obtained by cyclically iterating until convergence:

$$A\otimes B_1\otimes B_2\otimes\ldots\otimes B_8\otimes B_1\otimes B_2\otimes\ldots$$.

== Thickening ==
Thickening is the dual of thinning that is used to grow selected regions of foreground pixels. In most cases in image processing thickening is performed by thinning the background $\text{thicken}(X, B_i) = X\cup (X\odot B_i)$

where $\cup$ denotes the set-theoretical difference and $\odot$ denotes the hit-or-miss transform, and $B_i$ is the structural element and $X$ is the image being operated on.
