= Image Analysis & Stereology =

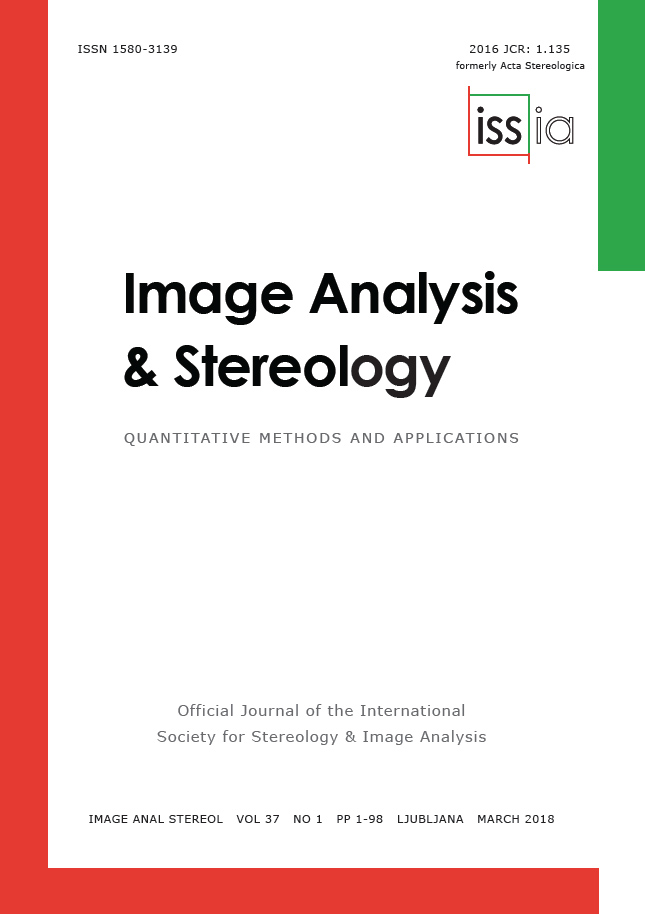
- Discipline: Image analysis, Stereology
- Language: English
- Edited by: Marko Kreft

Publication details
- History: 1982-present
- Publisher: DSKAS (Slovenia)
- Frequency: Triannually
- Open access: Open access
- Impact factor: 1.778 (2018)

Standard abbreviations
- ISO 4: Image Anal. Stereol.

Indexing
- ISSN: 1580-3139 (print); 1854-5165 (web)

Links
- Journal homepage; Online access

Image Analysis & Stereology (IAS) formerly Acta Stereologica, is a triannual peer-reviewed scientific journal published by an independent not-for-profit publisher DSKAS. It is the official journal of the International Society for Stereology & Image Analysis. The journal publishes articles of all fields of image analysis and processing.

== History ==
The journal Acta Stereologica was conceived at the European Symposium for Stereology in 1981. Miroslav Kališnik, the editor of Yugoslav stereology journal Stereologia Iugoslavica and Gerhard Ondracek, the editor of the Newsletter in Stereology decided that both journals, that they edited will join forces to establish a new international journal. The new journal was edited by Kališnik for 17 years. The president of the International Society for Stereology (now ISSIA) Hans Eckart Exner adopted the new journal to be the official journal of ISSIA. The ownership (the publisher) of the new journal was the Stereological section of the Yugoslav Association of Anatomists, now DSKAS Society. Acta Stereologica (ISSN 0351-580X) has been renamed in 1999 to Image Analysis and Stereology.

=== Editors ===
The following persons have been editor-in-chief of the journal:

- 1982–1999: Miroslav Kališnik
- 1999–2016: Ida Eržen
- 2016–present: Marko Kreft

== Abstracting and indexing ==
The journal is indexed and abstracted in the following databases:

- Cambridge Scientific Abstracts
- Chemical Abstracts
- Current Contents/Engineering Computing and Technology
- Current Index to Statistics
- DOAJ
- EBSCO
- INSPEC
- Journal Citation Reports/Science Edition
- Mathematical Reviews
- MathSciNet
- METADEX
- Referativnyj Zhurnal
- Science Citation Index Expanded
- SCOPUS
- Web of Knowledge
- Zentralblatt MATH
