= Closing (morphology) =

Basic operation in mathematical morphology

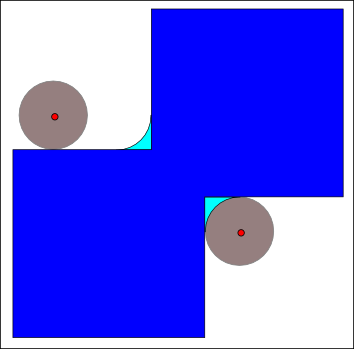
The closing of the dark-blue shape (union of two squares) by a disk, resulting in the union of the dark-blue shape and the light-blue areas.

In mathematical morphology, the closing of a set (binary image) A by a structuring element B is the erosion of the dilation of that set,

$$A\bullet B = (A\oplus B)\ominus B, \,$$

where $\oplus$ and $\ominus$ denote the dilation and erosion, respectively.

In image processing, closing is, together with opening, the basic workhorse of morphological noise removal. Opening removes small objects, while closing removes small holes.

== Example ==
Perform Dilation ( $A\oplus B$ ):

Suppose A is the following 11 x 11 matrix and B is the following 3 x 3 matrix:

    0 0 0 0 0 0 0 0 0 0 0
    0 1 1 1 1 0 0 1 1 1 0   
    0 1 1 1 1 0 0 1 1 1 0  
    0 1 1 1 1 1 1 1 1 1 0
    0 1 1 1 1 0 0 0 1 1 0              1 1 1
    0 1 1 1 1 0 0 0 1 1 0              1 1 1
    0 1 0 0 1 0 0 0 1 1 0              1 1 1
    0 1 0 0 1 1 1 1 1 1 0       
    0 1 1 1 1 1 1 1 0 0 0   
    0 1 1 1 1 1 1 1 0 0 0   
    0 0 0 0 0 0 0 0 0 0 0

For each pixel in A that has a value of 1, superimpose B, with the center of B aligned with the corresponding pixel in A.

Each pixel of every superimposed B is included in the dilation of A by B.

The dilation of A by B is given by this 11 x 11 matrix.

$A \oplus B$ is given by :

    1 1 1 1 1 1 1 1 1 1 1
    1 1 1 1 1 1 1 1 1 1 1
    1 1 1 1 1 1 1 1 1 1 1   
    1 1 1 1 1 1 1 1 1 1 1  
    1 1 1 1 1 1 1 1 1 1 1
    1 1 1 1 1 1 0 1 1 1 1
    1 1 1 1 1 1 1 1 1 1 1
    1 1 1 1 1 1 1 1 1 1 1
    1 1 1 1 1 1 1 1 1 1 1       
    1 1 1 1 1 1 1 1 1 0 0   
    1 1 1 1 1 1 1 1 1 0 0   

Now, Perform Erosion on the result: ($A\oplus B$) $\ominus B$

$A\oplus B$ is the following 11 x 11 matrix and B is the following 3 x 3 matrix:

    1 1 1 1 1 1 1 1 1 1 1
    1 1 1 1 1 1 1 1 1 1 1   
    1 1 1 1 1 1 1 1 1 1 1  
    1 1 1 1 1 1 1 1 1 1 1
    1 1 1 1 1 1 1 1 1 1 1              1 1 1
    1 1 1 1 1 1 0 1 1 1 1              1 1 1
    1 1 1 1 1 1 1 1 1 1 1              1 1 1
    1 1 1 1 1 1 1 1 1 1 1       
    1 1 1 1 1 1 1 1 1 1 1   
    1 1 1 1 1 1 1 1 1 0 0   
    1 1 1 1 1 1 1 1 1 0 0

Assuming that the origin B is at its center, for each pixel in $A\oplus B$ superimpose the origin of B, if B is completely contained by A the pixel is retained, else deleted.

Therefore the Erosion of $A\oplus B$ by B is given by this 11 x 11 matrix.

($A\oplus B$) $\ominus B$ is given by:

    0 0 0 0 0 0 0 0 0 0 0
    0 1 1 1 1 1 1 1 1 1 0
    0 1 1 1 1 1 1 1 1 1 0
    0 1 1 1 1 1 1 1 1 1 0
    0 1 1 1 1 0 0 0 1 1 0
    0 1 1 1 1 0 0 0 1 1 0 
    0 1 1 1 1 0 0 0 1 1 0
    0 1 1 1 1 1 1 1 1 1 0 
    0 1 1 1 1 1 1 1 0 0 0 
    0 1 1 1 1 1 1 1 0 0 0
    0 0 0 0 0 0 0 0 0 0 0

Therefore Closing Operation fills small holes and smooths the object by filling narrow gaps.

== Properties ==
- It is idempotent, that is, $(A\bullet B)\bullet B=A\bullet B$.
- It is increasing, that is, if $A\subseteq C$, then $A\bullet B \subseteq C\bullet B$.
- It is extensive, i.e., $A\subseteq A\bullet B$.
- It is translation invariant.

== See also ==
- Mathematical morphology
- Dilation
- Erosion
- Opening
- Top-hat transformation

== Bibliography ==
- Image Analysis and Mathematical Morphology by Jean Serra, ISBN 0-12-637240-3 (1982)
- Image Analysis and Mathematical Morphology, Volume 2: Theoretical Advances by Jean Serra, ISBN 0-12-637241-1 (1988)
- An Introduction to Morphological Image Processing by Edward R. Dougherty, ISBN 0-8194-0845-X (1992)
