= Binary image =

Image comprising exactly two colors, typically black and white

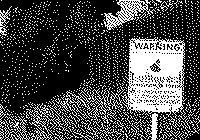
A photograph of a neighborhood watch sign is the foreground color while the rest of the image is the background color. In the document-scanning industry, this is often referred to as "bi-tonal".

A binary image is a digital image that consists of pixels that can have one of exactly two colors, usually black and white. Each pixel is stored as a single bit — i.e. either a 0 or 1.

A binary image can be stored in memory as a bitmap: a packed array of bits. A binary image of 640 × 480 pixels has a file size of only 37.5 KiB, and most also compress well with simple run-length compression. A binary image format is often used in contexts where it is important to have a small file size for transmission or storage, or due to color limitations on displays or printers.

It also has technical and artistic applications, for example in digital image processing and pixel art. Binary images can be interpreted as subsets of the two-dimensional integer lattice $\mathbb{Z}^2$; the field of morphological image processing was largely inspired by this view.

== Terminology ==
Binary images are also called bi-level or two-level. Pixel art made up of two colours is often referred to as 1-bit in reference to the single bit required to store each pixel. The names black-and-white, B&W, monochrome or monochromatic are often used, but can also designate other image types with only one sample per pixel, such as grayscale images. In Photoshop parlance, a binary image is the same as an image in "Bitmap" color mode.

== Operations on binary images ==
An entire class of operations on binary images operates on a 3 × 3 window of the image. This contains nine pixels, so 2^{9} or 512 possible values. Considering only the central pixel, it is possible to define whether it remains set or unset, based on the surrounding pixels. Examples of such operations are thinning, dilating, finding branch points and endpoints, removing isolated pixels, shifting the image a pixel in any direction, and breaking H-connections. Conway's Game of Life is also an example of a 3 × 3 window operation.

Another class of operations is based on the notion of filtering with a structuring element. The structuring element is binary image, usually small, which is passed over the target image, in a similar manner to a filter in gray scale image processing. Since the pixels can only have two values, the morphological operations are erosion (any unset pixels within the structuring element cause the pixel to be unset) and dilation (any set pixels within the structuring element cause the pixel to be set). Important operations are morphological opening and morphological closing which consist of erosion followed by dilation and dilation followed by erosion, respectively, using the same structuring element. Opening tends to enlarge small holes, remove small objects, and separate objects. Closing retains small objects, removes holes, and joins objects.

A very important characteristic of a binary image is the distance transform. This gives the distance of every set pixel from the nearest unset pixel. The distance transform can be efficiently calculated. It allows efficient computation of Voronoi diagrams, where each pixel in an image is assigned to the nearest of a set of points. It also allows skeletonization, which differs from thinning in that skeletons allow recovery of the original image. The distance transform is also useful for determining the center of the object, and for matching in image recognition.

Another class of operations is gathering orientation-free metrics. This is often important in image recognition where the orientation of the camera needs to be removed. Orientation-free metrics of a group of connected or surrounded pixels include the Euler number, the perimeter, the area, the compactness, the area of holes, the minimum radius, the maximum radius.

=== Image segmentation ===
Binary images are produced from color images by segmentation. Segmentation is the process of assigning each pixel in the source image to two or more classes. If there are more than two classes then the usual result is several binary images. The simplest form of segmentation is probably Otsu's method which assigns pixels to foreground or background based on grayscale intensity. Another method is the watershed algorithm. Edge detection also often creates a binary image with some pixels assigned to edge pixels, and is also a first step in further segmentation.

=== Skeletons ===
Thinning or skeletonization produces binary images which consist of pixel-wide lines. The branchpoints and endpoints can then be extracted, and the image converted to a graph. This is important in image recognition, for example in optical character recognition.

=== Interpretation ===
The interpretation of the pixel's binary value is also device-dependent. Some systems interprets the bit value of 0 as black and 1 as white, while others reversed the meaning of the values. In the TWAIN standard PC interface for scanners and digital cameras, the first flavor is called vanilla and the reversed one chocolate.

Dithering is often used for displaying halftone images.

== Usages ==
=== 1-bit pixel art ===
1-bit pixel art combining imagery with text

Binary pixelart, better known as 1-Bit or 1bit art, has been a method of displaying graphics since early computers. While early computers such as the ZX81 used the restriction as a necessity of the hardware, hand-held LCD games such as Game & Watch and Tamagotchi, alongside early computers with a focus on graphic user interfaces like the Macintosh made large steps in promoting the culture, technique and aesthetic of the restrictions of 1-bit art.

Modern examples of 1bit art are visible in indie videogames and other digital art. Best-seller games like Gato Roboto, Return of the Obra Dinn, Minit and World of Horror use 1bit as a style to give their games a retro feel or to simply save the graphic designers time in development. There are also game consoles focused on 1-Bit graphics, such as the handheld Playdate console, which is also used in education in favor of more involved engines.

For pixel artists, 1-Bit has become a common challenge for creating art. The pixelart contest Pixtogether required its participants to use only two colours for its 10th monthly contest. Not a lot of artists mainly do 1bit art, but many of them stay in contact with each other to exchange knowledge about working with the restriction, and hosting own collaborations.

Brandon James Greer, who makes popular YouTube tutorials on 1bit and other pixel artwork, says that "the restriction leads to some unique approaches" and that working in 1-Bit is "a very fun and unique challenge".

While 1bit can be called an art style itself, each piece falls under a second style too. Obvious differences in 1bit art styles are for example whether, how much and what kind of dithering is being used, the image resolution, the use of outlines and how detailed the artwork is.

=== Computer peripherals ===
Some input/output devices, such as laser printers, fax machines, and bi-level computer displays, can only handle binary images.

=== Early mobile computing and internet ===
In 1999, the Wireless Application Protocol Forum introduced the standard for the .wbmp (wireless bitmap) file format as part of the standards for displaying WAP pages.

=== Visual cryptography ===
A demonstration of visual cryptography: when two same-sized images of apparently random black-and-white pixels are superimposed, the Wikipedia logo appears

In 1994, Moni Naor and Adi Shamir demonstrated a visual secret sharing scheme, where a binary image was broken up into n shares so that only someone with all n shares could decrypt the image, while any n − 1 shares revealed no information about the original image. Each share was printed on a separate transparency, and decryption was performed by overlaying the shares. When all n shares were overlaid, the original image would appear. There are several generalizations of the basic scheme including k-out-of-n visual cryptography, and using opaque sheets but illuminating them by multiple sets of identical illumination patterns under the recording of only one single-pixel detector.

=== Digital image editing ===
Binary images often arise in digital image processing of more complex images, in the form of masks, as a result of thresholding, and for use in dithering.

=== Oversampled binary image sensors ===
An oversampled binary image sensor is a digital image sensor reminiscent of traditional photographic film. Each pixel in the sensor has a binary response, giving only a one-bit quantized measurement of the local light intensity.

== See also ==
- Black-and-white
- Dithering
- Connected-component labeling
- Discrete tomography
- Netpbm format
- JBIG/JBIG2
- X BitMap
- X PixMap
- Oversampled binary image sensor
