= Nickel =

Nickel, _{28}Ni
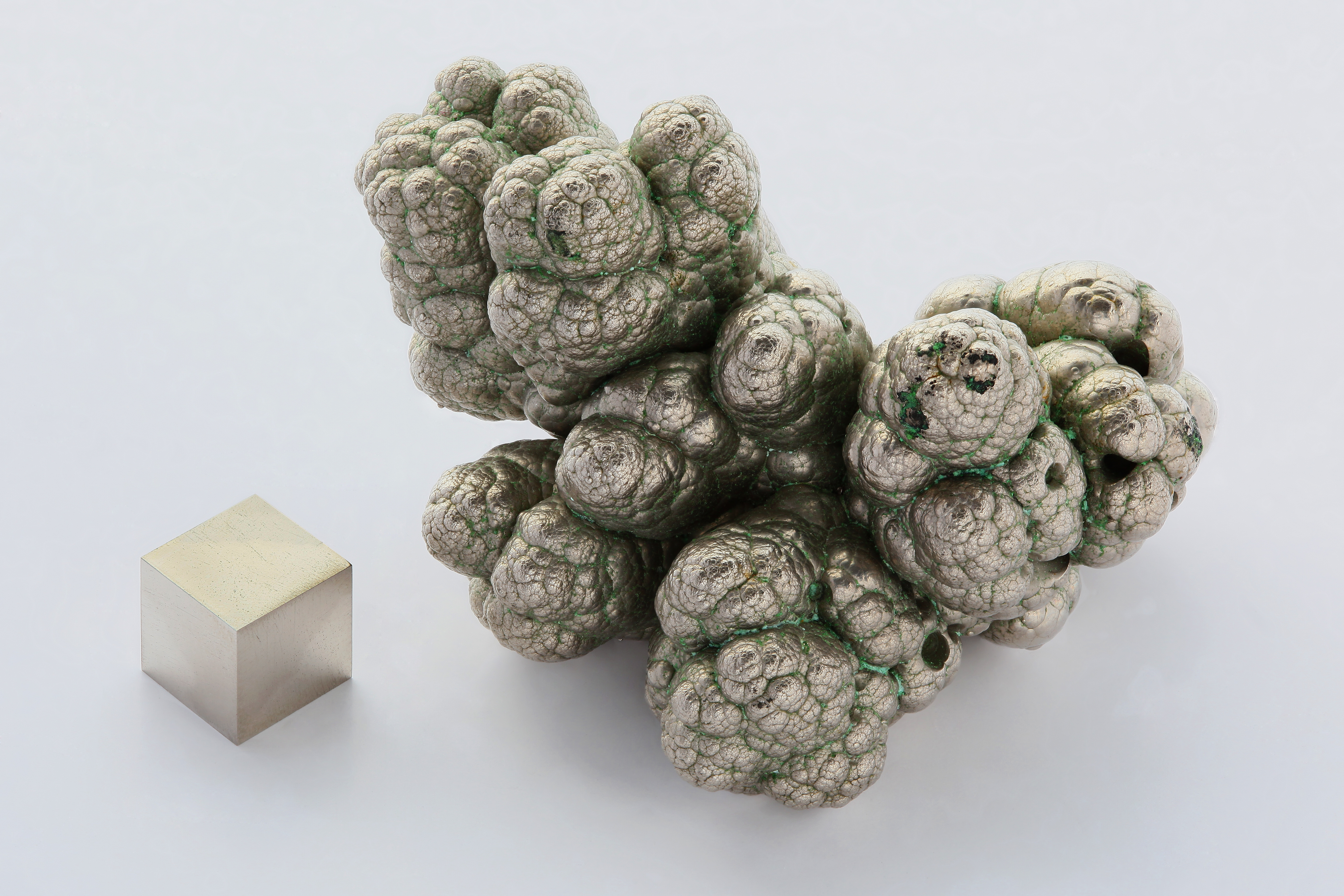

Nickel
- Appearance: Lustrous, metallic, and silver with a gold tinge

Standard atomic weight A_{r}°(Ni)
- 58.6934±0.0004; 58.693±0.001 (abridged)

Nickel in the periodic table
Hydrogen																															Helium
Lithium	Beryllium																									Boron	Carbon	Nitrogen	Oxygen	Fluorine	Neon
Sodium	Magnesium																									Aluminium	Silicon	Phosphorus	Sulfur	Chlorine	Argon
Potassium	Calcium															Scandium	Titanium	Vanadium	Chromium	Manganese	Iron	Cobalt	Nickel	Copper	Zinc	Gallium	Germanium	Arsenic	Selenium	Bromine	Krypton
Rubidium	Strontium															Yttrium	Zirconium	Niobium	Molybdenum	Technetium	Ruthenium	Rhodium	Palladium	Silver	Cadmium	Indium	Tin	Antimony	Tellurium	Iodine	Xenon
Caesium	Barium	Lanthanum	Cerium	Praseodymium	Neodymium	Promethium	Samarium	Europium	Gadolinium	Terbium	Dysprosium	Holmium	Erbium	Thulium	Ytterbium	Lutetium	Hafnium	Tantalum	Tungsten	Rhenium	Osmium	Iridium	Platinum	Gold	Mercury (element)	Thallium	Lead	Bismuth	Polonium	Astatine	Radon
Francium	Radium	Actinium	Thorium	Protactinium	Uranium	Neptunium	Plutonium	Americium	Curium	Berkelium	Californium	Einsteinium	Fermium	Mendelevium	Nobelium	Lawrencium	Rutherfordium	Dubnium	Seaborgium	Bohrium	Hassium	Meitnerium	Darmstadtium	Roentgenium	Copernicium	Nihonium	Flerovium	Moscovium	Livermorium	Tennessine	Oganesson
–
↑
Ni
↓
Pd
cobalt ← nickel → copper
- Atomic number (Z): 28
- Group: group 10
- Period: period 4
- Block: d-block
- Electron configuration: [Ar] 3d^{8} 4s^{2} or [Ar] 3d^{9} 4s^{1}
- Electrons per shell: 2, 8, 16, 2 or 2, 8, 17, 1

Physical properties
- Phase at STP: solid
- Melting point: 1728 K (1455 °C, 2651 °F)
- Boiling point: 3003 K (2730 °C, 4946 °F)
- Density (at 20° C): 8.907 g/cm^{3}
- when liquid (at m.p.): 7.81 g/cm^{3}
- Heat of fusion: 17.48 kJ/mol
- Heat of vaporization: 379 kJ/mol
- Molar heat capacity: 26.07 J/(mol·K)
- Specific heat capacity: 444.176 J/(kg·K)
Vapor pressure
P (Pa)	1	10	100	1 k	10 k	100 k
at T (K)	1783	1950	2154	2410	2741	3184

Atomic properties
- Oxidation states: common: +2 −2, −1, 0, +1, +3, +4
- Electronegativity: Pauling scale: 1.91
- Ionization energies: 1st: 737.1 kJ/mol; 2nd: 1753.0 kJ/mol; 3rd: 3395 kJ/mol; (more)
- Atomic radius: empirical: 124 pm
- Covalent radius: 124±4 pm
- Van der Waals radius: 163 pm
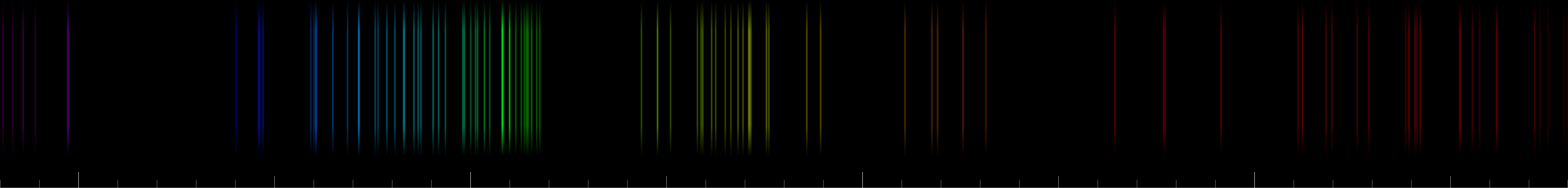
- Spectral lines of nickel

Other properties
- Natural occurrence: primordial
- Crystal structure: face-centered cubic (fcc) (cF4)
- Lattice constant: a = 352.41 pm (at 20 °C)
- Thermal expansion: 12.83×10^{−6}/K (at 20 °C)
- Thermal conductivity: 90.9 W/(m⋅K)
- Electrical resistivity: 69.3 nΩ⋅m (at 20 °C)
- Magnetic ordering: ferromagnetic
- Young's modulus: 200 GPa
- Shear modulus: 76 GPa
- Bulk modulus: 180 GPa
- Speed of sound thin rod: 4900 m/s (at r.t.)
- Poisson ratio: 0.31
- Mohs hardness: 4.0
- Vickers hardness: 638 MPa
- Brinell hardness: 667–1600 MPa
- CAS Number: 7440-02-0

History
- Naming: after Nickel, a mischievous mine spirit in German mythology
- Discovery and first isolation: Axel Fredrik Cronstedt (1751)

Isotopes of nickel
Main isotopes			Decay	
Isotope	abundance	half-life (t_{1/2})	mode	product
^{56}Ni	synth	6.075 d	β^{+}	^{56}Co
^{57}Ni	synth	35.60 h	β^{+}	^{57}Co
^{58}Ni	68.077%	stable		
^{59}Ni	trace	8.1×10^{4} y	ε	^{59}Co
^{60}Ni	26.223%	stable		
^{61}Ni	1.140%	stable		
^{62}Ni	3.635%	stable		
^{63}Ni	synth	101 y	β^{−}	^{63}Cu
^{64}Ni	0.926%	stable		

Nickel is a chemical element; it has symbol Ni and atomic number 28. It is a silvery-white lustrous metal with a slight golden tinge. Nickel is a hard and ductile transition metal. Pure nickel is chemically reactive, but large pieces are slow to react with air under standard conditions because a passivation layer of nickel oxide that prevents further corrosion forms on the surface. Even so, pure native nickel is found in Earth's crust only in tiny amounts, usually in ultramafic rocks, and in the interiors of larger nickel–iron meteorites that were not exposed to oxygen when outside Earth's atmosphere.

Meteoric nickel is found in combination with iron, a reflection of the origin of those elements as major end products of supernova nucleosynthesis. An iron–nickel mixture is thought to compose Earth's outer and inner cores.

Use of nickel (as natural meteoric nickel–iron alloy) has been traced as far back as 3500 BCE. Nickel was first isolated and classified as an element in 1751 by Axel Fredrik Cronstedt, who initially mistook the ore for a copper mineral, in the cobalt mines of Los, Hälsingland, Sweden. The element's name comes from a mischievous sprite of German miner folklore, Nickel. Nickel minerals can be green, like copper ores, and were known as kupfernickel – Nickel's copper – because they produced no copper.

Although most nickel in the earth's crust exists as oxides, economically more important nickel ores are sulfides, especially pentlandite. Major production sites include Sulawesi, Indonesia, the Sudbury region of Canada, New Caledonia in the Pacific, Western Australia, and Norilsk, Russia.

Nickel is one of four elements (the others are iron, cobalt, and gadolinium) that are ferromagnetic at about room temperature. Alnico permanent magnets based partly on nickel are of intermediate strength between iron-based permanent magnets and rare-earth magnets. The metal is used chiefly in alloys and corrosion-resistant plating.

About 68% of world production is used in stainless steel. A further 10% is used for nickel-based and copper-based alloys, 9% for plating, 7% for alloy steels, 3% in foundries, and 4% in other applications such as in rechargeable batteries, including those in electric vehicles (EVs). Nickel is widely used in coins, though nickel-plated objects sometimes provoke nickel allergy. As a compound, nickel has a number of niche chemical manufacturing uses, such as a catalyst for hydrogenation, cathodes for rechargeable batteries, pigments and metal surface treatments. Nickel is an essential nutrient for some microorganisms and plants that have enzymes with nickel as an active site.

== Properties ==
=== Atomic and physical properties ===
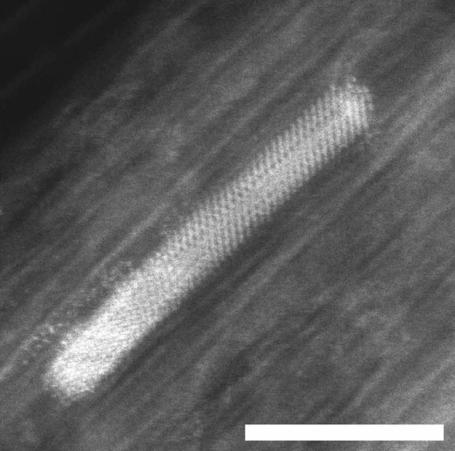
Electron micrograph of a Ni nanocrystal inside a single wall carbon nanotube; scale bar 5 nm

Nickel is a silvery-white metal with a slight golden tinge that takes a high polish. It is one of only four elements that are ferromagnetic at or near room temperature; the others are iron, cobalt and gadolinium. Its Curie temperature is 355 °C (671 °F), meaning that bulk nickel is non-magnetic above this temperature. The unit cell of nickel is a face-centered cube; it has lattice parameter of 0.352 nm, giving an atomic radius of 0.124 nm. This crystal structure is stable to pressures of at least 70 GPa. Nickel is hard, malleable and ductile, and has a relatively high electrical and thermal conductivity for transition metals. The high compressive strength of 34 GPa, predicted for ideal crystals, is never obtained in the real bulk material due to formation and movement of dislocations. However, it has been reached in Ni nanoparticles.

==== Electron configuration dispute ====
Nickel has two atomic electron configurations, [Ar] 3d^{8} 4s^{2} and [Ar] 3d^{9} 4s^{1}, which are very close in energy; [Ar] denotes the complete argon core structure. There is some disagreement on which configuration has the lower energy. Chemistry textbooks quote nickel's electron configuration as [Ar] 4s^{2} 3d^{8}, also written [Ar] 3d^{8} 4s^{2}. This configuration agrees with the Madelung energy ordering rule, which predicts that 4s is filled before 3d. It is supported by the experimental fact that the lowest energy state of the nickel atom is a 3d^{8} 4s^{2} energy level, specifically the 3d^{8}(^{3}F) 4s^{2} ^{3}F, J = 4 level.

However, each of these two configurations splits into several energy levels due to fine structure, and the two sets of energy levels overlap. The average energy of states with [Ar] 3d^{9} 4s^{1} is actually lower than the average energy of states with [Ar] 3d^{8} 4s^{2}. Therefore, the research literature on atomic calculations quotes the ground state configuration as [Ar] 3d^{9} 4s^{1}.

=== Isotopes ===
The isotopes of nickel range in mass number from 48 (^{48}Ni) to 82 (^{82}Ni).

Natural nickel is composed of five stable isotopes, ^{58}Ni, ^{60}Ni, ^{61}Ni, ^{62}Ni and ^{64}Ni, of which ^{58}Ni is the most abundant (68.077% natural abundance).

Nickel-62 has the highest binding energy per nucleon of any nuclide: 8.7946 MeV/nucleon. Its binding energy is greater than both ^{56}Fe and ^{58}Fe, more abundant nuclides often incorrectly cited as having the highest binding energy. Though this would seem to predict nickel as the most abundant heavy element in the universe, the high rate of photodisintegration of nickel in stellar interiors causes iron to be by far the most abundant.

Nickel-60 is the daughter product of the extinct radionuclide ^{60}Fe (half-life 2.6 million years). Due to the long half-life of ^{60}Fe, its persistence in materials in the Solar System may generate observable variations in the isotopic composition of ^{60}Ni. Therefore, the abundance of ^{60}Ni in extraterrestrial material may give insight into the origin of the Solar System and its early history.

At least 26 nickel radioisotopes have been characterized; the most stable are ^{59}Ni with half-life 76,000 years, ^{63}Ni (100 years), and ^{56}Ni (6 days). All other radioisotopes have half-lives less than 60 hours and most these have half-lives less than 30 seconds. This element also has one meta state.

Radioactive nickel-56 is produced by the silicon burning process and later set free in large amounts in Type Ia supernovae. The shape of the light curve of these supernovae at intermediate to late-times corresponds to the decay via electron capture of ^{56}Ni to cobalt-56 and ultimately to iron-56. Nickel-59 is a long-lived cosmogenic radionuclide; half-life 76,000 years. ^{59}Ni has found many applications in isotope geology. ^{59}Ni has been used to date the terrestrial age of meteorites and to determine abundances of extraterrestrial dust in ice and sediment. Nickel-78, with a half-life of 110 milliseconds, is believed an important isotope in supernova nucleosynthesis of elements heavier than iron. ^{48}Ni, discovered in 1999, is the most proton-rich heavy element isotope known. With 28 protons and 20 neutrons, ^{48}Ni is "doubly magic", as is ^{78}Ni with 28 protons and 50 neutrons. Both are therefore unusually stable for nuclei with so large a proton–neutron imbalance.

Nickel-63 is a contaminant found in the support structure of nuclear reactors. It is produced through neutron capture by nickel-62. Small amounts have also been found near nuclear weapon test sites in the South Pacific.

=== Occurrence ===
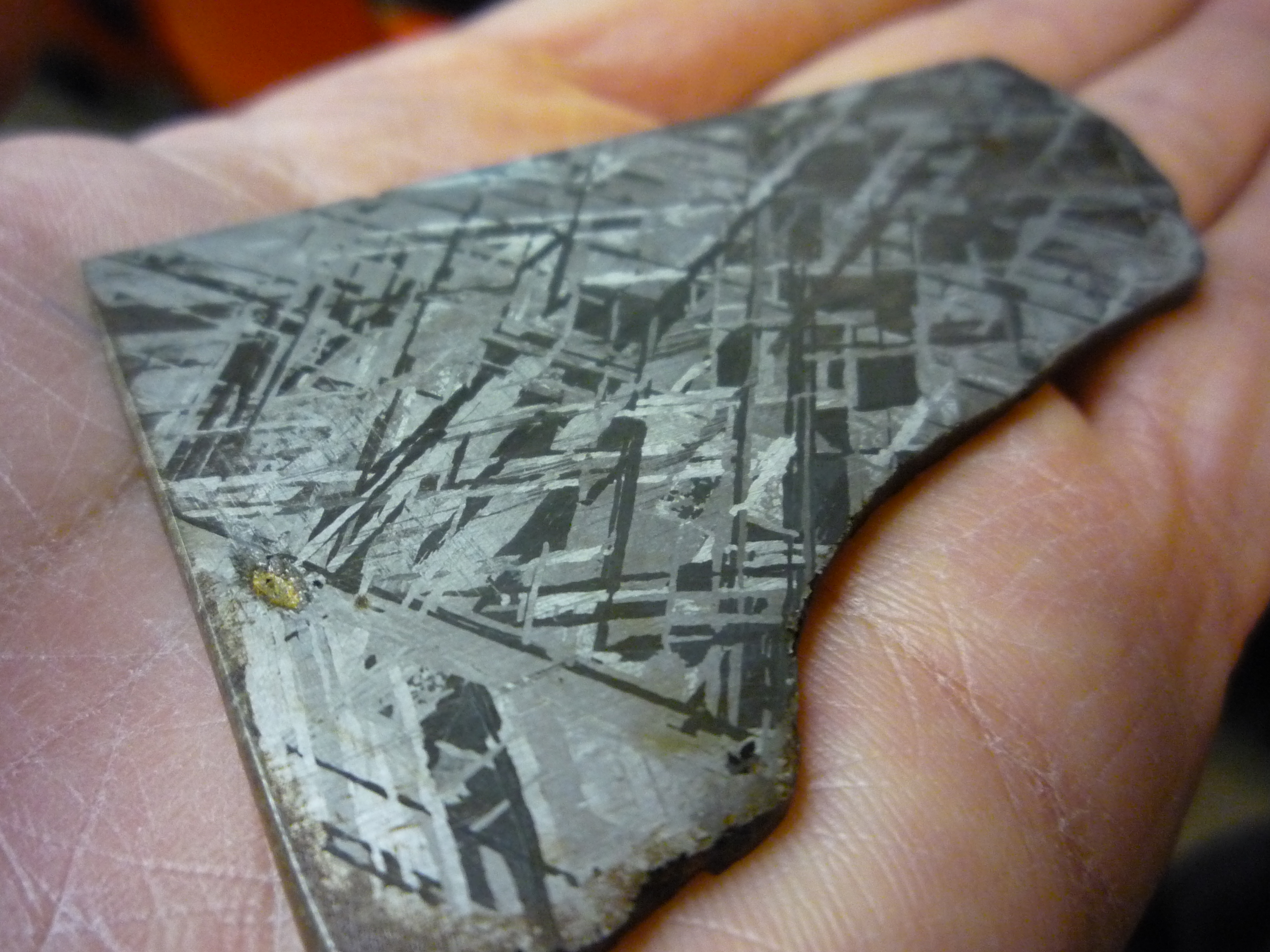
Widmanstätten pattern showing the two forms of nickel–iron, kamacite and taenite, in an octahedrite meteorite

Nickel ores are classified as oxides or sulfides. Oxides include laterite, where the principal mineral mixtures are nickeliferous limonite, (Fe,Ni)O(OH), and garnierite (a mixture of various hydrous nickel and nickel-rich silicates). Nickel sulfides commonly exist as solid solutions with iron in minerals such as pentlandite and pyrrhotite with the formula Fe_{9\−x}Ni_{x}S_{8} and Fe_{7\−x}Ni_{x}S_{6}, respectively. Other common Ni-containing minerals are millerite and the arsenide niccolite.

Identified land-based resources throughout the world averaging 1% nickel or greater comprise at least 130 million tons of nickel (about the double of known reserves). About 60% is in laterites and 40% in sulfide deposits.

On geophysical evidence, most of the nickel on Earth is believed to be in Earth's outer and inner cores. Kamacite and taenite are naturally occurring alloys of iron and nickel. For kamacite, the alloy is usually in the proportion of 90:10 to 95:5, though impurities (such as cobalt or carbon) may be present. Taenite is 20% to 65% nickel. Kamacite and taenite are also found in nickel iron meteorites.

Nickel is commonly found in iron meteorites as the alloys kamacite and taenite. Nickel in meteorites was first detected in 1799 by Joseph-Louis Proust, a French chemist who then worked in Spain. Proust analyzed samples of the meteorite from Campo del Cielo (Argentina), which had been obtained in 1783 by Miguel Rubín de Celis, discovering the presence in them of nickel (about 10%) along with iron.

== Compounds ==
The most common oxidation state of nickel is +2, but compounds of Ni^{0}, Ni^{+}, and Ni^{3+} are well known, and the exotic oxidation states Ni^{2−} and Ni^{−} have been characterized.

=== Nickel(0) ===
Tetracarbonyl nickel

Nickel tetracarbonyl (Ni(CO)_{4}), discovered by Ludwig Mond, is a volatile, highly toxic liquid at room temperature. On heating, the complex decomposes back to nickel and carbon monoxide:

Ni(CO)_{4} ⇌ Ni + 4 CO

This behavior is exploited in the Mond process for purifying nickel. The related nickel(0) complex bis(cyclooctadiene)nickel(0) is a useful catalyst in organonickel chemistry because the cyclooctadiene (or cod) ligands are easily displaced.

=== Nickel(I) ===
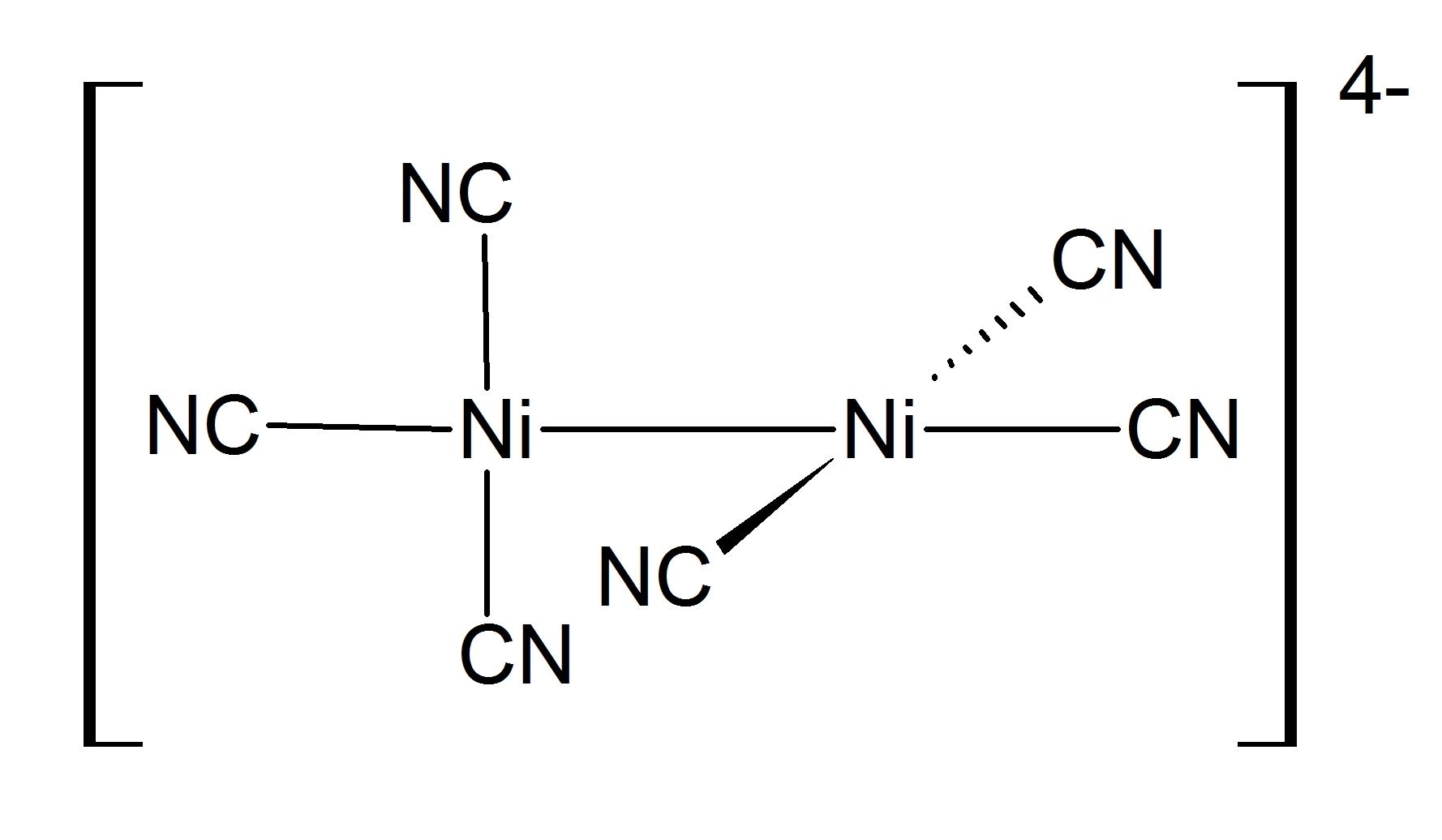
Structure of [Ni_{2}(CN)_{6}]^{4−} ion

Nickel(I) complexes are uncommon, but one example is the tetrahedral complex NiBr(PPh_{3})_{3}. Many nickel(I) complexes have Ni–Ni bonding, such as the dark red diamagnetic K_{4}[Ni_{2}(CN)_{6}] prepared by reduction of K_{2}[Ni_{2}(CN)_{6}] with sodium amalgam. This compound is oxidized in water, liberating H_{2}.

It is thought that the nickel(I) oxidation state is important to nickel-containing enzymes, such as [NiFe]-hydrogenase, which catalyzes the reversible reduction of protons to H_{2}.

=== Nickel(II) ===
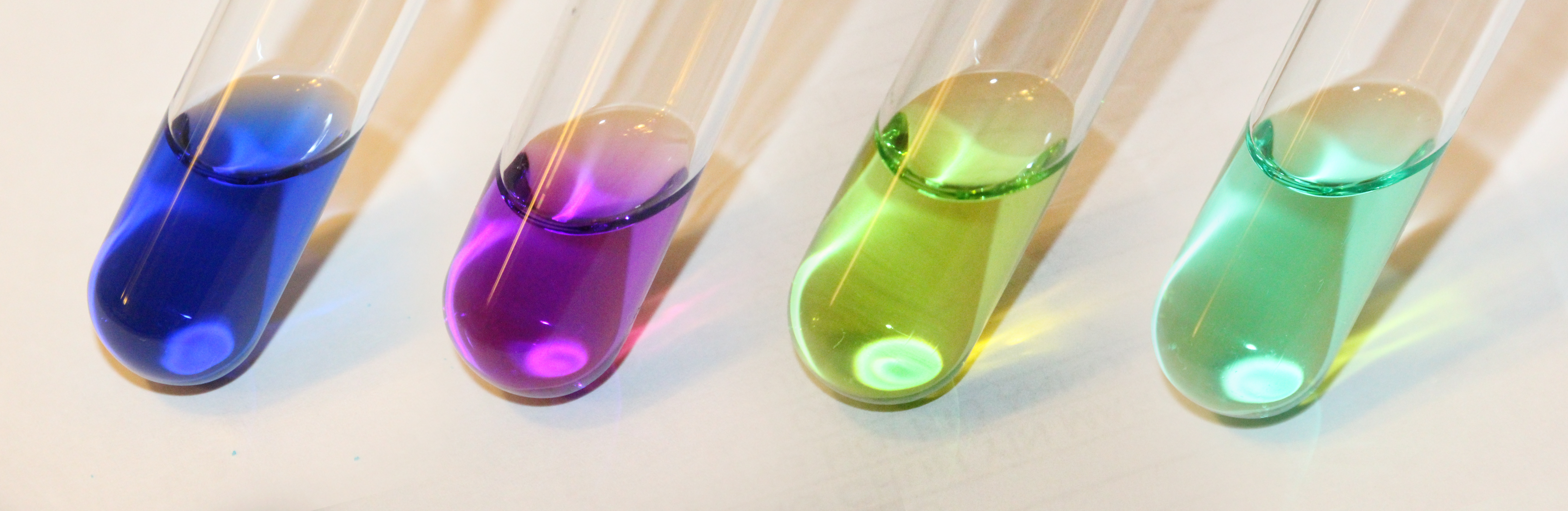
Color of various Ni(II) complexes in aqueous solution. From left to right, [Ni(NH_{3})_{6}]^{2+}, [Ni(NH_{2}CH_{2}CH_{2}NH_{2})_{3}]^{2+}, [Ni(H_{2}O)_{5}Cl]^{+}, [Ni(H_{2}O)_{6}]^{2+}

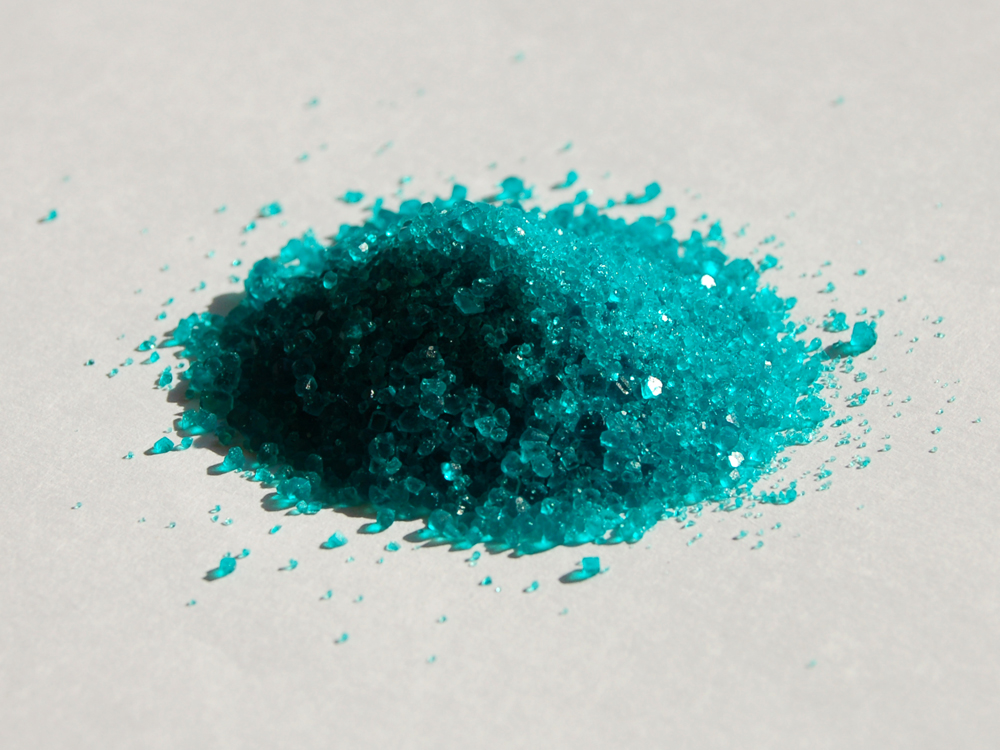
Crystals of hydrated nickel(II) sulfate

Nickel(II) forms compounds with all common anions, including sulfide, sulfate, carbonate, hydroxide, carboxylates, and halides. Nickel(II) sulfate is produced in large amounts by dissolving nickel metal or oxides in sulfuric acid, forming both a hexa- and heptahydrate useful for electroplating nickel. Common salts of nickel, such as chloride, nitrate, and sulfate, dissolve in water to give green solutions of the metal aquo complex [Ni(H_{2}O)_{6}]^{2+}.

The four halides form nickel compounds, which are solids with molecules with octahedral Ni centres. Nickel(II) chloride is most common, and its behavior is illustrative of the other halides. Nickel(II) chloride is made by dissolving nickel or its oxide in hydrochloric acid. It is usually found as the green hexahydrate, whose formula is usually written NiCl_{2}·6H_{2}O. When dissolved in water, this salt forms the metal aquo complex [Ni(H_{2}O)_{6}]^{2+}. Dehydration of NiCl_{2}·6H_{2}O gives yellow anhydrous NiCl_{2}.

Some tetracoordinate nickel(II) complexes, e.g. bis(triphenylphosphine)nickel chloride, exist both in tetrahedral and square planar geometries. The tetrahedral complexes are paramagnetic; the square planar complexes are diamagnetic. In having properties of magnetic equilibrium and formation of octahedral complexes, they contrast with the divalent complexes of the heavier group 10 metals, palladium(II) and platinum(II), which form only square-planar geometry.

Nickelocene has an electron count of 20. Many chemical reactions of nickelocene tend to yield 18-electron products.

=== Nickel(III) and (IV) ===
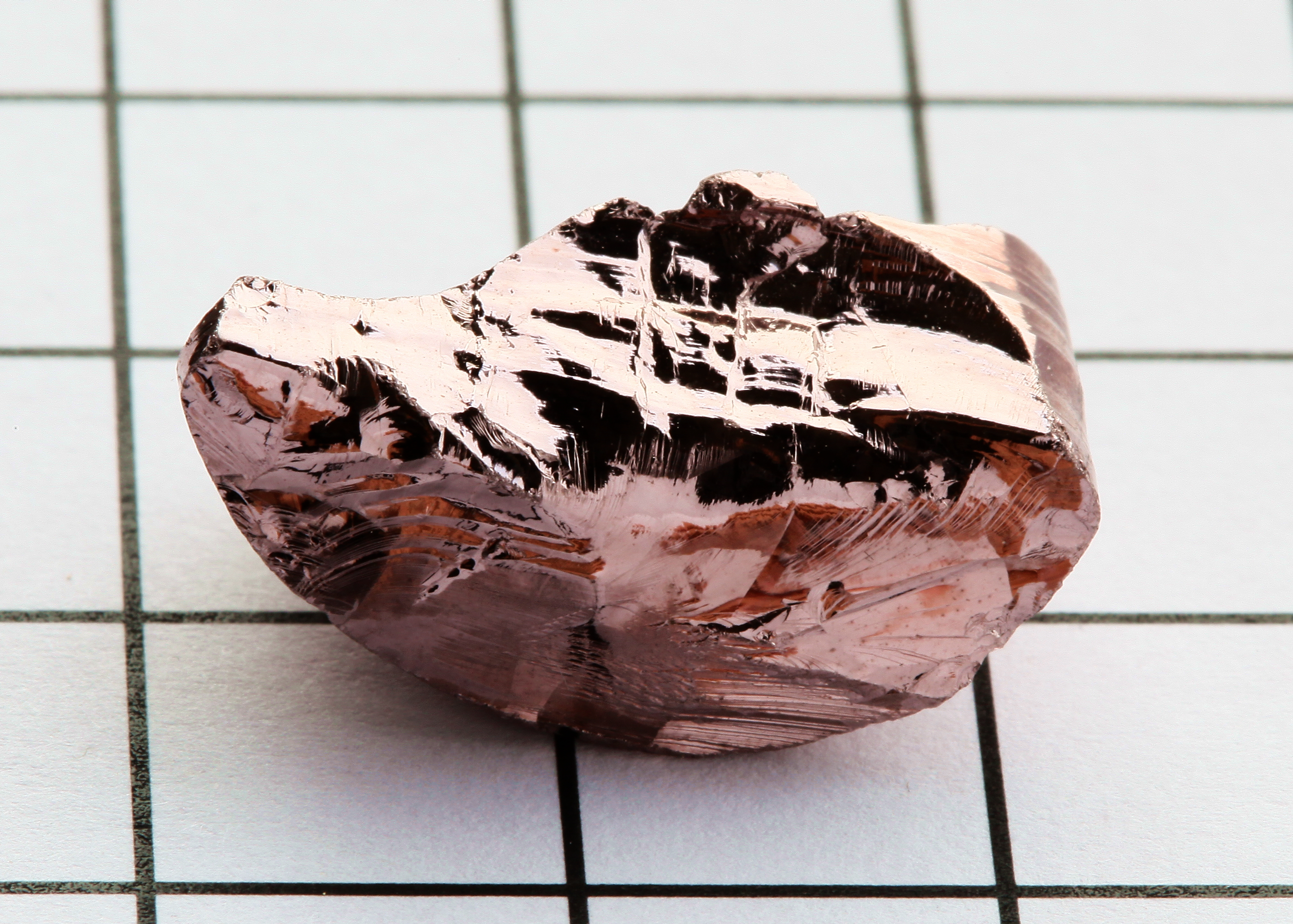
Nickel(III) antimonide

Many Ni(III) compounds are known. Ni(III) forms simple salts with fluoride or oxide ions. Ni(III) can be stabilized by σ-donor ligands such as thiols and organophosphines.

Ni(III) occurs in nickel oxide hydroxide, which is used as the cathode in many rechargeable batteries, including nickel–cadmium, nickel–iron, nickel–hydrogen, and nickel–metal hydride, and used by certain manufacturers in Li-ion batteries.

Ni(IV) remains a rare oxidation state and very few compounds are known. Ni(IV) occurs in the mixed oxide BaNiO_{3}.

=== Hexavalent nickel ===
As of 2024, hexavalent nickel is known in the form of crystalline Ni(BeCp)_{6}. Notably it is not octahedral, instead adopting C_{3v} molecular symmetry.

== History ==
Unintentional use of nickel can be traced back as far as 3500 BCE. Bronzes from what is now Syria have been found to contain as much as 2% nickel. Some ancient Chinese manuscripts suggest that "white copper" (cupronickel, known as baitong) was used there in 1700–1400 BCE. This Paktong white copper was exported to Britain as early as the 17th century, but the nickel content of this alloy was not discovered until 1822. Coins of nickel-copper alloy were minted by Bactrian kings Agathocles, Euthydemus II, and Pantaleon in the 2nd century BCE, possibly out of the Chinese cupronickel.

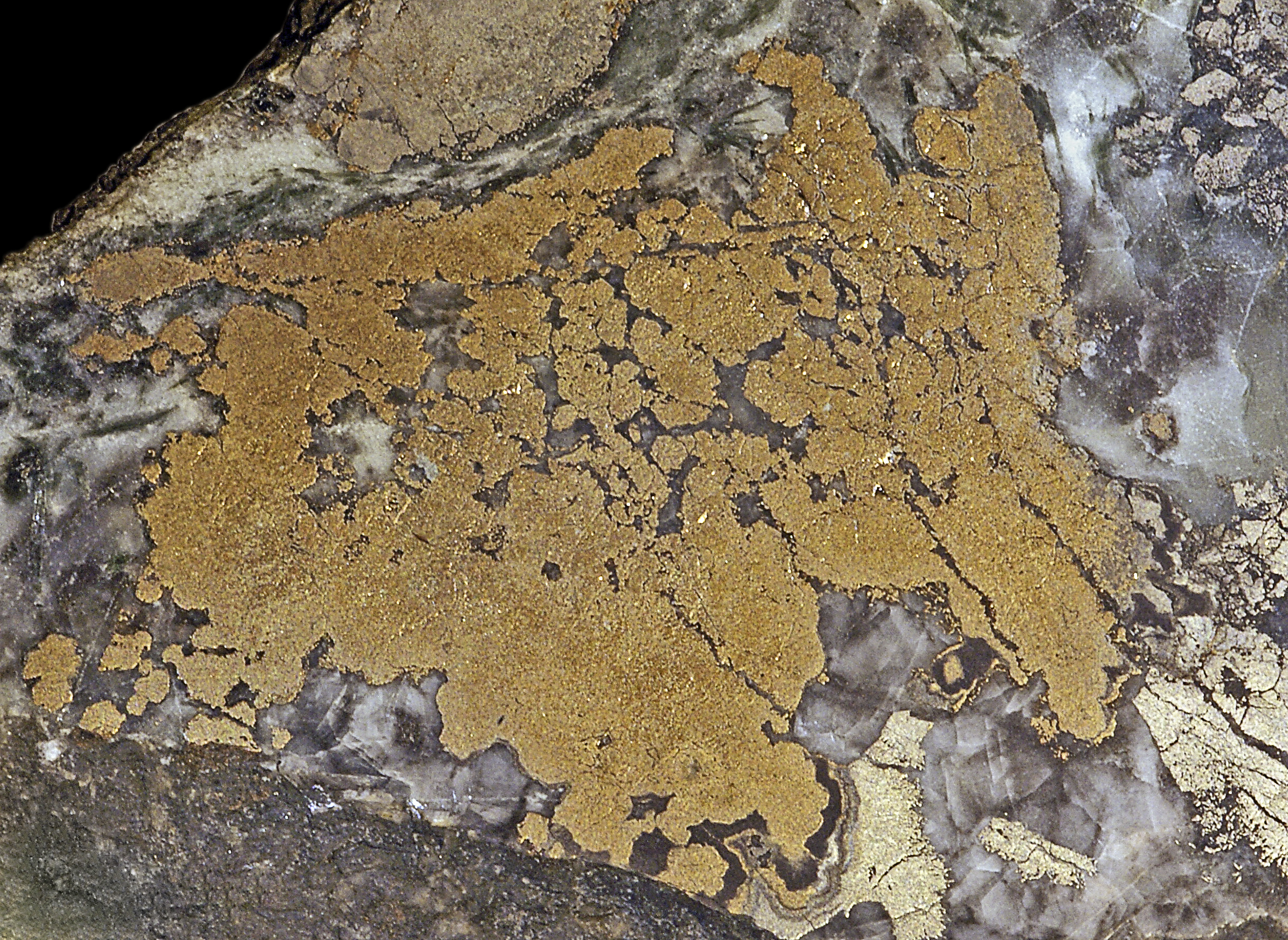
Nickeline/niccolite

In medieval Germany, a metallic yellow mineral was found in the Ore Mountains that resembled copper ore. But when miners were unable to get any copper from it, they blamed a mischievous sprite of German mythology, Nickel (similar to Old Nick), for besetting the copper. They called this ore Kupfernickel from German Kupfer 'copper'. This ore is now known as the mineral nickeline (formerly niccolite), a nickel arsenide. In 1751, Baron Axel Fredrik Cronstedt tried to extract copper from kupfernickel at a cobalt mine in the village of Los, Sweden, and instead produced a white metal that he named nickel after the spirit that had given its name to the mineral. In modern German, Kupfernickel or Kupfer-Nickel designates the alloy cupronickel.

Originally, the only source for nickel was the rare Kupfernickel. Beginning in 1824, nickel was obtained as a byproduct of cobalt blue production. The first large-scale smelting of nickel began in Norway in 1848 from nickel-rich pyrrhotite. The introduction of nickel in steel production in 1889 increased the demand for nickel; the nickel deposits of New Caledonia, discovered in 1865, provided most of the world's supply between 1875 and 1915. The discovery of the large deposits in the Sudbury Basin in Canada in 1883, in Norilsk-Talnakh in Russia in 1920, and in the Merensky Reef in South Africa in 1924 made large-scale nickel production possible.

== Coinage ==
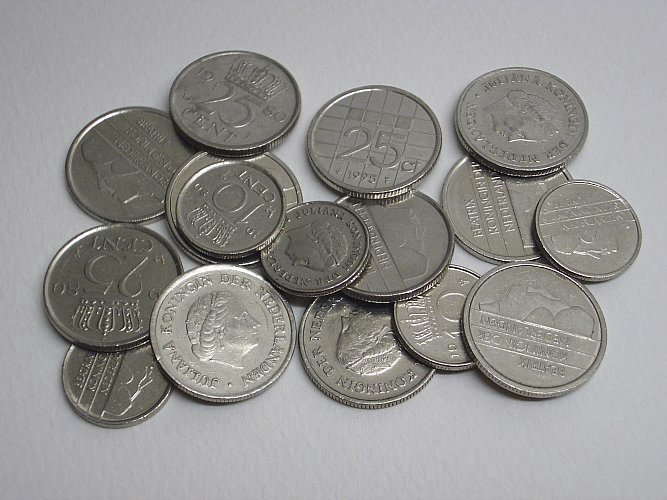
Dutch coins made of pure nickel

Aside from the aforementioned Bactrian coins, nickel was not a component of coins until the mid-19th century.

=== Canada ===
99.9% nickel five-cent coins were struck in Canada (the world's largest nickel producer at the time) during non-war years from 1922 to 1981; the metal content made these coins magnetic. During the war years 1942–1945, most or all nickel was removed from Canadian and US coins to save it for making armor. Canada used 99.9% nickel from 1968 in its higher-value coins until 2000.

=== Switzerland ===
Coins of nearly pure nickel were first used in 1881 in Switzerland.

=== United Kingdom ===
Birmingham forged nickel coins in c. 1833 for trading in Malaysia.

=== United States ===
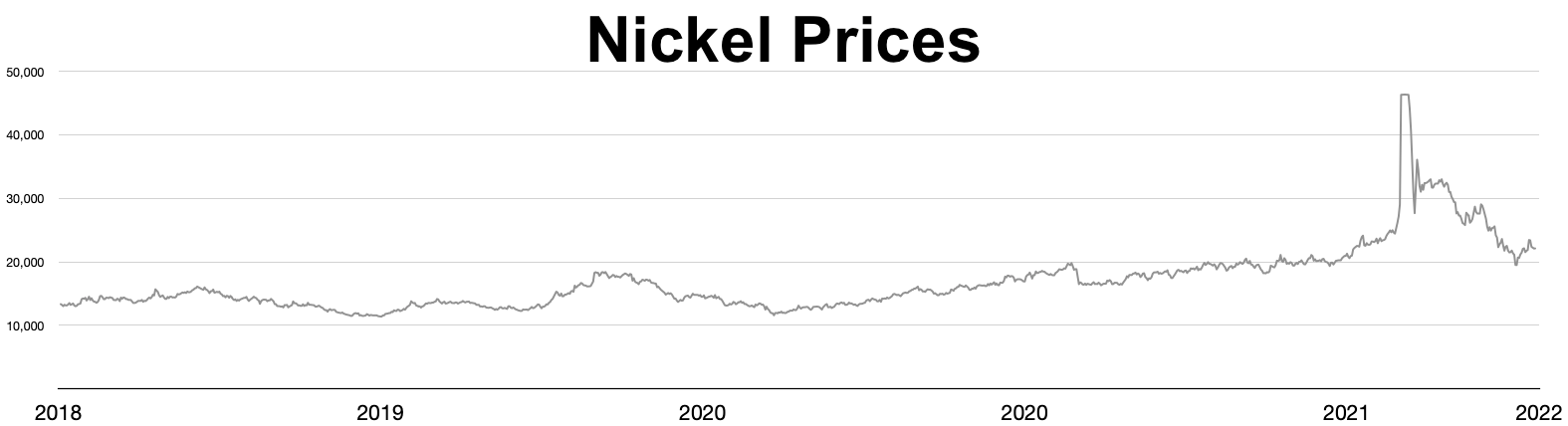
Nickel prices 2018–2022

In the United States, the term "nickel" or "nick" originally applied to the copper-nickel Flying Eagle cent, which replaced copper with 12% nickel 1857–58, then the Indian Head cent of the same alloy from 1859 to 1864. Still later, in 1865, the term designated the three-cent nickel, with nickel increased to 25%. In 1866, the five-cent shield nickel (25% nickel, 75% copper) appropriated the designation, which has been used ever since for the subsequent 5-cent pieces. This alloy proportion is not ferromagnetic.

The US nickel coin contains 0.04 ounces (1.1 g) of nickel, which at the April 2007 price was worth 6.5 cents, along with 3.75 grams of copper worth about 3 cents, with a total metal value of more than 9 cents. Since the face value of a nickel is 5 cents, this made it an attractive target for melting by people wanting to sell the metals at a profit. The United States Mint, anticipating this practice, implemented new interim rules on December 14, 2006, subject to public comment for 30 days, which criminalized the melting and export of cents and nickels. Violators can be punished with a fine of up to $10,000 and/or a maximum of five years in prison. As of February 19, 2025, the melt value of a US nickel (copper and nickel included) is $0.054 (108% of the face value).

=== Current use ===
In the 21st century, the high price of nickel has led to some replacement of the metal in coins around the world. Coins still made with nickel alloys include one- and two-euro coins, 5¢, 10¢, 25¢, 50¢, and $1 U.S. coins, and 20p, 50p, £1, and £2 UK coins. From 2012 on the nickel-alloy used for 5p and 10p UK coins was replaced with nickel-plated steel. This ignited a public controversy regarding the problems of people with nickel allergy.

== World production ==
Interactive nickel production visualization

An estimated 3.9 million tonnes (t) of nickel per year are mined worldwide; Indonesia (2,600,000 t), the Philippines (270,000 t), Russia (200,000 t), Canada (140,000 t), New Caledonia (140,000 t), and China (120,000 t) are the largest producers as of 2025. The largest nickel deposits in non-Russian Europe are in Finland and Greece. Identified land-based sources averaging at least 1% nickel contain at least 130 million tonnes of nickel. About 60% is in laterites and 40% is in sulfide deposits. Also, extensive nickel sources are found in the depths of the Pacific Ocean, especially in an area called the Clarion Clipperton Zone in the form of polymetallic nodules peppering the seafloor at 3.5–6 km below sea level. These nodules are composed of numerous rare-earth metals and are estimated to be 1.7% nickel. With advances in science and engineering, regulation is currently being set in place by the International Seabed Authority to ensure that these nodules are collected in an environmentally conscientious manner while adhering to the United Nations Sustainable Development Goals.

The one place in the United States where nickel has been profitably mined is Riddle, Oregon, with several square miles of nickel-bearing garnierite surface deposits. The mine closed in 1987. The Eagle mine project is a new nickel mine in Michigan's Upper Peninsula. Construction was completed in 2013, and operations began in the third quarter of 2014. In the first full year of operation, the Eagle Mine produced 18,000 t. The Eagle mine produced 17,000 tons of nickel concentrate in 2023. Other projects in the region include the Marquette County nickel project, which received $145 million in funding from the federal government in 2024, investments in work at the Boulderdash and Roland mines, and the development of a third zone, the Keel zone, at The Eagle mine.

== Production ==
Evolution of the annual nickel extraction, according to ores

Nickel is obtained through extractive metallurgy: it is extracted from ore by conventional roasting and reduction processes that yield metal of greater than 75% purity. In many stainless steel applications, 75% pure nickel can be used without further purification, depending on impurities.

Traditionally, most sulfide ores are processed using pyrometallurgical techniques to produce a matte for further refining. Hydrometallurgical techniques are also used. Most sulfide deposits have traditionally been processed by concentration through a froth flotation process followed by pyrometallurgical extraction. The nickel matte is further processed with the Sherritt-Gordon process. First, copper is removed by adding hydrogen sulfide, leaving a concentrate of cobalt and nickel. Then, solvent extraction is used to separate the cobalt and nickel, with the final nickel content greater than 86%.

A second common refining process is leaching the metal matte into a nickel salt solution, followed by electrowinning the nickel from solution by plating it onto a cathode as electrolytic nickel.

=== Mond process ===
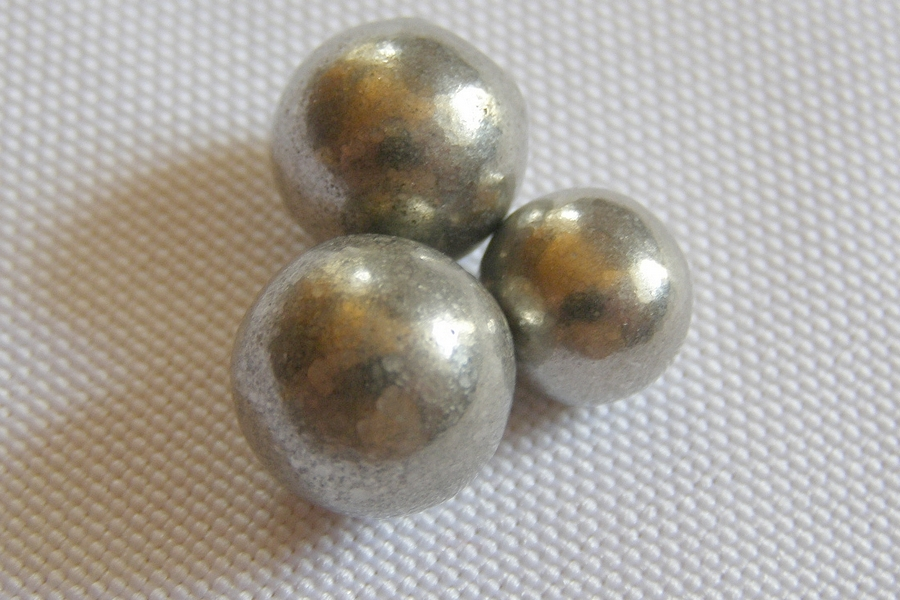
Highly purified nickel spheres made by the Mond process

The purest metal is obtained from nickel oxide by the Mond process, which gives a purity of over 99.99%. The process was patented by Ludwig Mond and has been in industrial use since before the beginning of the 20th century. In this process, nickel is treated with carbon monoxide in the presence of a sulfur catalyst at around 40–80 °C to form nickel carbonyl. In a similar reaction with iron, iron pentacarbonyl can form, though this reaction is slow. If necessary, the nickel may be separated by distillation. Dicobalt octacarbonyl is also formed in nickel distillation as a by-product, but it decomposes to tetracobalt dodecacarbonyl at the reaction temperature to give a non-volatile solid.

Nickel is obtained from nickel carbonyl by one of two processes. It may be passed through a large chamber at high temperatures in which tens of thousands of nickel spheres (pellets) are constantly stirred. The carbonyl decomposes and deposits pure nickel onto the spheres. In the alternate process, nickel carbonyl is decomposed in a smaller chamber at 230 °C to create a fine nickel powder. The byproduct carbon monoxide is recirculated and reused. The highly pure nickel product is known as "carbonyl nickel".

=== Market value ===
American Metal Market predicted in 2001 that the use of nickel-free Nordic gold in Euro coinage would impact the nickel market, estimating 50,000 to 70,000 tonnes of nickel would be scrapped from obsolete coinage in 2002. The market price of nickel surged throughout 2006 and the early months of 2007; as of April 5, 2007, the metal was trading at US$52,300/tonne or $1.47/oz. The price later fell dramatically; as of September 2017, the metal was trading at $11,000/tonne, or $0.31/oz. During the 2022 Russian invasion of Ukraine, worries about sanctions on Russian nickel exports triggered a short squeeze, causing the price of nickel to quadruple in just two days, reaching US$100,000 per tonne. The London Metal Exchange cancelled contracts worth $3.9 billion and suspended nickel trading for over a week. Analyst Andy Home argued that such price shocks are exacerbated by the purity requirements imposed by metal markets: only Grade I (99.8% pure) metal can be used as a commodity on the exchanges, but most of the world's supply is either in ferro-nickel alloys or lower-grade purities. In 2024, the average nickel price is estimated by the London Metal Exchange (LME) to be $15,328 per metric ton, 7.7% less than it was in 2023. At the end of 2024, the price reached its lowest levels since 2020.

== Applications ==
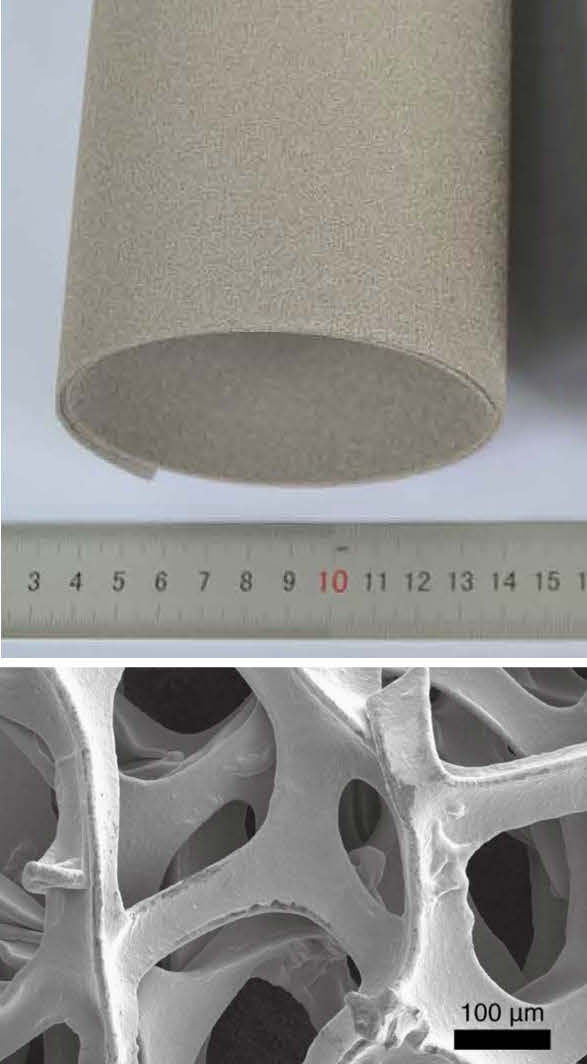
Nickel foam (top) and its internal structure (bottom)

Global use of nickel is currently 68% in stainless steel, 10% in nonferrous alloys, 9% electroplating, 7% alloy steel, 3% foundries, and 4% other (including batteries).

Nickel is used in many recognizable industrial and consumer products, including stainless steel, alnico magnets, coinage, rechargeable batteries (e.g. nickel–iron), electric guitar strings, microphone capsules, plating on plumbing fixtures, and special alloys such as permalloy, elinvar, and invar. It is used for plating and as a green tint in glass. Nickel is preeminently an alloy metal, and its chief use is in nickel steels and nickel cast irons, in which it typically increases the tensile strength, toughness, and elastic limit. It is widely used in many other alloys, including nickel brasses and bronzes and alloys with copper, chromium, aluminium, lead, cobalt, silver, and gold (Inconel, Incoloy, Monel, Nimonic).

Nickel is traditionally used for Kris production in Southeast Asia.

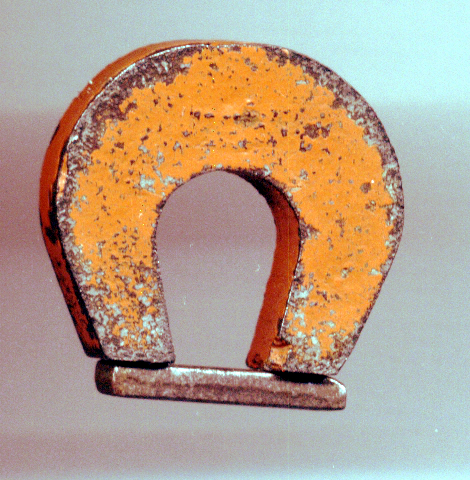
A "horseshoe magnet" made of alnico nickel alloy

Because nickel is resistant to corrosion, it was occasionally used as a substitute for decorative silver. Nickel was also occasionally used in some countries after 1859 as a cheap coinage metal (see above), but in the later years of the 20th century, it was replaced by cheaper stainless steel (i.e., iron) alloys, except in the United States and Canada.

Nickel is an excellent alloying agent for certain precious metals and is used in the fire assay as a collector of platinum group elements (PGE). As such, nickel can fully collect all six PGEs from ores, and can partially collect gold. High-throughput nickel mines may also do PGE recovery (mainly platinum and palladium); examples are Norilsk, Russia and the Sudbury Basin, Canada.

Nickel foam or nickel mesh is used in gas diffusion electrodes for alkaline fuel cells.

Nickel and its alloys are often used as catalysts for hydrogenation reactions. Raney nickel, a finely divided nickel-aluminium alloy, is one common form, though related catalysts are also used, including Raney-type catalysts.

Nickel is naturally magnetostrictive: in the presence of a magnetic field, the material undergoes a small change in length. The magnetostriction of nickel is on the order of 50 ppm and is negative, indicating that it contracts.

Nickel is used as a binder in the cemented tungsten carbide or hardmetal industry and used in proportions of 6% to 12% by weight. Nickel makes the tungsten carbide magnetic and adds corrosion-resistance to the cemented parts, though the hardness is less than those with cobalt binder.

^{63}Ni, with a half-life of 100.1 years, is useful in krytron devices as a beta particle (high-speed electron) emitter to make ionization by the keep-alive electrode more reliable. It is being investigated as a power source for betavoltaic batteries.

Around 27% of all nickel production is used for engineering, 10% for building and construction, 14% for tubular products, 20% for metal goods, 14% for transport, 11% for electronic goods, and 5% for other uses.

In 2025, QuesTek Innovations and Stoke Space developed a nickel-based superalloy for additive manufacturing and extreme high-pressure, high-temperature oxygen environments. Its characteristics allow the material to be used for fully reusable spacecraft launch systems, it can withstand the full-flow staged combustion rocket engine Zenith.

Raney nickel is widely used for hydrogenation of unsaturated oils to make margarine, and substandard margarine and leftover oil may contain nickel as a contaminant. Forte et al. found that type 2 diabetic patients have 0.89 ng/mL of Ni in the blood relative to 0.77 ng/mL in control subjects.

Nickel titanium is an alloy of roughly equal atomic percentages of its constituent metals which exhibits two closely related and unique properties: the shape memory effect and superelasticity.

== Biological role ==
It was not recognized until the 1970s, but nickel is known to play an important role in the biology of some plants, bacteria, archaea, and fungi. Nickel enzymes such as urease are considered virulence factors in some organisms. Urease catalyzes hydrolysis of urea to form ammonia and carbamate. NiFe hydrogenases can catalyze oxidation of H_{2} to form protons and electrons; and also the reverse reaction, the reduction of protons to form hydrogen gas. A nickel-tetrapyrrole coenzyme, cofactor F430, is present in methyl coenzyme M reductase, which can catalyze the formation of methane, or the reverse reaction, in methanogenic archaea (in +1 oxidation state). One of the carbon monoxide dehydrogenase enzymes consists of an Fe-Ni-S cluster. Other nickel-bearing enzymes include a rare bacterial class of superoxide dismutase and glyoxalase I enzymes in bacteria and several eukaryotic trypanosomal parasites (in other organisms, including yeast and mammals, this enzyme contains divalent Zn^{2+}).

Dietary nickel may affect human health through infections by nickel-dependent bacteria, but nickel may also be an essential nutrient for bacteria living in the large intestine, in effect functioning as a prebiotic. The US Institute of Medicine has not confirmed that nickel is an essential nutrient for humans, so neither a Recommended Dietary Allowance (RDA) nor an Adequate Intake have been established. The tolerable upper intake level of dietary nickel is 1 mg/day as soluble nickel salts. Estimated dietary intake is 70 to 100 μg/day; less than 10% is absorbed. What is absorbed is excreted in urine. Relatively large amounts of nickel – comparable to the estimated average ingestion above – leach into food cooked in stainless steel. For example, the amount of nickel leached after 10 cooking cycles into one serving of tomato sauce averages 88 μg.

Nickel released from Siberian Traps volcanic eruptions is suspected of helping the growth of Methanosarcina, a genus of euryarchaeote archaea that produced methane in the Permian–Triassic extinction event, the biggest known mass extinction.

== Toxicity ==
Nickel
Hazards
- GHS labelling
Pictograms	(GHS08: Health hazard) (GHS07: Exclamation mark) (GHS09: Environmental hazard)
Signal word	Danger
Hazard statements	H317, H351, H372, H412
Precautionary statements	P201, P202, P260, P264, P270, P272, P273, P280, P302+P352, P308+P313, P333+P313, P363, P405, P501
NFPA 704 (fire diamond)	2 0 0

The major source of nickel exposure is oral consumption, as nickel is essential to plants. Typical background concentrations of nickel do not exceed 20 ng/m^{3} in air, 100 mg/kg in soil, 10 mg/kg in vegetation, 10 μg/L in freshwater and 1 μg/L in seawater. Environmental concentrations may be increased by human pollution. For example, nickel-plated faucets may contaminate water and soil; mining and smelting may dump nickel into wastewater; nickel–steel alloy cookware and nickel-pigmented dishes may release nickel into food. Air may be polluted by nickel ore refining and fossil fuel combustion. Humans may absorb nickel directly from tobacco smoke and skin contact with jewelry, shampoos, detergents, and coins. A less common form of chronic exposure is through hemodialysis as traces of nickel ions may be absorbed into the plasma from the chelating action of albumin.

The average daily exposure is not a threat to human health. Most nickel absorbed by humans is removed by the kidneys and passed out of the body through urine or is eliminated through the gastrointestinal tract without being absorbed. Nickel is not a cumulative poison, but larger doses or chronic inhalation exposure may be toxic, even carcinogenic, and constitute an occupational hazard.

Nickel compounds are classified as human carcinogens based on increased respiratory cancer risks observed in epidemiological studies of sulfidic ore refinery workers. This is supported by the positive results of the NTP bioassays with Ni sub-sulfide and Ni oxide in rats and mice. The human and animal data consistently indicate a lack of carcinogenicity via the oral route of exposure and limit the carcinogenicity of nickel compounds to respiratory tumours after inhalation. Nickel metal is classified as a suspect carcinogen; there is consistency between the absence of increased respiratory cancer risks in workers predominantly exposed to metallic nickel and the lack of respiratory tumours in a rat lifetime inhalation carcinogenicity study with nickel metal powder. In the rodent inhalation studies with various nickel compounds and nickel metal, increased lung inflammations with and without bronchial lymph node hyperplasia or fibrosis were observed. In rat studies, oral ingestion of water-soluble nickel salts can trigger perinatal mortality in pregnant animals. Whether these effects are relevant to humans is unclear as epidemiological studies of highly exposed female workers have not shown adverse developmental toxicity effects.

People can be exposed to nickel in the workplace by inhalation, ingestion, and contact with skin or eye. The Occupational Safety and Health Administration (OSHA) has set the legal limit (permissible exposure limit) for the workplace at 1 mg/m^{3} per 8-hour workday, excluding nickel carbonyl. The National Institute for Occupational Safety and Health (NIOSH) sets the recommended exposure limit (REL) at 0.015 mg/m^{3} per 8-hour workday. At 10 mg/m^{3}, nickel is immediately dangerous to life and health. Nickel carbonyl [Ni(CO)_{4}] is an extremely toxic gas. The toxicity of metal carbonyls is a function of both the toxicity of the metal and the off-gassing of carbon monoxide from the carbonyl functional groups; nickel carbonyl is also explosive in air.

Sensitized persons may show a skin contact allergy to nickel known as a contact dermatitis. Highly sensitized persons may also react to foods with high nickel content. Patients with pompholyx may also be sensitive to nickel. Nickel is the top confirmed contact allergen worldwide, partly due to its use in jewelry for pierced ears. Nickel allergies affecting pierced ears are often marked by itchy, red skin. Many earrings are now made without nickel or with low-release nickel to address this problem. The amount allowed in products that contact human skin is now regulated by the European Union. In 2002, researchers found that the nickel released by 1 and 2 euro coins, far exceeded those standards. This is believed to be due to a galvanic reaction. Nickel was voted Allergen of the Year in 2008 by the American Contact Dermatitis Society. In August 2015, the American Academy of Dermatology adopted a position statement on the safety of nickel: "Estimates suggest that contact dermatitis, which includes nickel sensitization, accounts for approximately $1.918 billion and affects nearly 72.29 million people."

Reports show that both the nickel-induced activation of hypoxia-inducible factor (HIF-1) and the up-regulation of hypoxia-inducible genes are caused by depletion of intracellular ascorbate. The addition of ascorbate to the culture medium increased the intracellular ascorbate level and reversed both the metal-induced stabilization of HIF-1- and HIF-1α-dependent gene expression.
