= Javier Llorca =

Spanish Materials Scientist

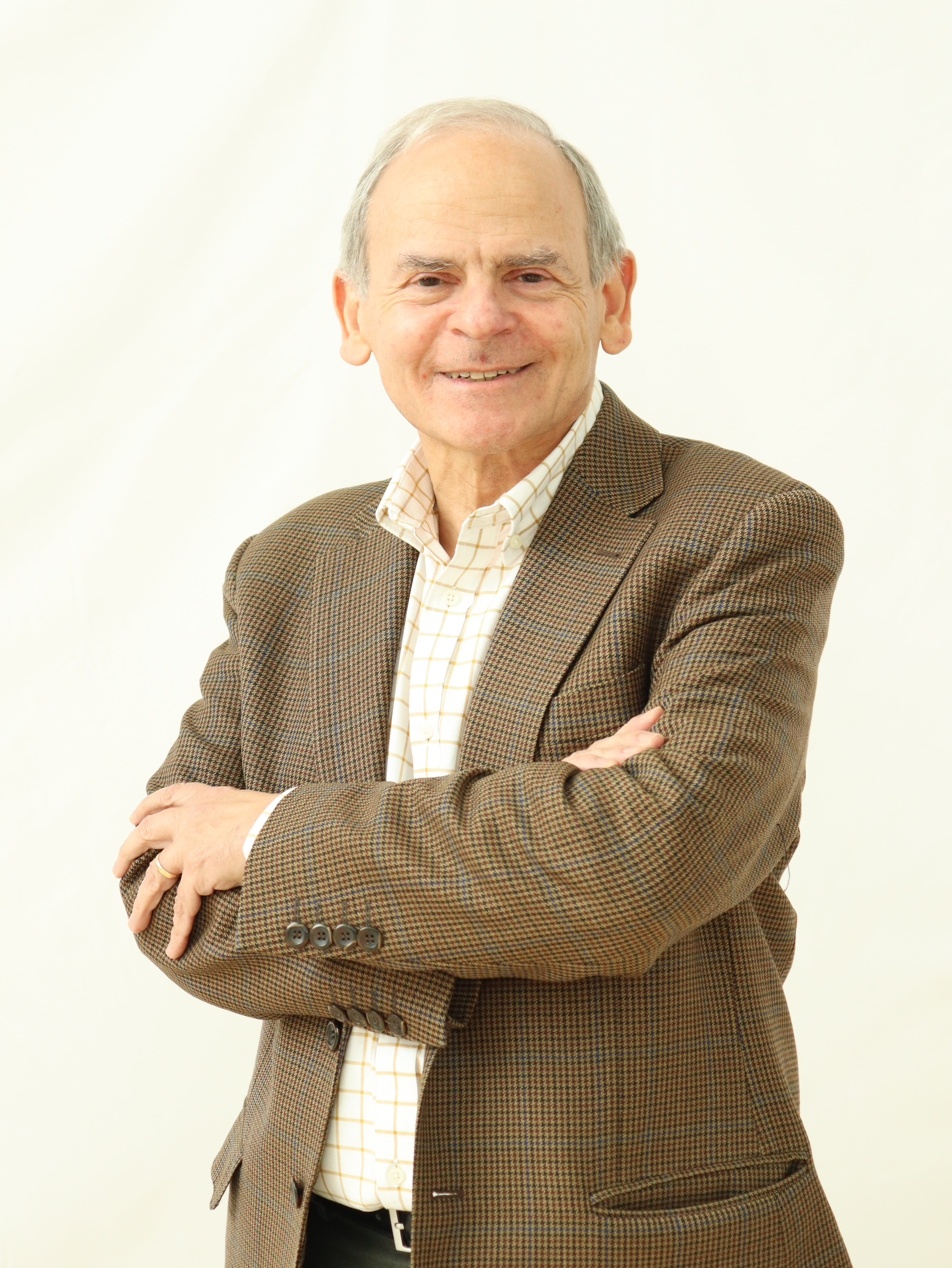
IMDEA Materials Scientific Director, Prof. Javier LLorca, at the Madrid-based institute in 2023.

Javier LLorca (born February 26, 1960, in Spain) is a Spanish engineer and materials scientist. He is Scientific Director of the Madrid Advanced Studies Institute of Materials (IMDEA Materials Institute]) in Madrid, Spain, and Principal Investigator of the institute's Bio/Chemo/Mechanics of Materials research group. He is also Professor of Materials Science and the Head of the Advanced Structural Materials and Nanomaterials research group at the Technical University of Madrid (UPM).

== Education ==
LLorca attended the UPM, from which he received an honours degree in civil engineering in 1983 and a doctorate in materials science in 1986.

== Career ==
Llorca began his academic career after receiving his doctorate from UPM, becoming an associate professor in the university's Department of Materials Science in 1987. From 1989 to 1990, LLorca was a Fulbright Visiting Scholar in solid mechanics in the Division of Engineering at Brown University. In 1995, he became a full professor at UPM.

In 2007, Llorca founded IMDEA Materials Institute. He served as the institute's director until 2017, at which point he took on the role of scientific director.

In the field of integrated computational materials engineering, LLorca has been recognised for his work in the systematic application of advanced computational tools and multiscale modelling strategies to establish links between the processing, microstructure and mechanical behaviour of structural materials.

This research activity has impacted several fields, including the development of multiscale modelling strategies to simulate the mechanical behaviour of composites for structural and multifunctional applications, which are considered the foundation of the virtual testing techniques to save time and cost in the certification of composite structures.

In 2015, LLorca was awarded an Advanced Grant from the European Research Council. It was found to be possible to predict the microstructure and mechanical properties of metallic alloys using a cascade of modelling strategies covering different length and time scales.

== Honours ==
In 2023, LLorca was awarded the Leonardo Torres Quevedo National Prize in Engineering and Architecture by the Spanish Ministry of Science and Innovation, before receiving the Morris Cohen Award of The Minerals, Metals and Materials Society, as well as the Science and Technology Award from the International Magnesium Society in 2024. In 2025, he was recognised by the Community of Madrid with the Research Prize Miguel Catalán 2025 for his scientífic career. In receiving the award he was noted as: "a pioneer in the systematic application of computational tools and multiscale simulation strategies for the design and processing of structural materials." He was elected to the Academia Europaea (Physics and Engineering section) in 2013. He is a Fellow of the European Mechanics Society and in 2019 was the first Spanish researcher elected Fellow at the Materials Research Society. In 2026, LLorca was included in the UPM's Hall of Distinguished People, where he was noted as a pioneer of computational materials engineering.
