= Xiaogang Ma =

Chinese computer scientist

- 马小刚
- Born: 1980 (age 45–46); Tianmen, Hubei, China
- Other name: Marshall Ma
- Education: Rensselaer Polytechnic Institute, ITC, University of Twente, China University of Geosciences (Wuhan)
- Awards: AGU Charles S. Falkenberg Award, GSA M. Lee Allison Award, IAMG Andrei B. Vistelius Award, ISC World Data System Data Stewardship Award, SciTS Meritorious Contribution Award
- Scientific career
- Fields: Data science, Geoinformatics, Cyberinfrastructure
- Workplaces: University of Idaho; Rensselaer Polytechnic Institute; ITC, University of Twente
- Doctoral advisor: Freek van der Meer, John Carranza, Chonglong Wu
- Other academic advisors: Peter Fox (Postdoctoral Mentor)
- Website: www.uidaho.edu/people/max

Xiaogang Ma (Chinese: 马小刚; born 1980) or Marshall Ma is a data science and geoinformatics researcher. He is currently a professor in the department of computer science at the University of Idaho (UI), United States, and also affiliates with the department of earth and spatial sciences and several research institutes and centers at the university.

== Early life and education ==
Ma was born in Tianmen, an inland county in Central China. He finished college and graduate studies at China University of Geosciences (Wuhan) in the early 2000s. Then in 2007 he went to ITC, the Netherlands for PhD study, originally affiliating with Utrecht University and then University of Twente. In 2011, he was awarded a PhD degree of Earth System Science and GIScience from University of Twente with his dissertation "Ontology Spectrum for Geological Data Interoperability". In early 2012, Ma joined the Tetherless World Constellation at Rensselaer Polytechnic Institute (RPI) as a postdoctorate fellow, with financial supports from the Sloan Foundation and NSF. At RPI, he received intensive training of data science methods and semantic technologies, and he participated and led several research projects. In 2014, Ma was promoted to associate research scientist at RPI.

== Career ==
Ma's research addresses the needs of methods and building blocks in the cyberinfrastructure ecosystem to facilitate data science. At RPI, he took leadership roles for ontology development in the Global Change Information System of the U.S. Global Change Research Program and data science activities of the Sloan-funded Deep Carbon Observatory. He also taught a data analytics course for the Department of Earth and Environmental Sciences at RPI.

In 2016, Ma joined the Department of Computer Science at University of Idaho (UI). He continued his research on data science and geoinformatics at UI, including knowledge graphs, open data, and algorithms for spatio-temporal analysis, and he created several new courses related to data science and open data. In 2016 and 2017 Ma was an affiliate scientist with MILES - Managing Idaho's Landscapes for Ecosystem Services project, where he contributed to the cyberinfrastructure development. In 2018, he co-initiated the U.S. Semantic Technologies Symposium (US2TS) and received sponsorship from NSF, the Sloan Foundation, and Elsevier's Artificial Intelligence journal. Since 2017, Ma has worked intensively on the deep-time data science, with several projects funded by NSF and NASA, including the OpenMindat project to provide open access to the data of Mindat.org, the largest database of minerals in the world. He has also been active in community programs or initiatives, including the Deep-Time Data Infrastructure, the Deep-time Data Driven Discoveries, and the IUGS Deep-time Digital Earth. In 2020 and 2021, Ma led a team of researchers from four U.S. universities and received a multi-million grant from NSF to conduct cross-disciplinary data science studies on climate change, ecology, biology, socioeconomics, and public health.

Ma is co-Editor-in-Chief of the journal Applied Computing & Geosciences, and associate editor or editorial board member for several others, including Computers & Geosciences, Data Science Journal, Earth Science Informatics, and Big Earth Data. He has been the Chair of the Semantic Technologies Committee of the Earth Science Information Partners (ESIP) since 2023. Previously, he served as voting councilor (2016-2020) of IAMG and chair (2019-2025) for its Awards Committee, Chair of the Geoinformatics and Data Science Division of the Geological Society of America, Chair of the Task Group for Coordinating Data Standards amongst Scientific Unions under CODATA, and Member of the Independent Review Board for NASA's Planetary Data Ecosystem. Ma is also active in several other data science and geoinformatics communities, including the American Geophysical Union, the Research Data Alliance, and the IUGS Commission for the Management and Application of Geoscience Information.

== Representative publications ==
=== Books, book chapters & journal special issues ===
- 2024: "Geoscience Ontologies and Knowledge Graphs" (lead editor), Elsevier. Special Issue of Applied Computing & Geosciences, ISSN 2590-1974
- 2024: "Progress of Geoinformatics in Earth and Environmental Sciences" (lead editor), Springer. Special Issue of Earth Science Informatics, ISSN 1865-0473
- 2023: "Advances in Geoscience Ontologies and Knowledge Graphs" (co-editor), Springer. Special Issue of Journal of Earth Science, Volume 34, Issue 5. ISSN 1867-111X
- 2023: "Encyclopedia of Mathematical Geosciences" (section editor - geoinformatics), Springer, Cham, Switzerland
- 2023: "The Geoscience Knowledge System, Ontology and Knowledge Graph for Data-driven Discovery" (co-editor), Elsevier. Special Issue of Geoscience Frontiers, ISSN 2588-9192
- 2023: "Provenance in Earth AI", Artificial Intelligence in Earth Science, Elsevier, Amsterdam
- 2023: "Recent Advancement in Geoinformatics and Data Science" (lead editor), GSA Special Paper Book V. 558, Boulder, CO, USA
- 2018: "Data Science for Geoscience: Leveraging Mathematical Geosciences with Semantics and Open Data", Handbook of Mathematical Geosciences: Fifty Years of IAMG, Springer, Berlin
- 2015: "Semantic eScience" (lead editor), Springer. Special Issue of Earth Science Informatics, ISSN 1865-0473
- 2011: "Ontology Spectrum for Geological Data Interoperability", PhD Dissertation at ITC, University of Twente, Enschede, Netherlands, 184p., ISBN 978-90-6164-323-4

=== Journal articles & commentaries ===
- 2022: "Data sharing: more science unions must act", Nature, 610(7931), 257 preprint | supplementary material
- 2022: "Knowledge graph construction and application in geosciences: A review", Computers & Geosciences, 161, 105082
- 2018: "Information extraction and knowledge graph construction from geoscience literature", Computers & Geosciences, 112, 112-120
- 2014: "Capturing provenance of global change information", Nature Climate Change, 4(6), 409-413

== Awards ==
- 2025 Charles S. Falkenberg Award, American Geophysical Union
- 2024 Best Paper Award, Geoscience Information Society
- 2024 M. Lee Allison Award of Geoinformatics, Geological Society of America
- 2024 Presidential Mid-Career Award, University of Idaho
- 2023 Excellence in Interdisciplinary and Collaborative Efforts Award, University of Idaho
- 2023 Postdoctoral Mentoring Award, University of Idaho
- 2021 Outstanding Early-Career Faculty, University of Idaho College of Engineering
- 2018 SciTS Meritorious Contribution Award, Science of Team Science Conference
- 2015 Andrei B. Vistelius Research Award, International Association for Mathematical Geosciences
- 2014 Data Stewardship Award, International Council for Science World Data System
- 2012 Funding Friday Research Grant, Federation of Earth Science Information Partners
