= Karl Gerald van den Boogaart =

German mathematician

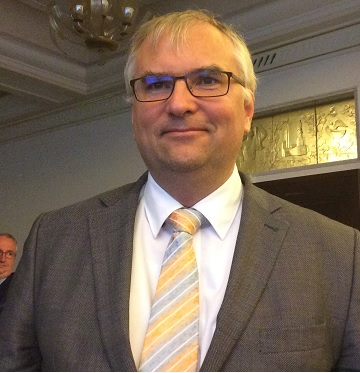
- van den Boogaart in Prague in 2018
- Born: 1971 (age 54–55); Augsburg, Germany
- Education: Augsburg University; TU Bergakademie Freiberg
- Known for: Geostatistics; Spatial Statistics
- Awards: Andrei Borisovich Vistelius Research Award; Georges Matheron Lectureship Award
- Scientific career
- Fields: Geostatistics; Spatial Statistics
- Workplaces: TU Bergakademie Freiberg

Karl Gerald van den Boogaart is currently working as a Professor, TU Bergakademie Freiberg, Germany. Boogart was a recipient of the Andrei Borisovich Vistelius Research Award in 2003, and in 2014 he was selected to receive Georges Matheron Lectureship Award from the International Association for Mathematical Geosciences.

== Education ==
- MS in Mathematics and Geography, in 1998, University of Augsburg
- PhD in Spatial Statistics, in 2001 TU Bergakademie Freiberg
