= Antonella Buccianti =

Italian statistician and earth scientist

Antonella Buccianti (born 1960) is an Italian statistician and earth scientist, known for her work on the statistics of compositional data and its applications in geochemistry and geostatistics. She is an associate professor in the department of earth sciences at the University of Florence.

== Education and career ==
Buccianti was born on 7 August 1960 in Florence. She earned a master's degree in stratigraphy from the University of Florence in 1988, including work done as a student with Agip, and completed a PhD at the University of Florence in 1994. She obtained a permanent research position at the university in 2001.

== Books ==
Buccianti is the co-author, with Fabio Rosso, Fabio Vlacci, of the three-volume Italian book Metodi matematici e statistici nelle scienze della terra (2000). She is co-editor of Compositional Data Analysis in the Geosciences: From Theory to Practice (Geological Society, 2006) and Compositional Data Analysis: Theory and Applications (Wiley, 2011).

== Recognition ==
Buccianti was the 2003 winner of the Felix Chayes Prize of the International Association for Mathematical Geosciences.
