= Jef Caers =

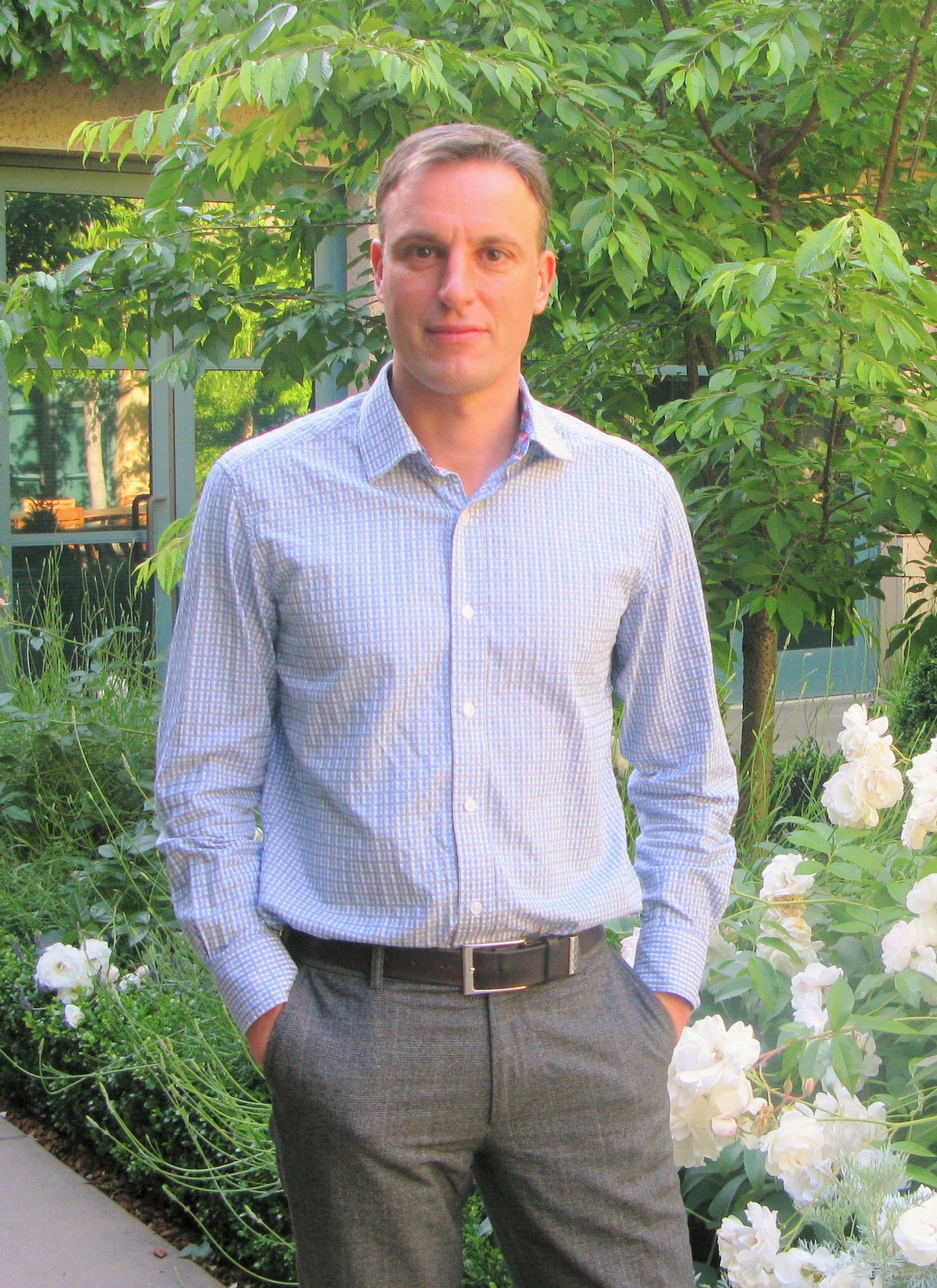
- Jef Caers in California, 2015
- Born: Belgium
- Education: Katholieke Universiteit Leuven
- Known for: Geostatistics; Spatial Modeling; Modeling Uncertainty
- Awards: Krumbein Medal; Andrei Borisovich Vistelius Research Award
- Scientific career
- Workplaces: Stanford University; University of Calgary
- Website: https://earth.stanford.edu/jef-caers

Jef Caers, born in Belgium, is an academic working as a professor at the School of Earth, Energy & Environmental Sciences, Stanford University. He was awarded the Andrei Borisovich Vistelius Research Award and the William Christian Krumbein Medal by the International Association for Mathematical Geosciences in 2001 and 2014 respectively. He is Editor-in-Chief of Computers & Geosciences.

== Education ==
Ph.D. in engineering, 1997, Katholieke Universiteit Leuven, Belgium
M.S. in Mining Engineering & Geophysics, 1993, Katholieke Universiteit Leuven, Belgium

== Research ==
His research interests include geostatistics, spatial modeling and modeling uncertainty.

== Employment ==
2015–Present, Professor, Department of Geological Sciences, Stanford University
2014–2015, Professor, Energy Resources Engineering, Stanford University
2006–2013, Associate Professor, Energy Resources Engineering, Stanford University
2000–Present, Director, Stanford Center for Reservoir Forecasting, Stanford University
1999–2005, Assistant Professor, Petroleum Engineering, Stanford University
1997–1999, Postdoctoral Scholar, Department of Geological and Environmental Sciences, Stanford University
1997, Post-doctoral researcher, Department of Civil Engineering, University of Calgary, Canada
1997–1999, Post-doctoral Fellow of the National Science Foundation of Belgium
1997–1998, Research Fellow of the NATO

== Selected books ==
Jef Caers, 2005, "Petroleum Geostatistics”, Society for Petroleum Engineers, p. 96.
Jef Caers, 2011, “Modeling Uncertainty in the Earth Sciences”, (Wiley-Blackwell), p. 246.
G. Mariethoz and Jef Caers, 2014, "Multiple-point Geostatistics: stochastic modeling with training images", Wiley-Blackwell, p. 400.
