= Integrated computational materials engineering =

Integrated Computational Materials Engineering (ICME) is an approach to design products, the materials that comprise them, and their associated materials processing methods by linking materials models at multiple length scales. Key words are "Integrated", involving integrating models at multiple length scales, and "Engineering", signifying industrial utility. The focus is on the materials, i.e. understanding how processes produce material structures, how those structures give rise to material properties, and how to select materials for a given application. The key links are process-structures-properties-performance. The National Academies report describes the need for using multiscale materials modeling to capture the process-structures-properties-performance of a material.

== Standardization in ICME ==
A fundamental requirement to meet the ambitious ICME objective of designing materials for specific products resp. components is an integrative and interdisciplinary computational description of the history of the component starting from the sound initial condition of a homogeneous, isotropic and stress free melt resp. gas phase and continuing via subsequent processing steps and eventually ending in the description of failure onset under operational load.

Integrated Computational Materials Engineering is an approach to design products, the materials that comprise them, and their associated materials processing methods by linking materials models at multiple length scales. ICME thus naturally requires the combination of a variety of models and software tools. It is thus a common objective to build up a scientific network of stakeholders concentrating on boosting ICME into industrial application by defining a common communication standard for ICME relevant tools.

== Standardization of information exchange ==
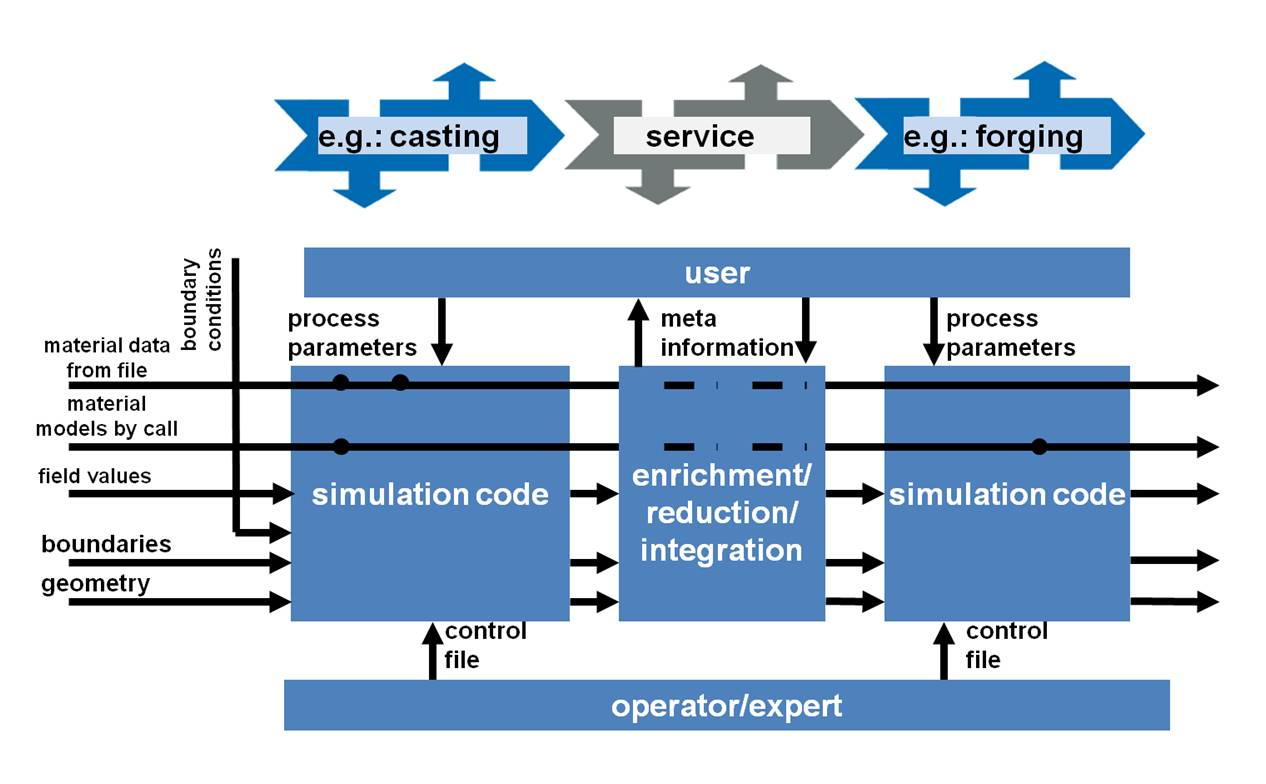

Efforts to generate a common language by standardizing and generalizing data formats for the exchange of simulation results represent a major mandatory step towards successful future applications of ICME. A future, structural framework for ICME comprising a variety of academic and/or commercial simulation tools operating on different scales and being modular interconnected by a common language in form of standardized data exchange will allow integrating different disciplines along the production chain, which by now have only scarcely interacted. This will substantially improve the understanding of individual processes by integrating the component history originating from preceding steps as the initial condition for the actual process. Eventually this will lead to optimized process and production scenarios and will allow effective tailoring of specific materials and component properties.

=== The ICMEg project and its mission ===
The ICMEg project aims to build up a scientific network of stakeholders concentrating on boosting ICME into industrial application by defining a common communication standard for ICME relevant tools. Eventually this will allow stakeholders from electronic, atomistic, mesoscopic and continuum communities to benefit from sharing knowledge and best practice and thus to promote a deeper understanding between the different communities of materials scientists, IT engineers and industrial users.

ICMEg will create an international network of simulation providers and users. It will promote a deeper understanding between the different communities (academia and industry) each of them by now using very different tools/methods and data formats. The harmonization and standardization of information exchange along the life-cycle of a component and across the different scales (electronic, atomistic, mesoscopic, continuum) are the key activity of ICMEg.

The mission of ICMEg is

- to establish and to maintain a network of contacts to simulation software providers, governmental and international standardization authorities, ICME users, associations in the area of materials and processing, and academia
- to define and communicate an ICME language in form of an open and standardized communication protocol
- to stimulate knowledge sharing in the field of multiscale materials design
- to identify missing tools, models and functionalities and propose a roadmap for their development
- to discuss and to decide about future amendments to the initial standard

The activities of ICMEg include

- Organization of International Workshops on Software Solutions for Integrated Computational Materials Engineering
- Conducting market study and survey on available simulation software for ICME
- Create and maintain forum for knowledge sharing in ICME

The ICMEg project ended in October 2016. Its major outcomes are

- a Handbook of Software Solutions for ICME
- the identification of HDF5 as a suitable communication file standard for microstructure information exchange in ICME settings
- the specification of a metadata description for microstructures
- a network of stakeholders in the area of ICME

Most of the activities being launched in the ICMEg project are continued by the European Materials Modelling Council and in the MarketPlace project

== Multiscale modeling in material processing ==
Multiscale modeling aims to evaluate material properties or behavior on one level using information or models from different levels and properties of elementary processes. Usually, the following levels, addressing a phenomenon over a specific window of length and time, are recognized:

- Structural scale: Finite element, finite volume and finite difference partial differential equation are solvers used to simulate structural responses such as solid mechanics and transport phenomena at large (meters) scales.
  - process modeling/simulations: extrusion, rolling, sheet forming, stamping, casting, welding, etc.
  - product modeling/simulations: performance, impact, fatigue, corrosion, etc.
- Macroscale: constitutive (rheology) equations are used at the continuum level in solid mechanics and transport phenomena at millimeter scales.
- Mesoscale: continuum level formulations are used with discrete quantities at multiple micrometer scales. "Meso" is an ambiguous term that means "intermediate" so it has been used as representing different intermediate scales. In this context, it can represent modeling from crystal plasticity for metals, Eshelby solutions for any materials, homogenization methods, and unit cell methods.
- Microscale: modeling techniques that represent the micrometer scale such as dislocation dynamics codes for metals and phase field models for multiphase materials. Phase field models of phase transitions and microstructure formation and evolution on nanometer to millimeter scales.
- Nanoscale: semi-empirical atomistic methods are used such as Lennard-Jones, Brenner potentials, embedded atom method (EAM) potentials, and modified embedded atom potentials (MEAM) in molecular dynamics (MD), molecular statics (MS), Monte Carlo (MC), and kinetic Monte Carlo (KMC) formulations.
- Electronic scale: Schroedinger equations are used in a computational framework as density functional theory (DFT) models of electron orbitals and bonding on angstrom to nanometer scales.

There are some software codes that operate on different length scales such as:

- CALPHAD computational thermodynamics for prediction of equilibrium phase diagrams and even non-equilibrium phases.
- Phase field codes for simulation of microstructure evolution
- Databases of processing parameters, microstructure features, and properties from which one can draw correlations at various length scales
- GeoDict - The Digital Material Laboratory by Math2Market
- VPS-MICRO is a multiscale probabilistic fracture mechanics software.
- SwiftComp is a multiscale constitutive modeling software based on mechanics of structure genome.
- Digimat is a multiscale material modeling platform

A comprehensive compilation of software tools with relevance for ICME is documented in the Handbook of Software Solutions for ICME

== Examples of Model integration ==
- Small scale models calculate material properties, or relationships between properties and parameters, e.g. yield strength vs. temperature, for use in continuum models
- CALPHAD computational thermodynamics software predicts free energy as a function of composition; a phase field model then uses this to predict structure formation and development, which one may then correlate with properties.
- An essential ingredient to model microstructure evolution by phase field models and other microstructre evolution codes are the initial and boundary conditions. While boundary conditions may be taken e.g. from the simulation of the actual process, the initial conditions (i.e. the initial microstructure entering into the actual process step) involve the entire integrated process history starting from the homogeneous, isotropic and stress free melt. Thus - for a successful ICME - an efficient exchange of information along the entire process chain and across all relevant length scales is mandatory. The models to be combined for this purpose comprise both academic and/or commercial modelling tools and simulation software packages. To streamline the information flow within this heterogeneous variety of modelling tools, the concept of a modular, standardized simulation platform has recently been proposed. A first realisation of this concept is the AixViPMaP® - the Aachen Virtual Platform for Materials Processing.
- Process models calculate spatial distribution of structure features, e.g. fiber density and orientation in a composite material; small-scale models then calculate relationships between structure and properties, for use in a continuum models of overall part or system behavior
- Large scale models explicitly fully couple with small scale models, e.g. a fracture simulation might integrate a continuum solid mechanics model of macroscopic deformation with an FD model of atomic motions at the crack tip
- Suites of models (large-scale, small-scale, atomic-scale, process-structure, structure-properties, etc.) can be hierarchically integrated into a systems design framework to enable the computational design of entirely new materials. A commercial leader in the use of ICME in computational materials design is QuesTek Innovations LLC, a small business in Evanston, IL co-founded by Prof. Greg Olson of Northwestern University. QuesTek's high-performance Ferrium® steels were designed and developed using ICME methodologies.
- The Mississippi State University Internal State Variable (ISV) plasticity-damage model (DMG) developed by a team led by Prof. Mark F. Horstemeyer (Founder of Predictive Design Technologies) has been used to optimize the design of a Cadillac control arm, the Corvette engine cradle, and a powder metal steel engine bearing cap.
- ESI Group through its ProCast and SYSWeld are commercial finite element solutions used in production environments by major manufacturers in aerospace, automotive and government organizations to simulate local material phase changes of metals prior to manufacturing. PAMFORM is utilized for tracking material changes during composite forming manufacturing simulation.

== Education ==
Katsuyo Thorton announced at the 2010 MS&T ICME Technical Committee meeting that NSF would be funding a "Summer School" on ICME at the University of Michigan starting in 2011. Northwestern began offering a Masters of Science Certificate in ICME in the fall of 2011. The first Integrated Computational Materials Engineering (ICME) course based upon Horstemeyer 2012 was delivered at Mississippi State University (MSU) in 2012 as a graduate course with distance learning students included [cf., Sukhija et al., 2013]. It was later taught in 2013 and 2014 at MSU also with distance learning students. In 2015, the ICME Course was taught by Dr. Mark Horstemeyer (MSU) and Dr. William (Bill) Shelton (Louisiana State University, LSU) with students from each institution via distance learning. The goal of the methodology embraced in this course was to provide students with the basic skills to take advantage of the computational tools and experimental data provided by EVOCD in conducting simulations and bridging procedures for quantifying the structure-property relationships of materials at multiple length scales. On successful completion of the assigned projects, students published their multiscale modeling learning outcomes on the ICME Wiki, facilitating easy assessment of student achievements and embracing qualities set by the ABET engineering accreditation board.

== See also ==
- Computational materials science
- Materials informatics
- ICME cyberinfrastructure
- Cyberinfrastructure
- QuesTek Innovations
