= ICME cyberinfrastructure =

Integrated computational materials engineering (ICME) involves the integration of experimental results, design models, simulations, and other computational data related to a variety of materials used in multiscale engineering and design. Central to the achievement of ICME goals has been the creation of a cyberinfrastructure, a Web-based, collaborative platform which provides the ability to accumulate, organize and disseminate knowledge pertaining to materials science and engineering to facilitate this information being broadly utilized, enhanced, and expanded.

The ICME cyberinfrastructure provides storage, access, and computational capabilities for an extensive network of manufacturing, design, and life-cycle simulation software. Within this software framework, data is archived, searchable and interactive, offering engineers and scientists a vast database of materials-related information for use in research, multiscale modeling, simulation implementation, and an array of other activities in support of more efficient, less costly product development. Furthermore, the ICME cyberinfrastructure is expected to provide the capability to access and link application codes, including the development of protocols necessary to integrate hierarchical modeling approaches. With an emphasis on computational efficiency, experimental validation of models, and protecting intellectual property, the cyberinfrastructure assimilates 1) process-microstructure-property relations, 2) development of constitutive materials models that accurately predict multiscale material behaviors admitting microstructure/inclusions and history effects, 3) access to shared databases of analytical and experimental data, and 4) material models. As such, it is also crucial to identifying gaps in materials knowledge, which, in turn, guides the development of new materials theories, models, and simulation tools. Such a community-based knowledge foundation ultimately enables materials informatics systems that fuse high fidelity experimental databases with models of physical processes.

In addition, the vision of the ICME cyberinfrastructure is compatible with the National Science Foundation's (NSF) Cyberinfrastructure Vision for 21st Century Discovery, which advocates development and deployment of human-centered information technology (IT) systems that address the needs of science and engineering communities and open new opportunities for enhancing education and workforce development programs. According to the NSF directive, IT systems, such as the ICME cyberinfrastructure, should provide access to tools, services, and other networked resources, including high-performance computing facilities, data repositories, and libraries of computational tools, enabling and reliably supporting secure and efficient nationwide or global virtual organizations spanning across administrative boundaries.

== Implementation ==
The National Materials Advisory Board (NMAB) of the National Academy of Engineering (NAE) committee proposed the following definition for the term ICME cyberinfrastructure:

"The Internet-based collaborative materials science and engineering research and development environments that support advanced data acquisition, data and model storage, data and model management, data and model mining, data and model visualization, and other computing and information processing services required to develop an integrated computational materials engineering capability."

According to NMAB's vision, the building blocks of the ICME cyberinfrastructure are the individual web sites (Web Portals) which offer access to information, data, and tools, each established for specific purposes by different organizations. Linked together, these "constituent" Web Portals will form the ICME cyberinfrastructure, or ICME "Supply-Chain," i.e., a series of well-established, capable and viable organizations. These organizations are to provide necessary portions of the ICME cyberinfrastructure's value chain:

- Fundamental model development
- Model integration into software packages
- Maintenance of software tools
- Database generation
- Application engineering
- Customer approval and certification

For example, Mississippi State University has created an ICME cyberinfrastructure where different models, codes, and experimental structure-property data are available and discussed. Researchers are encouraged to upload their own models, codes, and experimental data with associated references for others to use.

== See also ==
- Cyberinfrastructure
- Materials informatics
- Integrated computational materials engineering
- Multiscale modeling
