= Andrei Borisovich Vistelius Research Award =

The Andrei Borisovich Vistelius Research Award is presented biennially by the International Association for Mathematical Geosciences (IAMG) to one male and one female early-career scientist for promising contributions in research in the fields of mathematical geosciences or geoinformatics. A recipient should be either (a) 35 years or younger at the end of the calendar year when selected for the award or (b) within seven years of the awarding of his or her highest degree. These time limits can be extended for up to two years to address circumstances which have interrupted the nominee’s career (i.e., serious illness, child birth, care giver, etc.). This award is named after Andrei Borisovich Vistelius, and was established in 1981.

== Recipients ==
Source: IAMG

- 1981 John M. Cubitt
- 1982 Stephen Henley and William E. Full
- 1983 Brian Jones
- 1984 Michel Rabinowicz
- 1985 Georges Verly
- 1986 Marek Kacewicz
- 1987 James R. Carr
- 1988 Andrew R. Solow
- 1989 Olivier Dubrule
- 1990 Guocheng Pan
- 1991 George Christakos
- 1992 Ute C. Herzfeld
- 1993 R. Mohan Srivastava
- 1994 Clayton V. Deutsch
- 1995 Qiuming Cheng
- 1997 Gerardus J. Weltje
- 1999 Pierre Goovaerts
- 2001 Jef Caers
- 2003 Karl Gerald van den Boogaart
- 2005 Sebastien Strebelle
- 2007 Raimon Tolosana-Delgado
- 2009 Guillaume Caumon
- 2011 Olena Babak
- 2013 Gregoire Mariethoz
- 2015 Xiaogang (Marshall) Ma
- 2017 Pejman Tahmasebi
- 2019 Alessandra Menafoglio; Wenlei Wang
- 2021 Vanessa Godoy; Francky Fouedjio
- 2023 Shaunna Morrison; Behnam Sadeghi
- 2025 Lijing Wang; Guoxiong Chen; Anirudh Prabhu

== See also ==
- List of geology awards
- List of geophysics awards
- List of mathematics awards
