= Raimon Tolosana-Delgado =

Spanish geostatistician (born 1976)

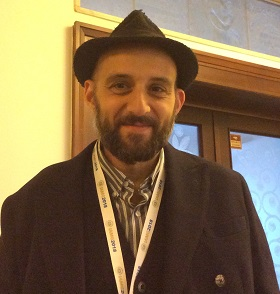
- Tolosana-Delgado in Prague in 2018
- Born: 19 August 1976 (age 50); Spain
- Education: Technical University of Catalonia; University of Barcelona; University of Girona
- Known for: Mathematical Petrology
- Awards: Felix Chayes Prize; Andrei Borisovich Vistelius Research Award
- Scientific career
- Fields: Geostatistics; Engineering Geology
- Workplaces: Helmholtz-Institut Freiberg für Ressourcentechnologie

Raimon Tolosana-Delgado is currently working at Helmholtz-Institut Freiberg für Ressourcentechnologie, Germany. Tolosana-Delgado received the Felix Chayes Prize in 2013, and the Andrei Borisovich Vistelius Research Award in 2007, from the International Association for Mathematical Geosciences. He is an elected Executive Vice President of the International Association for Mathematical Geosciences

== Education ==
- MS in Engineering Geology, in 2001, Technical University of Catalonia and University of Barcelona
- PhD in Environmental Sciences, in 2005 University of Girona

== Selected Book ==
Vera Pawlowsky-Glahn, Juan José Egozcue, Raimon Tolosana-Delgado, 2015. Modeling and Analysis of Compositional Data. Wiley, 256 p.

K. Gerald van den Boogaart, 2013. Analyzing Compositional Data with R. Springer-Verlag Berlin Heidelberg, 258 p.
