= Felix Chayes Prize =

- Description: Excellence in Research in Mathematical Petrology
- Country: International
- Presented by: International Association for Mathematical Geosciences (IAMG)
- Rewards: Cash prize and engraved plaque
- Website: iamg.org/awards-and-honours/felix-chayes-prize-for-excellence-in-research-in-mathematical-petrology/

The Felix Chayes Prize is presented in alternate years for Excellence in Research in Mathematical Petrology by the International Association for Mathematical Geosciences (IAMG). The cash prize, named after American geologist and petrographer Felix Chayes, was established in 1997. The prize has a strict internal guideline that the recipient must be between 35 and 60 years old.

== Recipients ==
- 1997: Committee on Data Bases for Petrology
- 1999: Hugh R. Rollinson
- 2001: James Nicholls
- 2003: Antonella Buccianti
- 2005: Eric Grunsky
- 2007: Hilmar von Eynatten
- 2009: not awarded for this year
- 2011: Istvan Dunkl
- 2013: Raimon Tolosana-Delgado
- 2015: Yongzhang Zhou
- 2017: Clifford R. Stanley
- 2019: Peter Filzmoser
- 2021: Grethe Hystad
- 2023: Pieter Vermeesch
- 2025: Dario Grana

== See also ==
- List of geology awards
- List of geophysics awards
- List of mathematics awards
