= NiFe hydrogenase =

Type of hydrogenase

not be confused with [NiFeSe] hydrogenase found in many Bacteria, a subclass of NiFe hydrogenase [NiFe] hydrogenase is a type of hydrogenase, which is an oxidative enzyme that reversibly converts molecular hydrogen in prokaryotes including Bacteria and Archaea. The catalytic site on the enzyme provides simple hydrogen-metabolizing microorganisms a redox mechanism by which to store and utilize energy via the reaction

$$\ce{H2 <=> 2H+ + 2e^-}$$

This is particularly essential for the anaerobic, sulfate-reducing bacteria of the genus Desulfovibrio as well as pathogenic organisms Escherichia coli and Helicobacter pylori. The mechanisms, maturation, and function of [NiFe] hydrogenases are actively being researched for applications to the hydrogen economy and as potential antibiotic targets.

== Structure ==
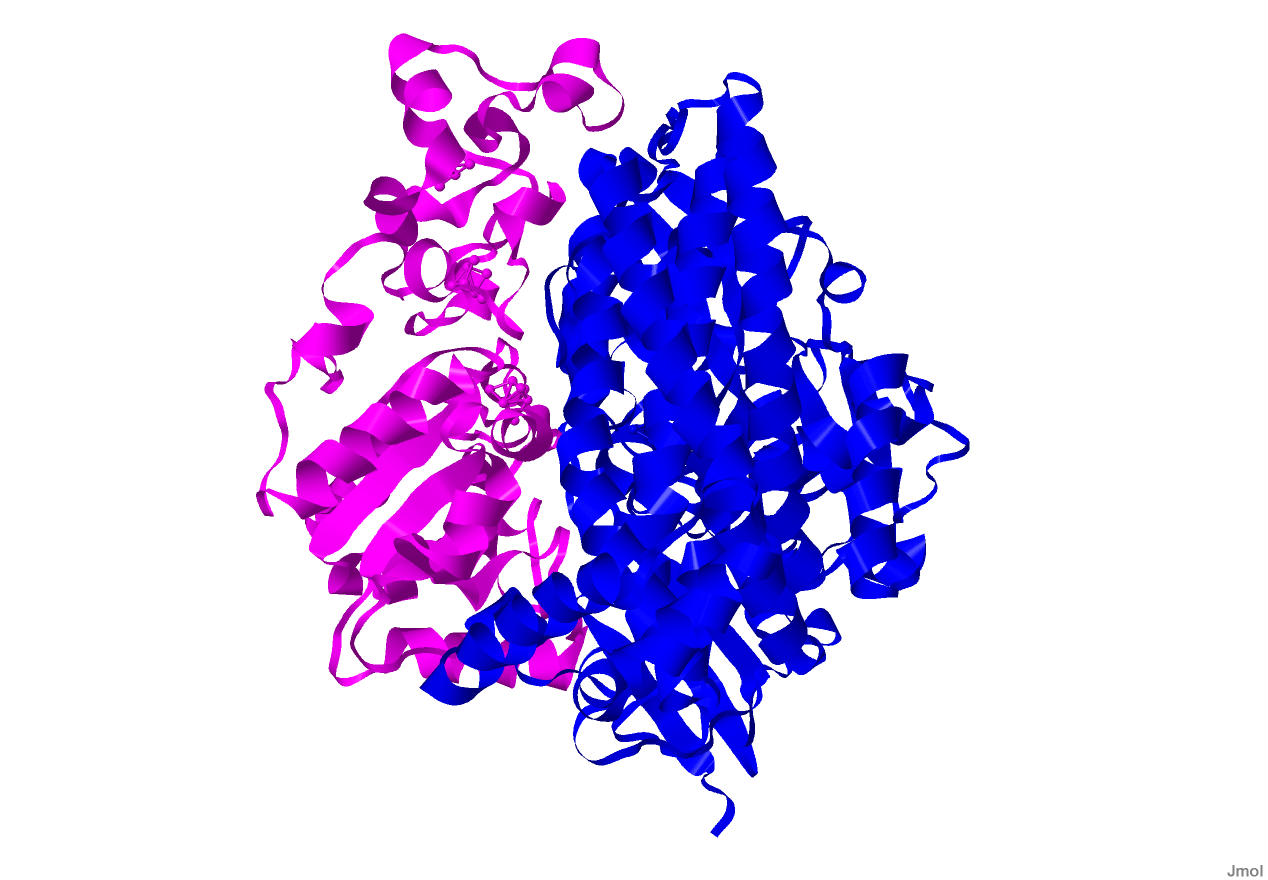
The structure of [NiFe] hydrogenase isolated from D. vulgaris Miyazaki F consists of two subunits: the large subunit (blue) and the small subunit (magenta). The Figure was prepared using Jmol and the coordinates from PDB: 1H2A.

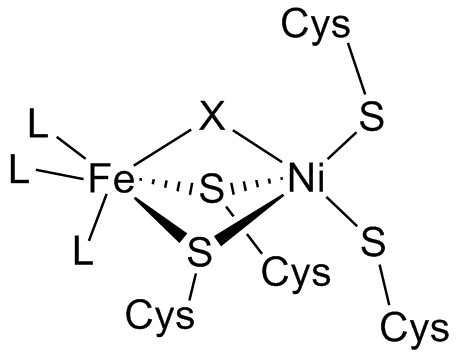
The active site of [NiFe] hydrogenase in the oxidized form. L refers to non-protein ligand (1 C≡O and 2 ^{−}C≡N). X can be an oxide, sulfur, hydroperoxide, or a hydroxide.

The structure of [NiFe] hydrogenase was obtained from X-ray crystallography studies of five different sulfate-reducing bacteria: Desulfovibrio vulgaris Miyazaki F, D. gigas, D. frutosovorans, D. desulfuricans, and Desulfomicrobium baculatum. The [NiFe] hydrogenase isolated from D. vulgaris Miyazaki F is shown on the right. The larger subunit is in blue, has a molecular mass of 62.5 kDa, and houses the Ni-Fe active site. The smaller subunit is in magenta, has a molecular mass of 28.8 kDa, and contains the Fe-S clusters.

From the infrared spectra and X-ray crystallography studies, the [NiFe] hydrogenase active site was found to be (S-Cys)_{4}Ni(μ-X)Fe(CO)(CN)_{2}, in which the generic ligand X is either an oxide, sulfur, hydroperoxide, or a hydroxide found in an oxidized state only. While the nickel atom participates in redox reactions, the iron atom is consistently in a Fe(II) oxidation state. The exact geometry of the three non-protein ligands (denoted as L) coordinating to the Fe ion is not known; however, they were identified as one carbon monoxide (C≡O) molecule and two cyanide (^{−}C≡N) molecules.

=== Fe-S clusters ===
Almost all hydrogenases contain at least one iron-sulfur cluster (Fe-S cluster). As previously mentioned, these Fe-S clusters connect the nickel active site of the enzyme to the surface of the protein because they serve as an electron transport chain from the Ni-Fe redox site to the electron acceptor cytochrome c_{3} (see cytochrome c family). These electrons are produced from the heterolytic cleavage of the hydrogen molecule at the Ni-Fe active site. Crystal structures of the hydrogenase show a Fe_{3}S_{4} in the center of the chain, and a Fe_{4}S_{4} cluster at the molecular surface. The distance between the internal Fe_{4}S_{4} cluster and the active site is approximately 12 Å.

The [NiFe] and [NiFeSe] hydrogenases have remarkably similar structures, leading to the suggestion that one sulfur on a Fe-S cluster was replaced by a selenium atom, but these hydrogenases differ in catalytic reactivity and sensitivity to enzyme inhibitors.

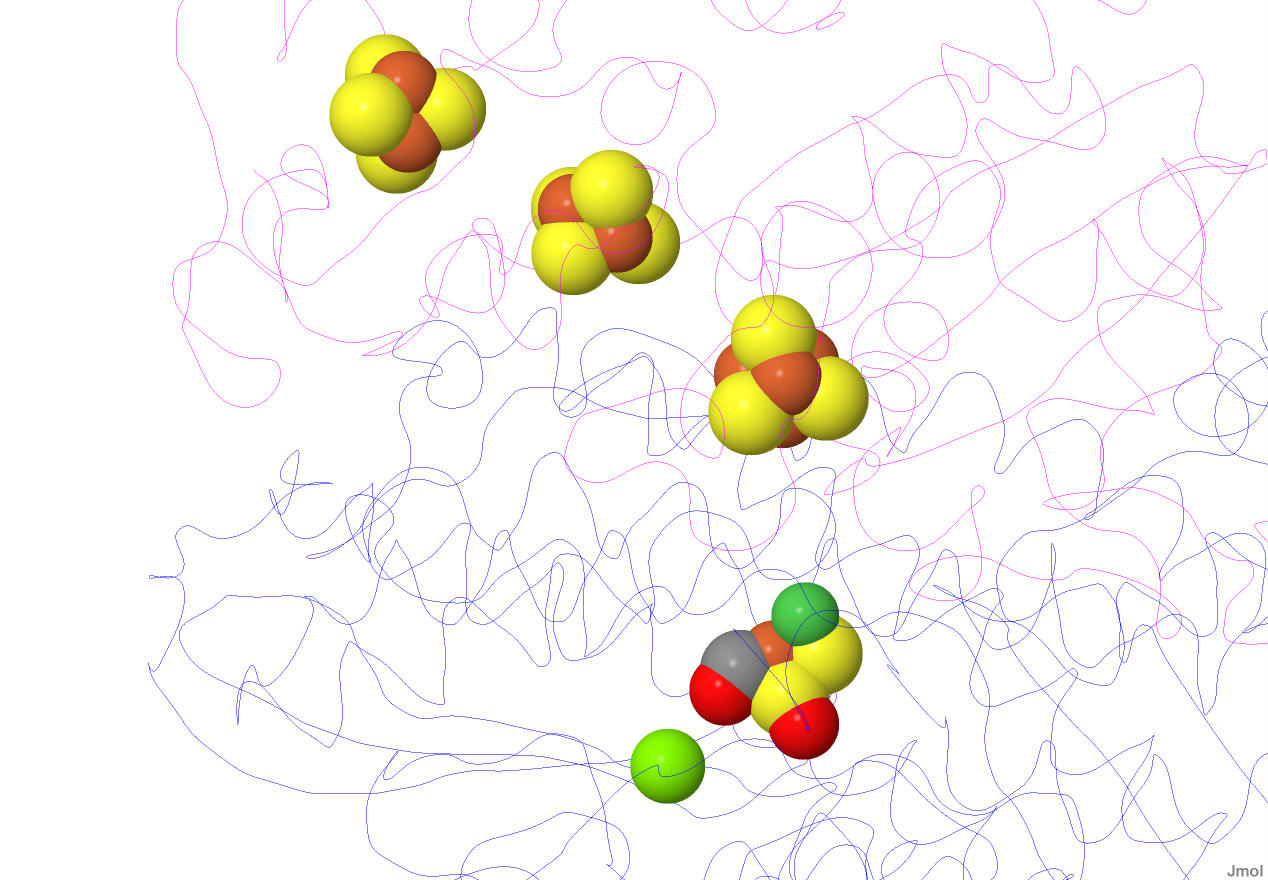
Illustration of [NiFe] hydrogenase enzyme with three Fe-S clusters in the small subunit and with Mg^{2+} and Ni-Fe dimetal active site in the large subunit. Figure was prepared using Jmol and the coordinates from PDB: 1H2A. Mg ion = neon green; Ni ion = dark green; Fe ion = orange; sulfur = yellow; oxygen = red; carbon = dark gray

=== Mg ion and the proton pathways ===
[NiFe] hydrogenase has a Mg^{2+} cation bound in the C-terminus region of the larger subunit. This cation is bonded to three water molecules and three amino acids, and it stabilizes this solvent-free region. At approximately 13 Å away from the [NiFe] moiety, this cation connects the active site to a hydrogen bonding network and serves as a proton (H^{+}) transfer pathway.

=== The gas-access channel ===
Studies, in which xenon was bound to the hydrogenase, suggest a hydrophobic gas channel through which H_{2}, CO, and O_{2} gases could reach the deeply buried active site within the enzyme. Crystal structure revealed several small channels at the surface, which combined into one larger channel that reached the [Ni-Fe] active site.

Since hydrogenases are well known to be oxygen sensitive, the diffusion of gas to the active site depends on the size and environment of the gas-access channel, the reaction of molecular oxygen (O_{2}) at the active site, and the recovery of the active site after oxidation.

== Mechanism ==
The exact reaction mechanism of [NiFe] hydrogenases has been a matter of great debate. In 2009, a mechanism was proposed by Higuchi and coworkers based on X-ray crystallography and spectroscopic data of Desulfovibrio vulgaris Miyazaki F. During the catalytic process, the Fe ion in the active site does not change its oxidation state while the Ni metal ion participates in redox chemistry. There are two main groups of redox states that [NiFe] hydrogenases pass through during catalysis:

1. Inactive redox states, and
2. Active redox states.

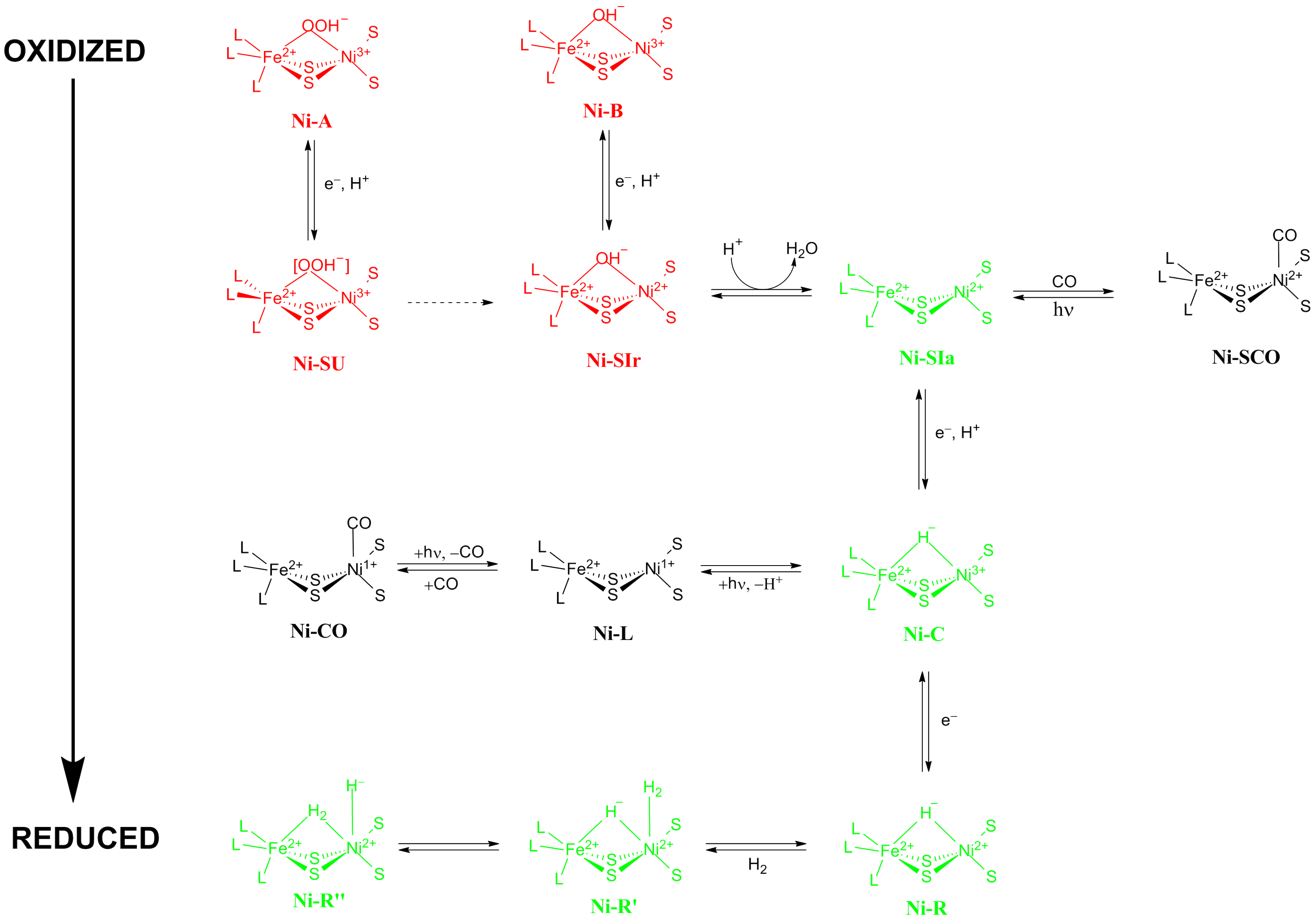
Figure 5. Different redox states of [NiFe] hydrogenase's metal active site. The redox states in the red are the inactive redox states. The redox states in the green are the active redox states. (Adapted from).

=== Inactive redox states ===
Ni-A (the “unready” state) and Ni-B (the “ready” state) are the most oxidized forms of the [NiFe] metal center and are activated via one-electron reduction with proton transfer. The rate of reductive activation of Ni-A to Ni-SU can take hours while the rate of reductive activation of Ni-B to Ni-SIr happens in seconds. The reason for this disparity in activation kinetics between Ni-A and Ni-B was proposed to be a result of the difference in bridging ligands between the two different redox states. At the Ni-SIr state, a water molecule was released to form the Ni-SIa state, the first catalytic redox active state of [NiFe] hydrogenases.

=== Active redox states ===
The three most important catalytic redox active states of [NiFe] hydrogenases are Ni-SIa, Ni-C and Ni-R (which have three different variations). The light-sensitive Ni-C state can be obtained via one electron reduction of Ni-SIa. The electron paramagnetic resonance spectroscopic studies of the Ni-C state, which contained a Ni^{3+} with S = 1/2 and a hydride bridging the two metals, Ni and Fe, showed that the heterolytic cleavage of H_{2} takes place in the [NiFe] hydrogenase active site.

==== The CO-inhibited states ====
Ni-SIa state can be inhibited by CO, which binds directly to Ni metal ion in a bent conformation to form Ni-SCO (see below). Since Ni-C is light sensitive, illumination at 100 K results in Ni-L redox state. During this process, nickel is reduced. In the presence of CO, Ni-L forms Ni-CO state.

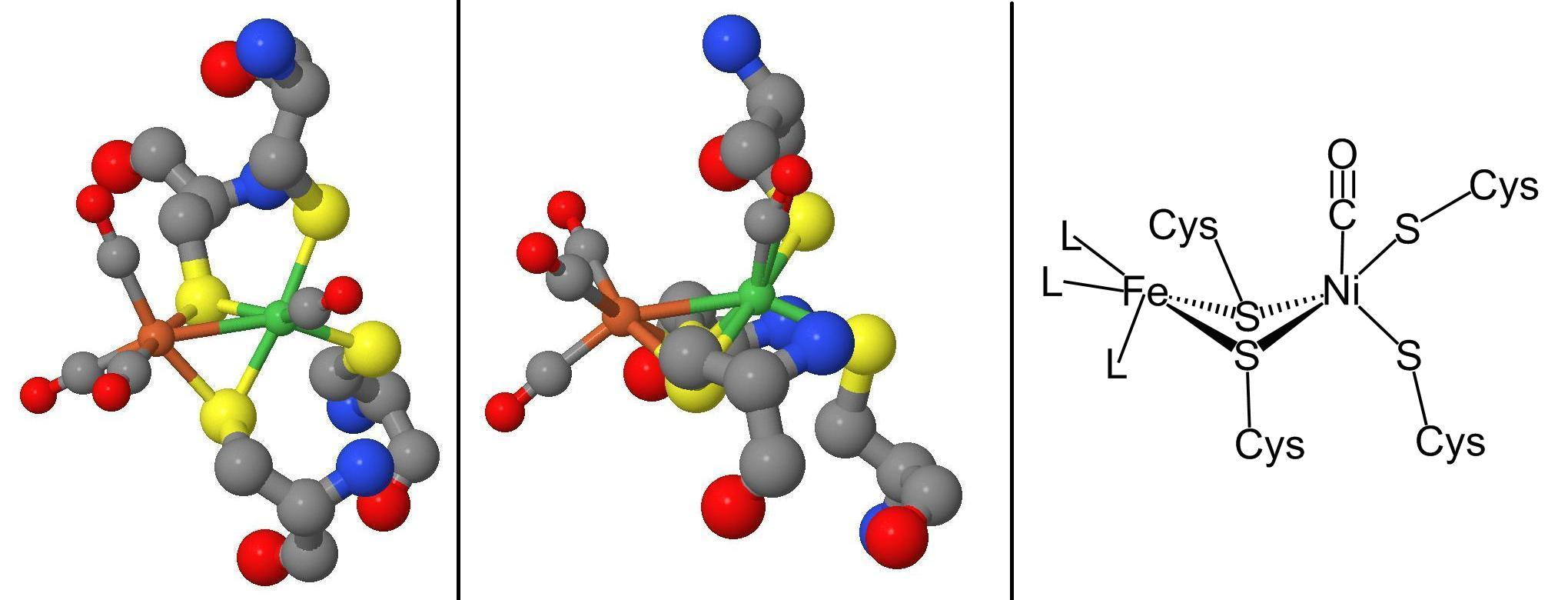
Figure 6. Illustration of the [NiFe] hydrogenase active site inhibited by CO. Top-down view (left). Side view (center). Chemdraw depiction of the inhibited active site (right). The figure was prepared with Jmol and coordinates from 1UBK.pdb. Ni ion = green; Fe ion = orange; sulfur = yellow; oxygen = red; carbon = dark gray; nitrogen = blue.

== Maturation and genetic arrangement ==
The maturation of [NiFe] hydrogenases requires a set of accessory proteins that synthesize the NiFe active site and modify the precursor enzyme so that it has the correct structure and location. The maturation of the active site is of special interest because of the synthesis of cyanide (CN) and carbon monoxide (CO) metal ligands which are usually toxic to living organism. This step is completed by the proteins HypC, HypD, HypE, and HypF. After, synthesis of the iron center, nickel is inserted using metallochaperones HypA, HypB, and SlyD. Once the catalytic center is completed, the hydrogenase precursor undergoes a C-terminal cleavage that prompts rearrangement of its structure and association with the small subunit. Finally, the completed enzyme is transported to its correct position within the cell. Hydrogenase promoter, P_{SH}, can be studied constructing a P_{SH} promoter-gfp fusion by using green fluorescent protein (gfp) reporter gene.

== Application ==
Since [NiFe] hydrogenase is a member of the hydrogenase family, these enzymes can catalyze both the consumption and production of hydrogen. By studying [NiFe] hydrogenase, scientists can optimize a condition in which the protein will only produce hydrogen. Additionally, small enzyme mimic of [NiFe] hydrogenase can also be synthesized to act as hydrogen gas generator. The soluble [NiFe] hydrogenase from Ralstonia eutropha H16 is a promising candidate enzyme for H_{2}-based biofuel application as it favours H_{2} oxidation and is relatively oxygen-tolerant. It can be produced on heterotrophic growth media and purified via anion exchange and size exclusion chromatography matrices.

== See also ==
- Hydrogenase
- Fe-Ni Clusters
- Bioinorganic
