= Spatial Statistics =

- Discipline: Statistics
- Language: English
- Edited by: Alfred Stein

Publication details
- History: 2012-present
- Publisher: Elsevier
- Impact factor: 2.3 (2022)

Standard abbreviations
- ISO 4: Spat. Stat.

Indexing
- ISSN: 2211-6753
- OCLC no.: 795554601

Links
- Journal homepage

Spatial Statistics is an academic journal published by Elsevier about methodological developments and applications of spatial statistics and spatiotemporal statistics. It concerns the advancements in the quantitative analysis of all types of spatial and spatiotemporal data. The journal was announced at the Spatial Statistics for Mapping the Environment conference in 2011 held in Enschede, the Netherlands. The first issue was published in 2012.

The journal has become the flagship journal of the Spatial Statistics Society. Its current editor-in-chief is Alfred Stein. In 2022, the journal's impact factor was 2.3.
