= QuesTek Innovations =

Materials engineering company

QuesTek Innovations LLC
- Type: Private
- Industry: Materials science; Software
- Founded: 1997 in Evanston, Illinois
- Founder: Greg Olson, Charlie Kuehmann, Ray Genellie, Charlie West
- Products: ICMD®
- Website: questek.com

QuesTek Innovations LLC is a materials science, engineering and software company that develops materials for applications such as automotive and aerospace. It is one of the first companies to employ integrated computational material engineering (ICME), which relies on physics-based models to predict the performance characteristics of materials. QuesTek has developed materials for companies such as Tesla, SpaceX, Apple, General Motors, Audi. and government agencies such as NASA, United States Department of Energy, and United States Department of Defense. QuesTek uses simulation tools to predict formulations of alloys that can meet the requirements for material properties and performance, often while increasing sustainability. In 2023, QuesTek launched its Integrated Computational Materials Design (ICMD^{®}) software platform.

== History ==
QuesTek was founded in 1997 in Evanston, Illinois, by Greg Olson, Charlie Kuehmann, Ray Genellie and Charlie West.

QuesTek designs metal alloys for applications such as airplane parts, race-car gears, medical devices and sporting goods. It uses computer-modeling methods to complete work for clients such the U.S. Defense Department, Boeing and other original equipment manufacturers. QuesTek claims to be able to make new metal alloys in half the time and at less than 30% of the cost of traditional methods. QuesTek's software predicts how certain elements will react to one another and gets an early read on characteristics such as strength, flexibility and weight.

Kuehmann is the vice president of materials engineering at SpaceX and Tesla and formerly worked on a design team at Apple. At Tesla he has overcome materials challenges related to stainless steel.

Olson is currently the chief science officer of QuesTek, a member of the company’s board and a professor at Massachusetts Institute of Technology. He is a former professor at Northwestern University. At MIT, Olson investigates fracture resistance, creates materials system designs through computational modeling, and develops design methodologies for alloy steels and other materials, including intermetallic composites, ceramics, and polymers.

The company was named a Most Innovative Company in the space industry by Fast Company in 2025.

== ICMD^{®} ==
In 2023, QuesTek launched its Integrated Computational Materials Design (ICMD^{®}) software, which is built on computational physics models developed through QuesTek's Materials by Design® approach in order to resolve challenges from hundreds of materials science engagements QuesTek has completed on behalf of private companies and government agencies since 1997. Drawing on QuesTek’s proprietary models as well as the Materials Genome Initiative, ICMD^{®} maps materials science outcomes into predictive models. ICMD^{®} also uses AI and machine learning when beneficial to solving a particular materials challenge. The ICMD^{®} SaaS application developed by QuesTek allows users to bring ICME capabilities in-house, in order to develop, design and deploy novel materials. Since its initial launch, QuesTek continues to expand the ICMD^{®} platform with additional capabilities, such as simulations specifically for additive manufacturing.

== Patents and projects ==
QuesTek holds 25 patents and currently has 11 patents pending.

The company has been publicly tapped for many high-profile projects including an April 2026 announcement from NASA that the agency had engaged QuesTek via its SBIR program to develop materials modeling software that will enable additive manufacturing in space.

QuesTek developed heat-resistant rocket alloys for the SpaceX reusable launch system development program. Its materials were used on the Starship’s Super Heavy booster that landed back on the launchpad in October, 2024.

The U.S. Air Force uses QuesTek’s Ferrium® S53® steel on landing gear pistons of the T-38 aircraft. This steel provides resistance to stress corrosion cracking, fatigue, corrosion fatigue, and grinding burn damage. It also eliminates the need for toxic cadmium plating.

QuesTek also worked with the U.S. Navy to find a new alloy for the hook shank on Navy aircraft. QuesTek developed Ferrium® M54® steel, which is lower cost, stronger and corrosion resistant, doubling the number of landings before replacement is needed to 2,000. Ferrium® M54® also uses far less cobalt compared to other ultra-high strength steels, which is sourced from countries in Africa which can be unstable. The National Institute of Standards and Technology (NIST) also supported the development of Ferrium® M54® as one of several Quantitative Benchmark for Time to Market Framework case studies to support the Materials Genome Initiative.
