= Cyberinfrastructure =

Type of infrastructure

United States federal government agencies use the term cyberinfrastructure to describe research environments that support advanced data acquisition, data storage, data management, data integration, data mining, data visualization and other computing and information processing services distributed over the Internet beyond the scope of a single institution. In scientific usage, cyberinfrastructure is a technological and sociological solution to the problem of efficiently connecting federal laboratories, large scales of data, processing power, and scientists with the goal of enabling novel scientific discoveries and advancements in human knowledge.

== Origin ==
The term National Information Infrastructure had been popularized by Al Gore in the 1990s. This use of the term "cyberinfrastructure" evolved from the same thinking that produced Presidential Decision Directive NSC-63 on Protecting America's Critical Infrastructures (PDD-63). PDD-63 focuses on the security and vulnerability of the nation's "cyber-based information systems" as well as the critical infrastructures on which America's military strength and economic well-being depend, such as the electric power grid, transportation networks, potable water and wastewater infrastructures.

The term "cyberinfrastructure" was used in a press briefing on PDD-63 on May 22, 1998 with Richard A. Clarke, then national coordinator for security, infrastructure protection, and counter-terrorism, and Jeffrey Hunker, who had just been named director of the critical infrastructure assurance office. Hunker stated:

"One of the key conclusions of the President's commission that laid the intellectual framework for the President's announcement today was that while we certainly have a history of some real attacks, some very serious, to our cyber-infrastructure, the real threat lay in the future. And we can't say whether that's tomorrow or years hence. But we've been very successful as a country and as an economy in wiring together our critical infrastructures. This is a development that's taken place really over the last 10 or 15 years—the Internet, most obviously, but electric power, transportation systems, our banking and financial systems."

The term "cyberinfrastructure" was used by a US National Science Foundation (NSF) blue-ribbon committee in 2003 in response to the question: how can NSF, as the nation's premier agency funding basic research, remove existing barriers to the rapid evolution of high performance computing, making it truly usable by all the nation's scientists, engineers, scholars, and citizens? The NSF use of the term focuses on the integrated assemblage of these information technologies with one another.

A workshop on cyberinfrastructure for the social sciences was held in San Diego, California in May 2005. Another conference was held in January 2007 in Washington, D.C. A "CyberInfrastructure Partnership" existed from February 2005 until 2009. A collaboration led by the University of Wisconsin–Madison and Boston University had a web site called "Engaging People in Cyberinfrastructure" (EPIC) which existed from 2005 through 2007. Two NSF sponsored workshops on Financial Cyberinfrastructure were organized in 2010 and 2012 by Louiqa Raschid and Albert "Pete" Kyle University of Maryland, H.V. Jagadish University of Michigan and Mark Flood Office of Financial Research, Department of the Treasury.

Complementing the technical construction of cyberinfrastructure, social scientists in the field of computer supported cooperative work investigate the organizational and social aspects of building these large-scale, distributed resources to support science. Related to this research space is the notion of the collaboratory, originally coined by William Wulf.

Cyberinfrastructure is more often called e-Science or e-Research. In particular, the United Kingdom started an e-Science initiative in 2001.; the Systems Geology initiative of the British Geological Survey is an example. Others distinguish e-Science as the work that is done using the cyberinfrastructure.

There are many inter-governmental advisory groups related to Cyberinfrastructure aspects like E-Infrastructures Reflection Group and European Strategy Forum on Research Infrastructures dealing with policies on electronic infrastructures for research, i.e. research networks, computing, software and data infrastructures that mainly serve students, researchers and scientists. They advise and recommend actions towards the European Commission (DG CONNECT), the EU Member states governments (Research or Science Ministries), e-Infrastructure providers and users.

== Examples ==
NSF's Office of Cyberinfrastructure, for example, supported the TeraGrid project in which the Grid Infrastructure Group led by University of Chicago provided integration of resources and services that were operated by some of the US's supercomputing centers. This project has now evolved to the Extreme Science and Engineering Discovery Environment (XSEDE) project, led by the National Center for Supercomputing Applications.

The nanoHUB and its HUBzero software originally funded in 2002 is an important cyberinfrastructure that is seeing continued usage. Cyberinfrastructure is often specialized toward domains in science and engineering. For example, NSF funded a large cyberinfrastructure for earthquake engineering called NEEShub at Purdue University from 2009–15. NSF funded the iPlant Collaborative in 2008 to support plant sciences, including data-intensive plant genomics and phylogenetics. Mississippi State University created an Integrated Computational Materials Engineering (ICME) cyberinfrastructure in 2010 that focuses on multiscale modeling.

The United States Department of Energy supports e-Science through high performance computing and other initiatives involving its laboratories, including:

- Argonne National Laboratory
- Lawrence Berkeley National Laboratory
- Stanford Linear Accelerator Center
- Oak Ridge National Laboratory
- Fermi National Accelerator Laboratory

The Department of Energy (Office of Science SciDAC-2 program from the High Energy Physics, Nuclear Physics and Advanced Software and Computing Research programs) and NSF (Math and Physical Sciences, Office of Cyberinfrastructure and Office of International Science and Engineering Directorates) support the Open Science Grid which is a consortium of more than 80 member institutions and alliances.

Other examples include:

- Open Science Grid Consortium
- Datanet
- XSEDE
- National Center for Supercomputing Applications
- National LambdaRail and Internet2
- ICME cyberinfrastructure

== See also ==
- Data infrastructure
- Grid computing
- Collaboratory
- Systems Geology
