= Iognáid G. Ó Muircheartaigh =

Irish academic, President of NUI Galway 2000-2008

Iognáid Gearóid Ó Muircheartaigh is an Irish academic who served as president of NUI Galway between 2000 and 2008. The Ó Muircheartaigh Hall in the university's sports centre is named in his honour.

== Early life and education ==
From County Kerry, he attended an Irish-speaking school, Colaiste Mhuire, on Dublin's Parnell Square. He then attended University College Dublin. He earned a PhD in statistics at the University of Glasgow under the supervision of John Aitchison. He was awarded a Fulbright Fellowship at Stanford University, and a US National Academy of Sciences Senior Research Associateship at the US Naval Postgraduate School in Monterey, California.

== Academic career ==
During his term as president, NUI Galway conferred honorary doctorates on Nelson Mandela, Louise Arbour, Sr. Helen Prejean, Richard Goldstone, Philippe Kirsch, Pius Langa and Cyril Ramaphosa.

As an adjunct professor in Human Rights, he continues to undertake research in Statistics, with applications in Human Rights, Economics, and Medicine.

== Other roles ==
Ó Muircheartaigh has also served on the board of directors of Aer Arann. He is also on the board of directors of the Galway Rape Crisis Centre.

== Recognition ==
He was conferred with honorary doctorates by both the University of Connecticut and the University of Massachusetts.

Academic offices
| Preceded by Patrick F. Fottrell | President of University College Galway; 2000–2008 | Succeeded by James J. Browne |
