= Martin Newell =

Martin Newell may refer to:

- Martin Newell (computer scientist), British computer scientist, creator of the Utah teapot
- Martin Newell (musician) (born 1953), British singer-songwriter, poet and author
- Martin Newell (priest) (born 1967), English priest
- Martin L. Newell (born 1939), Irish mathematician and Gaelic footballer
- Martin J. Newell (1910–1985), Irish mathematician and educationalist, who served as President of University College Galway from 1960 to 1975
