= Bayes space =

Statistical field

Bayes space is a function space defined as an equivalence class of measures with the same null-sets. Two measures are defined to be equivalent if they are proportional. The basic ideas of Bayes spaces have their roots in Compositional Data Analysis and the Aitchison geometry. Theoretical applications are mainly in statistics, specifically functional data analysis of density functions, aka density data analysis. Practical applications are in geochemistry, COVID-19 modelling, sediment analysis and developmental research. Alternative approaches to density analysis are based on the Wasserstein metric, often termed Wasserstein regression, have also been applied to medicine.

The basic structure of the Bayes space is that of a vector space, with addition and multiplication being defined by perturbation and powering. The space is formed over a $\sigma$-finite reference/base measure, denoted $\lambda$ or $P$ depending on whether it is infinite or finite. Densities are considered as Radon-Nikodym derivatives of the measures with same null-sets as the base measure, and are equivalent if they are proportional. In case of finite base measures, Hilbert space structure can be achieved by defining a centered log-ratio transformation on the measures, mapping them to a subset of $L^2(P)$ consisting of functions integrating to 0.

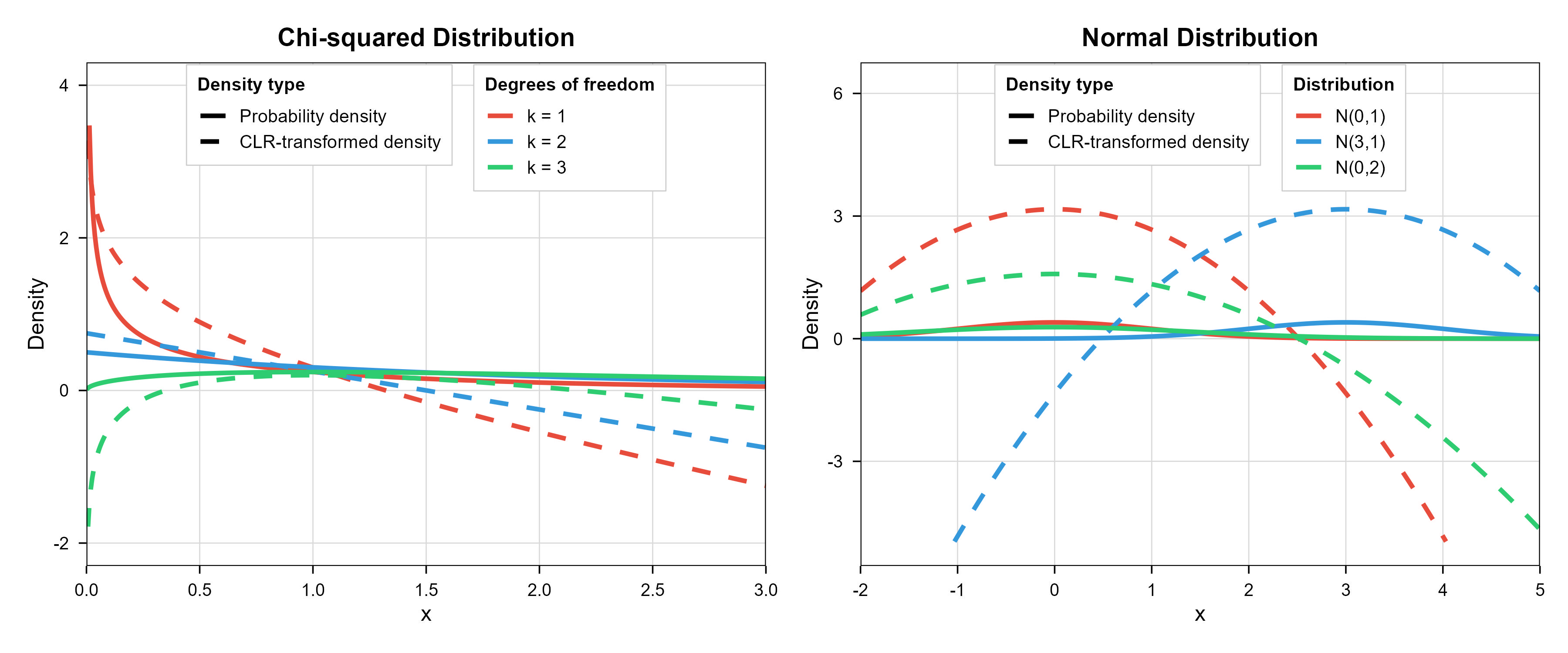
Visualisation of clr-transfomrations of densities from Chi-squared distribution and Normal distribution, with truncations to $(0,3)$ and $(-2,5)$ respectively.

For data analysis, density functions are typically estimated using so-called ZB-splines to smooth over a histogram of the data, using Kernel density estimation, or using a combination of the two.

== Definitions and main results ==
Consider a finite base measure $P$ (not necessarily a probability measure) on a domain $\Omega$. This may be a uniform distribution on a bounded interval, or it can be a Radon-Nikodym derivative of the Lebesgue measure (the Gaussian distribution, for example). In practice, $\Omega$ is often truncated to a bounded interval. If we take two densities $f,g$ with respect to $P$, they are said to be B-equivalent if there exists a $c>0$ s.t $f(x)= c \cdot g(x)$, denoted $f=_B g$ (the convention $c \cdot \infty = \infty$ is used in cases where a measure is infinite). It can be shown that $(=_B)$ is an equivalence relation. The Bayes space $B(P)$ is defined as the quotient space of all measures with the same null-sets in $\Omega$ as $P$ under the equivalence relation $(=_B)$.

The first challenge to analysing density functions is that $B(P)$ is not linear space under ordinary addition and multiplication since the ordinary difference between two densities would not be non-negative everywhere. Like in the Aitchison geometry for finite dimensional data, perturbation and powering is defined for densities:

Perturbation

$(f\oplus g) (x)=_Bf(x)\cdot g(x)$

Powering

$\alpha \odot f(x)=_B f(x)^\alpha$

where $f(x),\text{ }g(x)$ are densities in $B(P)$ and $\alpha$ is some real number. It can be shown using the properties of multiplication and powering of real numbers that $(B(P),\oplus,\odot)$ forms a vector space over the real numbers.

The definition of Bayes space does not strictly require a finite reference measure $P$. If Bayes space is defined over an infinite reference measure $\lambda$, it must be $\sigma$-finite (like the Lebesgue measure). The finite reference measure is, however, necessary for adding Hilbert space structure to a subset of $B(P)$. Consider the subspace

$B^p(P)=\{f\in B(P)|\int_\Omega |\log(f(x))|^p dP(x)<\infty\}$. For $p=2$, this is a linear subspace and isometrically isomorphic to the Hilbert space $L_0^2(P)=\{g\in L^2(P):\int_\Omega g(x) dP(x)=0\}$ via the centered log-ratio (clr) transformation $\text{clr}(f(x))=\log(f(x))-\frac{1}{P(\Omega)}\int \log(f(x)) dP(x)\in L_0^2(P)$. The subspace of log-square integrable functions is termed the Bayes Hilbert space. It can be shown that the clr transformation is a linear isomorphism between the two spaces. Defining an inner product on $B^2(P)$ as the inner product of the clr transformations will provide the Hilbert space structure for $B^2(P)$, obtaining the centered log-ratio transformation as a linear isometry. Specifically, this results in the Aitchison distance between two densities in the same Bayes Hilbert space

$d(f,g)=\int (\text{clr}(f(x))-\text{clr}(g(x)))^2dP(x)$

which for densities with respect to the Lebesgue measure on an interval $\Omega=[a,b]$ "simplifies" to $d(f,g)=\int_a^b \left(\left[\text{log}(f(x))-\frac{1}{b-a}\int_a^b \text{log}(f(x)) dx\right]-\left[\text{log}(g(x))-\frac{1}{b-a}\int_a^b \text{log}(g(x)) dx\right]\right)^2dx$.

== Multivariate densities ==
The measure $P$ does not have to be univariate (one-dimensional), but can also be defined as a product measure on Cartesian products, characterising bivariate (two-dimensional) or multivariate densities. The geometric structure of Hilbert spaces can be used to decompose multivariate densities orthogonally into independent and interaction parts using the concept of "geometric marginals". This decomposition has relations to copula theory. The geometry in $B^2(P)$ defines norms on densities that can be used to quantify "relative simplicial deviance", which is measure of how much of a bivariate distribution can be explained by the interaction part; in the multivariate case the relative simplicial deviance can be generalised to the "information composition".

== See also ==
- Compositional data analysis
- Functional data analysis
- Copulas
- Information geometry
