= University of Galway =

Public university in Galway, Ireland

- Ollscoil na Gaillimhe
- Former names: Queen's College, Galway; University College, Galway; National University of Ireland, Galway
- Motto: Deo Favente
- Motto in English: With the favour of God
- Type: Public
- Established: 30 December 1845; 180 years ago
- Affiliations: AUA; Coimbra Group; EUA; NUI; IUA; UI; ENLIGHT
- Budget: €360 million (2022)
- President: David J. Burn
- Chair of Údarás na hOllscoile: Máire Geoghegan-Quinn
- Academic staff: 1,587
- Total staff: 2,650
- Students: 19,335 (2023/24)
- Undergraduates: 14,405 (2023/24)
- Postgraduates: 4,930 (2023/24)
- Location: University Road, Galway, H91 TK33, Ireland; 53.279°N 9.060°W
- Campus: 105 hectares (260 acres); Urban
- Language: English; Irish
Colours
Scarf colours: two halves of black and white, the white half divided in two by a narrow red stripe
- Website: universityofgalway.ie ollscoilnagaillimhe.ie

The University of Galway (Irish: Ollscoil na Gaillimhe) is a public research university located in the city of Galway, Ireland. It was founded in 1845 as Queen's College, Galway. It was known as "University College, Galway" from 1908 to 1997 and as "National University of Ireland, Galway" (NUI Galway) from 1997 to 2022. In September 2022, the university changed its name to "University of Galway". It is also a member of the Coimbra Group, a network of 42 long-established European universities.

== History ==
The university was established in 1845 as Queen's College, Galway, together with Queen's College, Cork, and Queen's College, Belfast. It opened for teaching on 30 October 1849 with 68 students. In 1850, it became part of the Queen's University of Ireland, and its degrees were conferred in the name of that university.

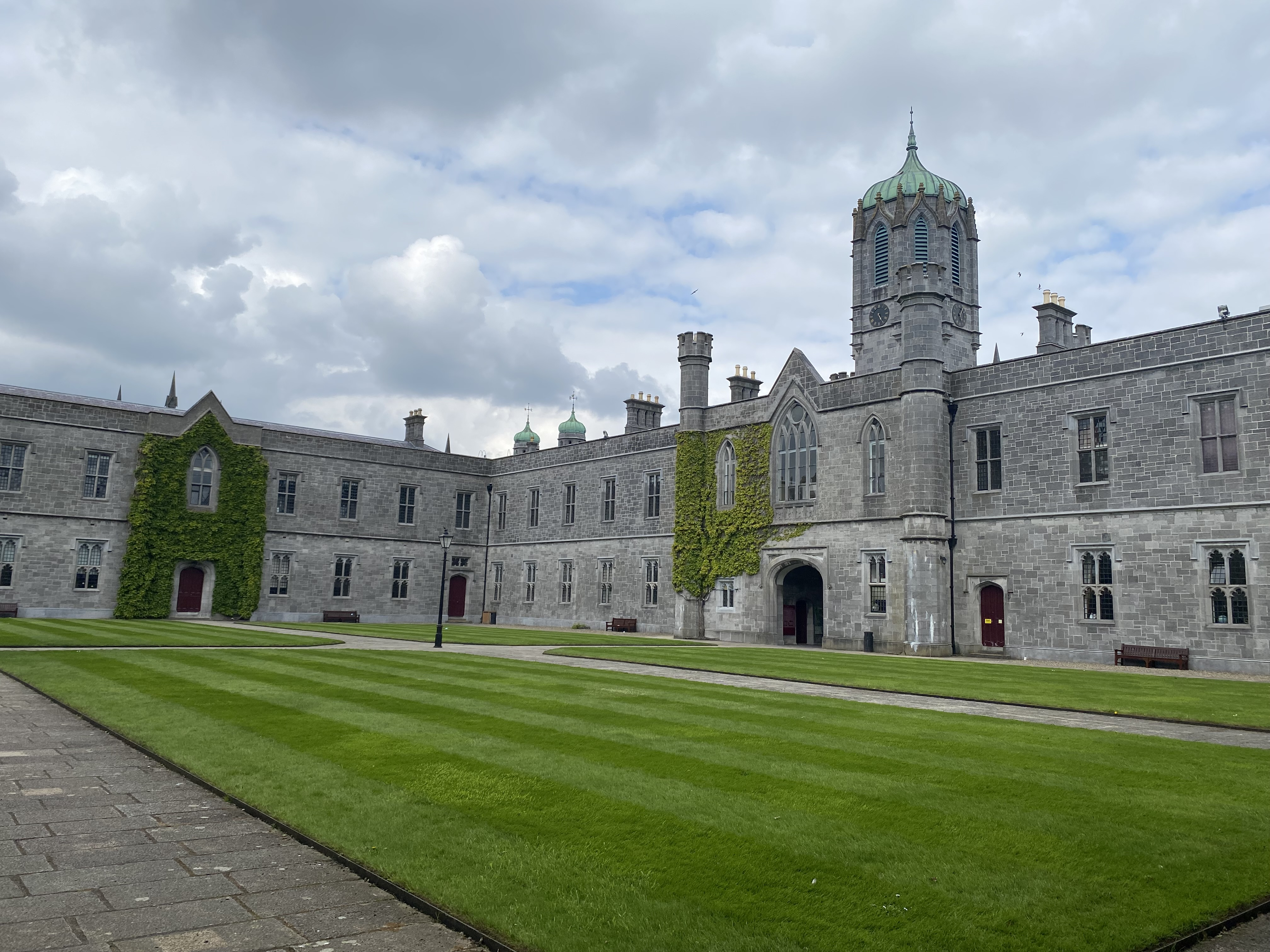
The Quadrangle Building

Located close to the city centre, the university campus stretches along the River Corrib. The oldest part of the university, the Quadrangle with its Aula Maxima, was designed by John Benjamin Keane in a Tudor Gothic architectural style and was constructed from local limestone; it is a replica of Christ Church, one of the colleges at the University of Oxford.

The Queen's University was dissolved on 3 February 1882 under the University Education (Ireland) Act 1879, and was replaced by the Royal University of Ireland (RUI), which had been established on 27 April 1880.

Under the Irish Universities Act 1908, the RUI was dissolved and was replaced by the National University of Ireland (NUI) and Queen's University of Belfast (QUB). The name of Queen's College, Galway, was changed to University College, Galway (UCG), and it became a constituent college of the new National University of Ireland, together with University College Dublin (UCD), and University College Cork (UCC). Queen's College, Belfast, became an independent university, called the Queen's University of Belfast. University College, Galway (UCG), was given special statutory responsibility under the University College Galway Act 1929 with respect of the use of the Irish language as a working language of the university.

Members of the Franciscan Order from St. Anthony's College would have studied for degrees in UCG, similarly members of the Society of African Missions at their House of Philosophy, at Cloughballymore, Kilcolgan, Co Galway, studied for degrees in UCG. St. Anthony's is now used by the J.E. Cairnes School of Business & Economics.

Several new buildings were constructed on the university campus in the 1970s and were designed by architects Scott Tallon Walker. The 1990s also saw considerable development, including the conversion of an old munitions factory into a student centre. Under the early 21st-century Presidency of Iognáid G. Ó Muircheartaigh, the university announced details of plans to make the university a "campus of the future" at a cost of around €400 million. Ó Muircheartaigh's successor James J. Browne continued and implemented that plan.

Under the Universities Act 1997, the name of University College, Galway, was changed to National University of Ireland, Galway (NUI Galway), and it became a university in its own right, as a constituent university of the National University of Ireland (NUI). The university had hoped to change its name to University of Galway, but had received legal advice that this was not possible under the provisions of the Act.

Visiting the university in 2003, on what was to be his last visit to Ireland, Nelson Mandela condemned U.S. foreign policy and received an honorary doctorate from the NUI Chancellor, Garret FitzGerald.

21st-century developments include a state-of-the-art University Sports Centre (Ionad Spóirt), Áras Moyola, J.E. Cairnes School of Business & Economics, the Alice Perry Engineering Building, the BioSciences Research Building, the Life Course Institute, the Lambe Institute and the O'Donoghue Centre for Drama, Theatre and Performance, and the Human Biology Building.

In 2014, the Equality Tribunal ruled in favor of Dr Micheline Sheehy Skeffington, granddaughter of the famous Irish feminist couple Hannah Sheehy Skeffington and Francis Sheehy Skeffington, who claimed she had been discriminated against on the grounds of gender during 2009. The university "unreservedly" accepted the decision that the "hiring process was flawed". In 2015 with "widespread concern" among staff, mandatory unconscious bias training was introduced for senior staff, including heads of school and interview boards. In 2017 Dr Elizabeth Tilley was deemed to have exceeded qualifications for senior lectureship following a Labour Court hearing and promoted. In 2017, the gender ratio of senior lecturers in the university was 60:40 in favour of men. The ratio of professorships, the most senior academic grade, was 87:13 in favor of men. In 2018 the university achieved bronze status in the Athena SWAN recognises a commitment to advancing gender equality in higher education and research careers. In 2018 a further four female lecturers who had also applied for promotion in 2009 were promoted having settled their cases "amicably".

The university launched its Strategic Plan "Shared Vision, Shaped By Values" (for the period 2020–2025) in 2020. Also in 2020, the university was awarded €4 million from the EU's Horizon 2020 Research and Innovation programme to support its Solar2chem project.

In April 2022, it was announced that NUI Galway would be renamed "Ollscoil na Gaillimhe – University of Galway" in summer 2022, amid confusion over its proper title. On 1 September 2022, the university changed its name to the "University of Galway". This change took legal effect in February 2024.

== Bilingual status ==
Under the University College Galway Act, 1929 (which came into effect on 17 December 1929), the university was given special statutory responsibility with respect of the use of the Irish language as a working language of the university.

The Act of 1929 provided that when recruiting a person to work for the university, a person competent in the Irish language must be appointed to the position unless no such person with the necessary competence to carry out the role could be found among the candidates for the position. As a result, every president appointed to the university thereafter was fluent in Irish. The university's governing authority complained that this requirement limited the pool of potential candidates for the office of president (in particular, candidates from overseas). As a result, the Act was amended in 2006 to replace the requirement for fluency in the Irish language amongst staff and management with a commitment to provide for education through the Irish language. In 2016, the university amended its recruitment criteria to allow for the possibility of a non-Irish-speaking president.

In August 2025, a non-Irish-speaking president was appointed to the university for the first time since the appointment of Alexander Anderson in 1899.

== Colleges and schools ==
Up until 2007, the university was divided into seven faculties (Arts, Celtic Studies, Commerce, Law, Medicine and Health Sciences, and Science), which were further subdivided into some 69 departments. In 2007–2008, the university transitioned from the faculties and departments structure to a structure of five colleges divided into various schools.

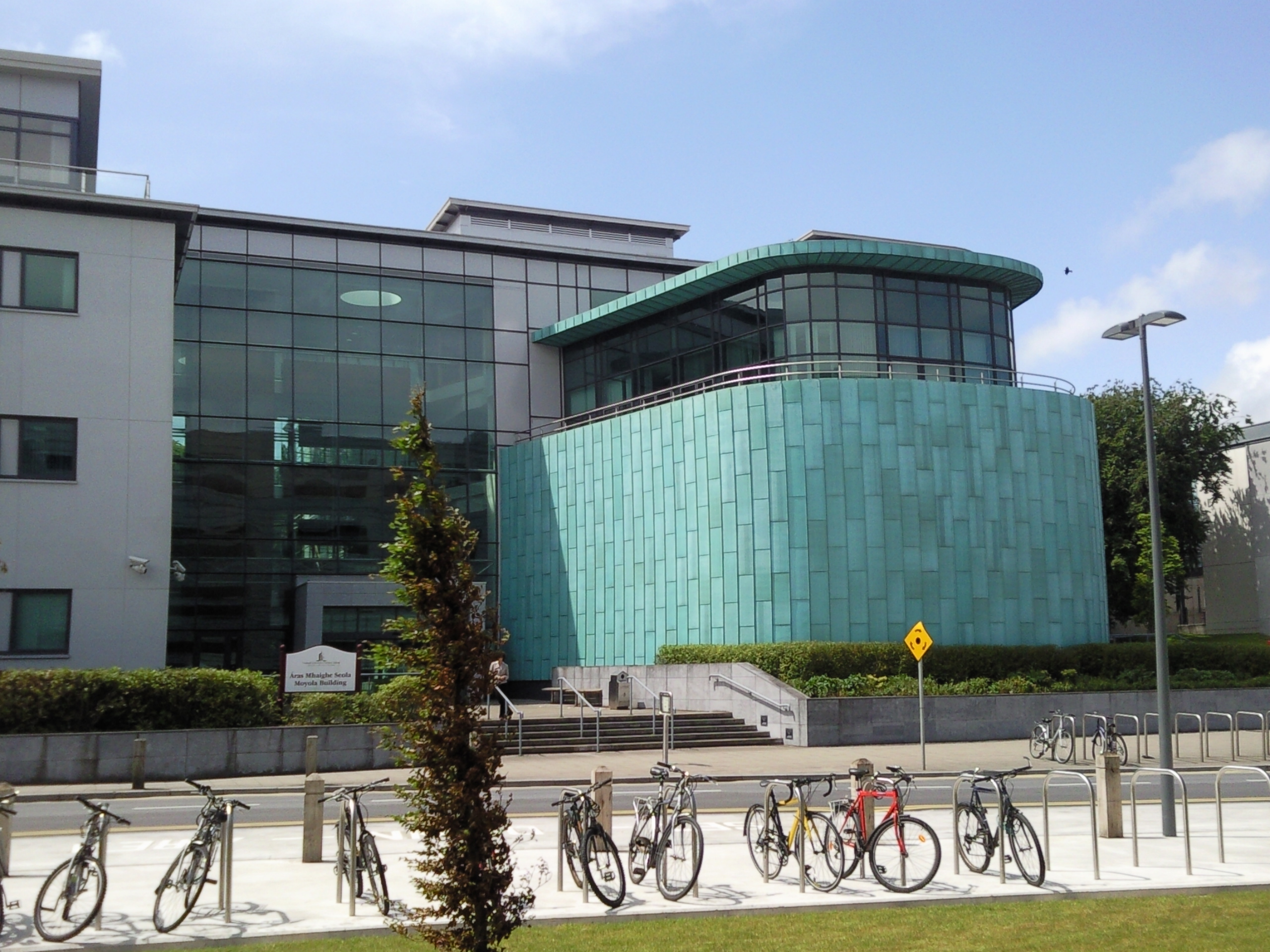
Áras Moyola, which houses the School of Nursing and Midwifery, the School of Political Science and Sociology and the School of Health Sciences

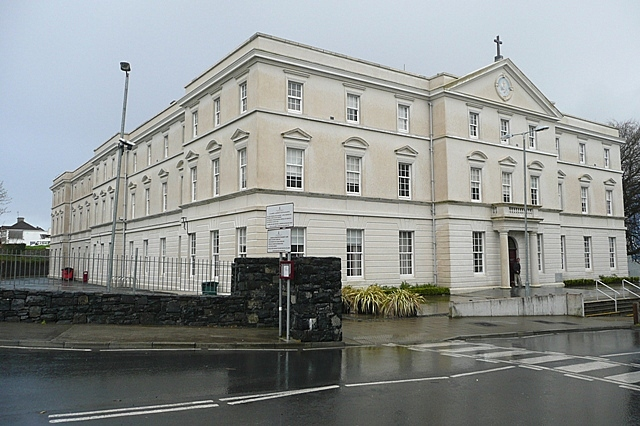
St Anthony's, which houses part of the JE Cairnes School of Business & Economics

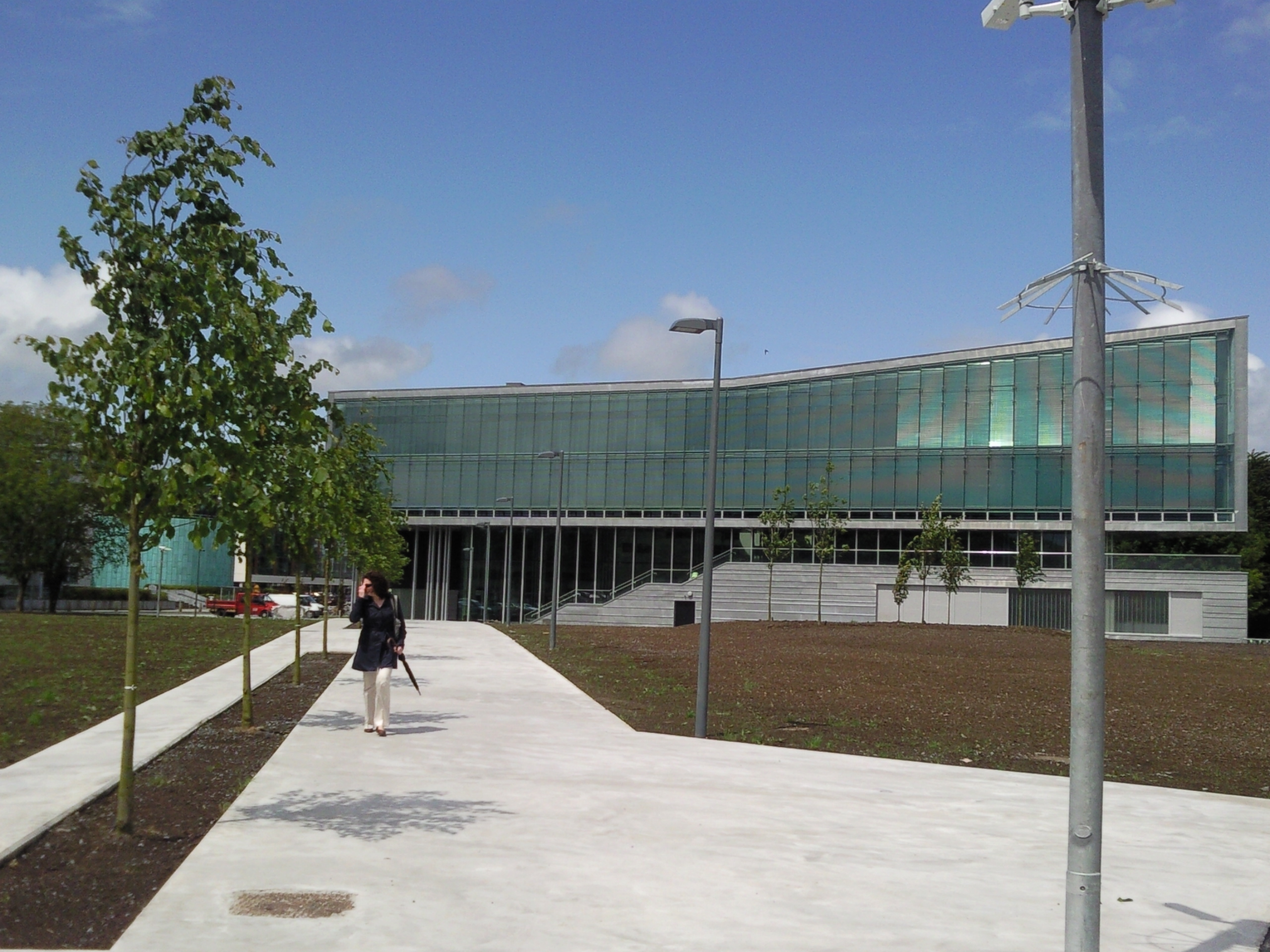
Alice Perry Engineering Building, which houses the College of Science and Engineering

The following are the current colleges and schools of the university:

- College of Arts, Social Sciences and Celtic Studies
  - Acadamh na hOllscolaíochta Gaeilge
  - School of Political Science and Sociology
  - School of Psychology
  - School of Education
  - School of Geography, Archaeology and Irish Studies
  - School of English, Media and Creative Arts
  - School of History and Philosophy
  - School of Languages, Literatures and Cultures
- College of Medicine, Nursing and Health Sciences
  - School of Health Sciences
  - School of Medicine
  - School of Nursing and Midwifery
- Adult Learning and Professional Development
- College of Business, Public Policy and Law
  - JE Cairnes School of Business and Economics
  - School of Law
  - Shannon College of Hotel Management
- College of Science and Engineering
  - School of Biological and Chemical Sciences
  - School of Computer Science
  - School of Engineering
  - School of Mathematical and Statistical Sciences
  - School of Natural Sciences

Since 2015 the Shannon College of Hotel Management has been fully incorporated into the university — becoming part of the College of Business, Public Policy & Law at Galway — formally marked by the Minister for Education and Skills Jan O'Sullivan at an event held in Shannon College on 9 November 2015. All staff of Shannon College of Hotel Management became staff of the university and all students of Shannon College of Hotel Management became students of the university.

== Research ==
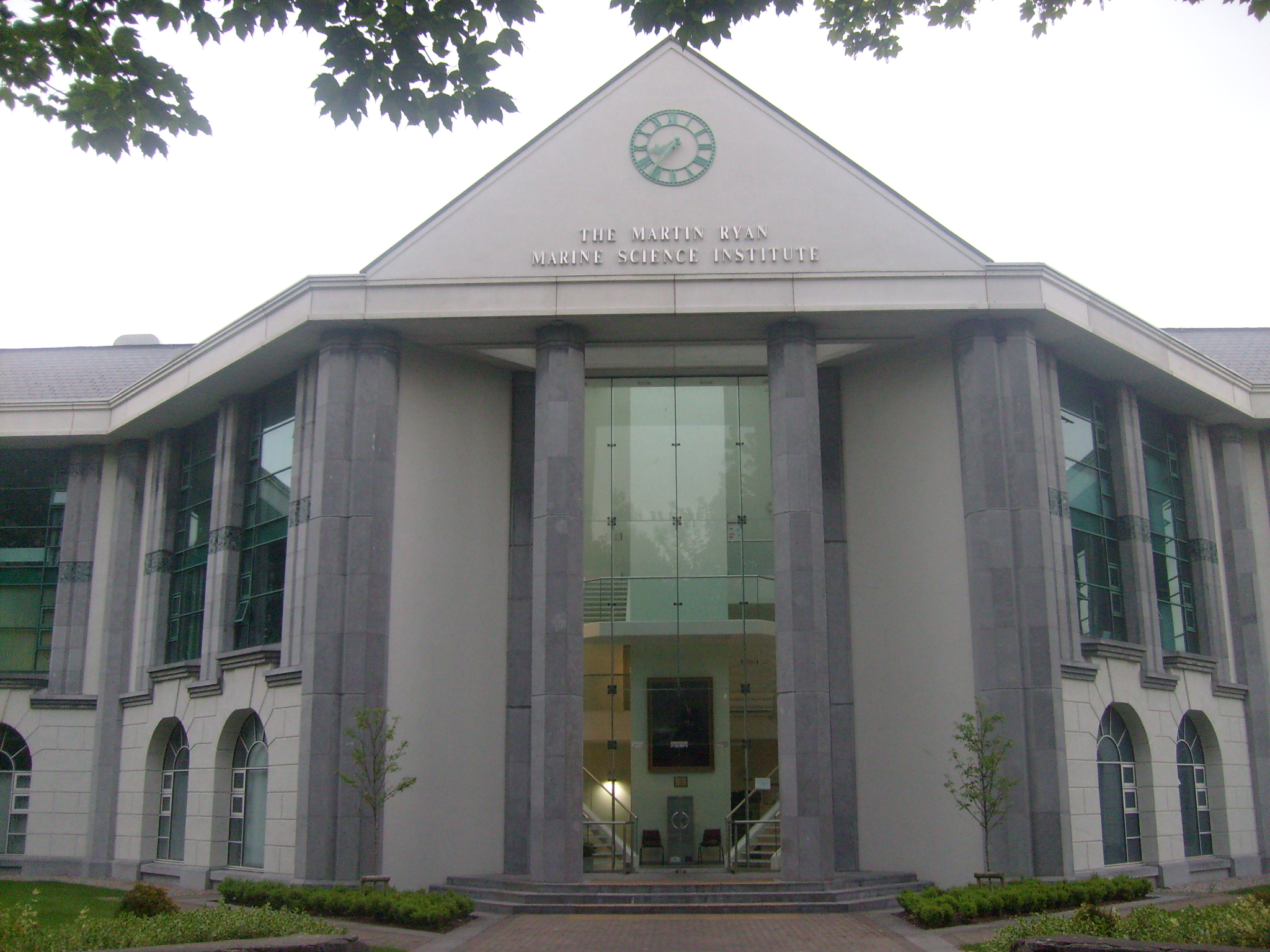
Ryan Institute

There are five designated Research Institutes and a number of Research Centres and Units at the University of Galway. Designated Research Institutes at the university are characterised by significant interdisciplinary (generally cross-College) and high-quality research activity, including extensive collaboration nationally and internationally. Examples of mould-breaking research include sugar coating devices and how spider bites can lead to hospitalisation.

== Foundation ==
Galway University Foundation (GUF) was established in 1998 with the intention of generating financial support for the university from private individuals and institutions. It nurtures relationships with donors for whom the university's approach to education appeals. The Foundation has many 'Priority Projects' in development.

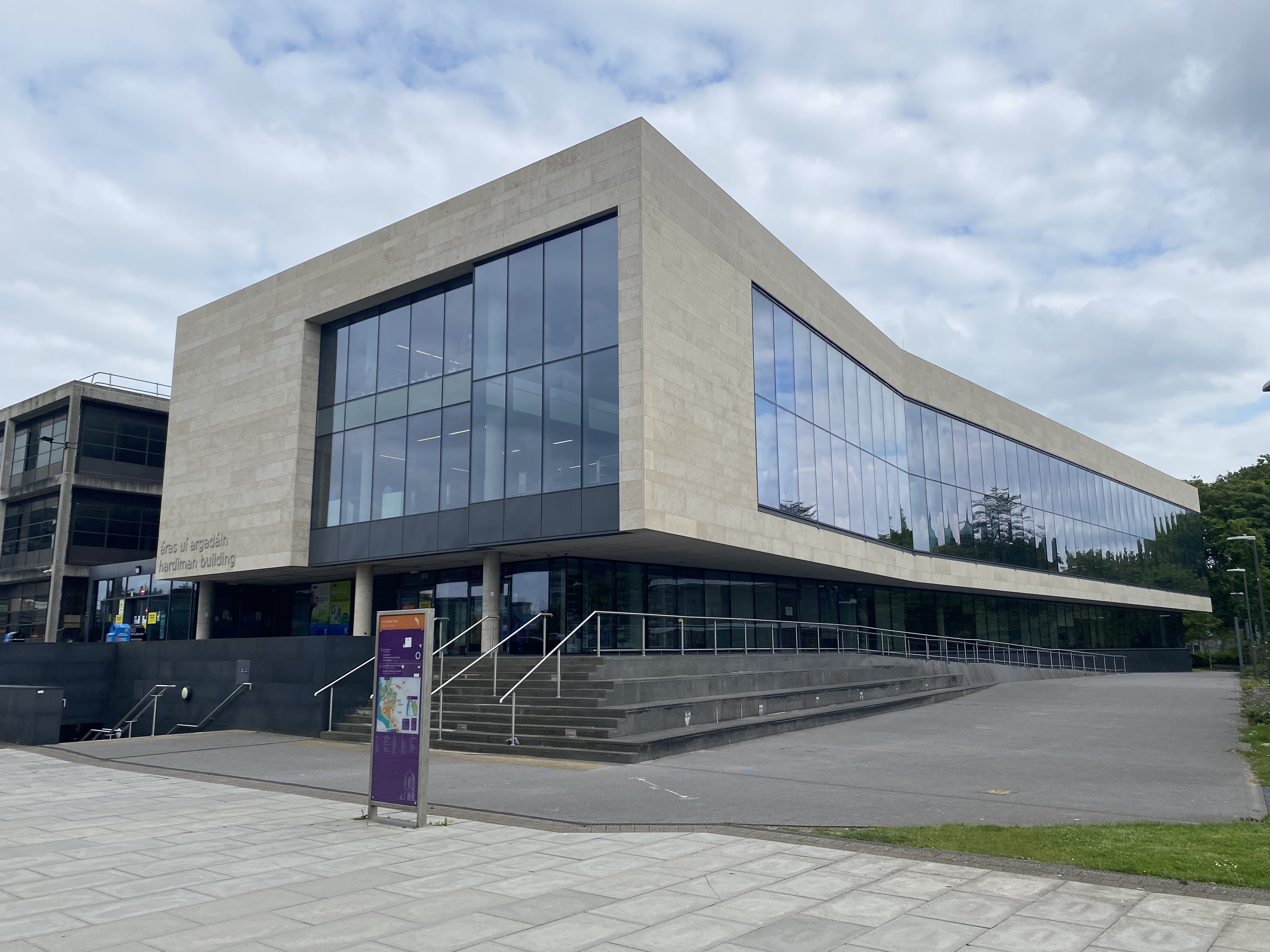
James Hardiman Library, University of Galway

The main library building of the University of Galway is named the James Hardiman Library after the library's first librarian, James Hardiman.

== Student life ==
=== Societies ===
University of Galway has about 150 active student societies, ranging from the academic to artistic and performing, lifestyle and wellbeing, religious and political, social action and volunteering, social and cultural, and special interest.

The oldest society on the campus is the Literary and Debating Society, founded in 1846. The university's drama society, Dramsoc, was founded in 1914 after the earliest recorded student production in 1904 demonstrated the need for a student-run drama society. Cumann Staire is one of Europe's oldest history societies, and is a member of Comhaltas na gCumann Staire and the International Students of History Association. The university's Fianna Fáil branch, Cumann de Barra, was founded in 1954, making it the oldest university political party branch in Ireland. Fine Gael's youth wing was founded in the university in 1973 during the Liam Cosgrave-led Fine Gael/Labour Coalition government, with Enda Kenny and Madeleine Taylor-Quinn among those behind its establishment there. Official Sinn Féin were also influential in campus politics in the 1970s, and Students Union Presidents Eamon Gilmore and Johnny Curran were party members. CompSoc (the university's computer society) is the oldest of its kind in the country, established in 1977.

Most of Ireland's main political parties have active societies at the university including Fianna Fáil, Fine Gael, Green, Labour, People Before Profit, Sinn Féin and the Social Democrats.

Flirt FM is a community radio station located on campus, spearheaded by the Radio Society. Sin Newspaper is the student-run news outlet of the university.

GUMS, the university musical society, hosts annual musicals in the Dubhlann/Black Box Theatre.

Societies are commonly classified between academic, artistic and performing, lifestyle and wellbeing, religious and political, Shannon campus, social action and volunteering, social and cultural, special interest, student services.

Special interest societies include societies such as Anime and Manga Society, Book Club, Sitcom Society, FanSci, Timelord, and Horror Society.

In 2014, the Christian and LGBT societies were involved in a showdown over same-sex marriage. The incident was provoked by the auditor of the Christian Society, running for the position of Equality Officer in that year's student union election. Earlier, in the late part of 2013, the university suspended the Legion of Mary Society after it failed to satisfactorily explain its connection to posters containing information on a Christian support group for homosexual persons.

An Cumann Gaelach and An Cumann Drámaíochta are the university's main Irish language societies, following the demise of the Cumann Craic.

=== Clubs ===
University of Galway has more than 40 sports clubs based on campus, ranging from indoor sports (such as archery, badminton, fencing, weightlifting, table tennis, and squash), to water sports (such as rowing, kayaking, sailing, windsurfing, and scuba diving), as well as martial arts (such as judo, karate, aikido, Muay Thai, kendo, and taekwondo), plus equestrian, triathlon, athletics, and snow sports.

The university also competes in the most popular Irish field sports of association football, Gaelic football, hurling, and rugby union, as well as cricket, hockey, and lacrosse.

University of Galway GAA compete in the Sigerson Cup (Gaelic football) and the Fitzgibbon Cup (hurling). They are the second most prolific winners of the Sigerson Cup.

University of Galway RFC compete in the Connacht Senior Cup, and are the competition's most successful side with 34 wins.

University of Galway F.C. compete in the Galway & District League, the Colleges and Universities Football League (CUFL), Collingwood Cup and Harding Cup (Freshers). They previously competed in the Connacht Senior League under their former name of NUI Galway F.C. and won the competition in 1990, as UCG.

The campus is home to a wide range of sport facilities. Facilities include Dangan Sportsground, where the university's GAA teams compete, and the Kingfisher, where Moycullen Basketball Club play their games.

=== Connacht Rugby ===
In 2013, the university announced it would sponsor Connacht Rugby, the nearby professional Pro12 (now URC) rugby union team, for the following three years and would put in place a "High Performance Education Partnership" that would give players from the Connacht Rugby Academy and age-grade teams the chance to educated there. At the time of the announcement 17 members of Connacht's squad were either attending the university as students or were graduates.

Within a few years of the start of the university's sponsorship of the Connacht Rugby Academy, the team had won, what was then the 2015–16 Pro12 title, for the first time by defeating Leinster in the 2016 Pro12 Grand Final. Seven players from the Connacht Rugby Academy played 55 times for their team during that campaign, with others in that squad also graduates of the Connacht Rugby Academy.

The deal was renewed in 2017, covering the period until 2019.

=== Students' Union ===
The Students' Union's primary role is to provide a recognised representative channel between undergraduates and the university and college authorities.

In February 2009, the university announced the Students' Union-run RAG Week would "no longer form part of the university calendar". The President of the Students' Union expressed the belief that the decision was unjustified, citing the more than €20,000 raised for charities that year. RAG Week continued unofficially until 2024, when the fundraising event returned with support from the Students' Union.

=== International ===
In 2011, international students made up over 12 percent of the student population at the University of Galway.

== People ==
=== Presidents ===
Name of President	Years
Joseph W. Kirwan	1845–1849
Edward Berwick	1849–1877
Thomas William Moffett	1877–1897
W.J.M. Starkie	1897–1899
Alexander Anderson	1899–1934
John Hynes	1934–1945
Pádraig de Brún	1945–1959
Martin J. Newell	1960–1975
Michael Duignan (interim)	1975
Colm Ó hEocha	1975–1996
Patrick F. Fottrell	1996–2000
Iognáid G. Ó Muircheartaigh	2000–2008
James J. Browne	2008–2018
Ciarán Ó hÓgartaigh	2018–2024
Peter McHugh (interim)	2024–2025
David J. Burn	2025–present

=== Notable alumni ===
- Keith Barry, performing artist
- Fiona Everard, national champion runner
- Ethna Gaffney, first female professor at the Royal College of Surgeons in Ireland
- Michael D. Higgins, 9th President of Ireland
- Catherine Connolly, 10th President of Ireland
- Enda Kenny, former Taoiseach
- Aifric Keogh and Fiona Murtagh Olympic bronze medalists Tokyo 2020
- Mark Heslin, judge of the High Court
- Máire Whelan, former Attorney General and current judge of the Court of Appeal
- Breandán Ó hEithir, writer and author
- Pat McGrath, news correspondent
- Wilfrid Napier O.F.M., Cardinal, Archbishop of Durban
- Conor Pope, journalist
- Gráinne Seoige, former news anchor and television presenter
- Martin Sheen, actor
- Nicola Coughlan, actor
- Rónán Mullen, Irish senator representing National University of Ireland (constituency)
- Enya (honorary doctorate)
- Heather Humphreys, Fine Gael politician
- Donogh O'Malley, Fianna Fáil politician
- Bobby Molloy, Fianna Fáil politician
- Frank Fahey (politician)
- Pat Rabbitte, former Irish Labour Party leader
- Séamus Brennan, former Irish government minister
- Alfred Keogh, former Director-General of the British Army Medical Services during the First World War.
- Brian McManus, host of the YouTube channel Real Engineering
- Michele Catasta, President and Head of AI at Replit

=== Notable faculty ===
- Emily Anderson - first professor of German
- Nicholas Canny - historian
- Colm McDonald - professor of psychiatry
- Michael D. Higgins - sociologist, 9th President of Ireland
- William King - geologist
- Alice Perry - engineer
- Gerard Quinn - jurist, specialist in international and comparative disability law and policy
- Niamh Reilly - sociologist and political scientist
- George Johnstone Stoney - physicist

== In literature and other media ==
University of Galway is the setting for, and is referred to in, numerous works of fiction.

Breandán Ó hEithir's novel Lig Sinn i gCathú, set in a thinly disguised Galway and telling the story of student life over four days in April 1949, has featured on the secondary school Leaving Certificate syllabus.

Tom Curtin's novel Melting Pot: An Irish Odyssey tells the story of three lads from University College Galway who leave Ireland for New York in 1969.

The university has also faced the legal consequences of gender inequality after a number of female lecturers starting proceedings against the university as gender as a grounds of discrimination is prohibited by Irish law.

== Art ==
The University of Galway houses an extensive collection of artworks, featuring a wide range of works and collections since 1845.

== Rankings and reputation ==
University rankings

Global – Overall
- ARWU World: 501–600 (2023)
- QS World: 284 (2026)
- THE World: 301–350 (2024)

University of Galway has been awarded the full five QS stars for excellence, and is ranked among the top 1 per cent of universities according to the 2018 QS World University Rankings. These rankings marked the sixth consecutive year that the university's ranking improved by these standards.

In 2016 and 2017, the university was ranked ahead of University College Dublin (UCD) and Queen's University Belfast (QUB) in the Academic Ranking of World Universities (ARWU), placing it second among Irish universities — behind only Trinity College Dublin (TCD). Likewise, in the Times Higher Education World University Rankings, Galway was ranked ahead of UCD and behind only TCD.

The Sunday Times University Guide has named the university as its "University of the Year" on three occasions. It won the Times's inaugural title in 2002–2003. A second title followed in 2009–2010. Galway won its third title in 2018.

QS World University Rankings
Overall Ranking	Arts & Humanities	Natural Sciences	Engineering & IT	Social Sciences	Life Sciences
2005
437	—N/a	—N/a	—N/a	—N/a	—N/a
2006
437	—N/a	—N/a	—N/a	—N/a	—N/a
2007
484	312	389	427	323	386
2008
368	—N/a	—N/a	—N/a	—N/a	260
2009
243	272	—N/a	—N/a	—N/a	250
2010
232	274	301–350	301–350	351–400	301–350
2011
298	389	379	367	—N/a	357
2012
287	345	388	—N/a	—N/a	335
2013
284	—N/a	—N/a	—N/a	—N/a	—N/a
2014
280	344	352	298	326	258
2015
271	—N/a	—N/a	—N/a	—N/a	—N/a
2016
249	—N/a	—N/a	—N/a	—N/a	—N/a
2017
243	—N/a	—N/a	—N/a	—N/a	—N/a

== See also ==
- Education in the Republic of Ireland
- List of universities in the Republic of Ireland
