= Claus Peter Zoller =

Claus Peter Zoller is a linguist and professor of South Asian Studies at the Department of Culture Studies and Oriental Languages of the University of Oslo. His research interests include Hindi literature and linguistics, the languages of the Western Himalayas (Western Pahari) and northern Pakistan (Dardic), cultural traditions and ethnography of those regions, as well as Romani linguistics. He is known for his work on the documentation of Indus Kohistani and Bangani, and his broader work on the linguistic history of Indo-Aryan languages.

He supports the Inner–Outer hypothesis of the subclassification of Indo-Aryan, a topic which he has studied in Zoller (2016).

== Works ==
- — (2005). A Grammar and Dictionary of Indus Kohistani. Vol. 1: Dictionary. Walter de Gruyter. ISBN 9783110179477.
- — (2007). "Is Bangani a V2 language?" (PDF). European Bulletin of Himalayan Research. 31: 83–142.
- — (2010). "Aspects of the early history of Romani". Acta Orientalia. 71: 243–312.
- — (2016). "Outer and Inner Indo-Aryan, and northern India as an ancient linguistic area". Acta Orientalia. 77: 71–132.
- — (2023). Indo-Aryan and the Linguistic History and Prehistory of North India. Harrassowitz Verlag. ISBN 978-3-447-12014-2. JSTOR jj.5274098.
