= Colm McDonald =

Irish psychiatrist

Colm McDonald is an Irish psychiatrist and a professor of psychiatry at the National University of Ireland, Galway (NUIG).

== Education ==
He graduated Doctor of Medicine in University College Dublin, and then became a resident physician at the Department of Psychiatry King's College London. He also received his Ph.D. from the Institute of Psychiatry, Psychology and Neuroscience at King's College, London.

== Academic career ==
McDonald is professor of psychiatry and director of the Clinical Neuroimaging Laboratory at NUIG.
