= Colm Ó hEocha =

Irish scientist and educationalist

Colm Ó hEocha (/oʊˈhoʊkə/; 19 September 1926 – 19 May 1997) was an Irish scientist and educationalist, who served as president of University College Galway and Chairman of the New Ireland Forum.

Ó hEocha was born in Dungarvan, County Waterford, in 1926. His father, Séamus Ó hEocha, known as An Fear Mór, was headmaster of the Irish-language college at An Rinn (Ring), and was known as a roving teacher of Irish for the Gaelic League.

Ó hEocha enrolled at University College Galway in 1945, and obtained his B.Sc. and M.Sc. in chemistry. He was subsequently awarded a scholarship which enabled him to continue his studies at the University of California, Los Angeles, where he obtained his Ph.D. He is a University of California, San Diego Alumnus, also receiving his Ph.D. from the Scripps Institution of Oceanography in La Jolla, California. Returning to Galway in 1955, he became a lecturer in biochemistry, and was appointed the first Professor of Biochemistry at the university in 1963.

Ó hEocha built up the Department of Biochemistry throughout the 1960s and 1970s, and was involved in attracting external research funding to the college. He was appointed Chairman of the Irish Science Council in 1967.

In 1975, following the retirement of Dr Martin J. Newell, Ó hEocha was elected to the presidency of the college. His term in office coincided with a rapid expansion in the numbers of students attending the institution, doubling during his 21-year tenure, and a corresponding increase in staff numbers. A lecture theatre in the Arts Millennium Building is named in his honour.

The Fine Gael–Labour Party coalition government established the New Ireland Forum in 1983 as a mechanism to develop an agreed approach to a settlement of the Northern Ireland issue. Ó hEocha was nominated by the Taoiseach Garret FitzGerald, to chair the forum. Ó hEocha's role is credited with bringing the forum to a constructive conclusion.

Dr Ó hEocha retired as President of UCG on his 70th birthday in July 1996. He was, by then, the longest-serving university president in Ireland.

Ó hEocha also served as Pro-Vice Chancellor of the National University of Ireland, Chairman of the Arts Council, and Chairman of the Interim Local Radio Commission. He was a member of the Royal Irish Academy, and a recipient of honorary degrees from Queen's University, Belfast, the University of Dublin, and the University of Limerick. He was an honorary life member of the Galway Chamber of Commerce and Industry, and was awarded the Freedom of the City of Galway in 1995. The Government of France appointed him a Chevalier of the Legion d'Honneur in the early 1980s.

Ó hEocha died at his home in Galway on 19 May 1997.

Academic offices
Preceded by Martin J. Newell	President of University College Galway; 1975–1996	Succeeded by Patrick F. Fottrell
