= James J. Browne =

Engineer, President of National University of Ireland, Galway. 2008-2018

- Education: University of Galway

James J. Browne is a former president of the University of Galway. Appointed in 2008, he served a ten-year term, completed in January 2018.

He is an engineering graduate of the university. He was awarded the degree of PhD by the University of Manchester in 1980 and appointed Personal Professor of Production Engineering at University of Galway in 1989. He was awarded the degree of DSc by the University of Manchester in 1990 for published work on the analysis and design of computer integrated manufacturing systems. He was elected dean of the Faculty of Engineering in 1995 and Registrar and deputy president of the university in 2000.

Browne's research work focused on the design and operation of automated manufacturing systems with a particular emphasis on shop floor control and manufacturing execution systems (MES), enterprise management systems, flexible manufacturing and assembly systems, reverse logistics, Industry 4.0 and circular manufacturing systems. He published 11 books and over 400 papers; including Production Management Systems - An Integrated Perspective (2nd edition Prentice Hall, 1996), which was translated into French as Les Systemes de production dans un environment CIM and published by AFNOR (1994). He also published CAD CAM Principles, Practice and Manufacturing Management, published by Addison-Wesley in 1988, subsequently translated into Chinese by Prentice Hall.

== Honours ==
Browne is a member of the Royal Irish Academy and a Fellow of the Irish Academy of Engineering.

Browne has received the title of Chevalier de l'Ordre des Palmes Académiques from the French Ambassador in Ireland, H.E. Jean-Pierre Thébault.

== Family ==
Browne is married and the couple have four sons. All four of his sons attended St Joseph's Patrician College and all became engineering graduates during Browne's time as president of the University of Galway.

He is the brother of Raymond Browne, the Bishop of the Roman Catholic Diocese of Kerry.

Academic offices
Preceded by Patrick F. Fottrell	President of University College Galway; 2008–2018	Succeeded by Ciarán Ó hÓgartaigh
