= Séamus Ó hEocha =

Irish politician and educator (1880–1959)

Senator
- In office 27 April 1938 – 7 September 1938
- Constituency: Cultural and Educational Panel

Personal details
- Born: James Hough; 16 December 1880; County Limerick, Ireland
- Died: 19 September 1959 (aged 78); Cork, Ireland
- Political party: Independent
- Spouse: Mairéad Ní Dhruacháin
- Children: 3, including Colm

Séamus Ó hEocha (Note: Older spelling Seumas Ó hEoċada (or hEochadha); sometimes referred to as "Seamus Uas Ó hEochadha", where "Uas" is simply an abbreviation of Uasal "Mister".) (16 December 1880 – 19 September 1959) nicknamed "An Fear Mór" (Irish for 'the Big Man', alluding to his stature), was an Irish educator and briefly an independent senator. He was active in the Gaelic League and became head teacher of Coláiste na Rinne in County Waterford.

== Early and personal life ==
Ó hEocha was born James Hough in Ballyshane, Monagea, south of Newcastle West, County Limerick. He was one of six children of David Hough, a farmer, and his wife Honora, née Dowling. His mother tongue was English. After primary school he worked in Dublin and attended Irish classes in the Gaelic League with Brian O'Higgins. He considered emigrating to the United States where his relative P. H. McCarthy was an influential trade unionist. Instead he got a job teaching Irish for the League around County Kildare.

He married Mairéad Ní Dhruacháin and they had three children, including Colm. He died in Bon Secours Hospital, Cork, and his funeral mass was celebrated by Daniel Cohalan, Bishop of Waterford and Lismore, and attended by the President, Éamon de Valera, and other political and Irish-language figures.

== Career ==
Ó hEocha studied Irish in Coláiste na Mumhan in Ballingeary, passing an exam in 1906 and gaining the nickname "An Fear Mór" in 1908. He worked as a timire, organising Irish classes around Munster for the Gaelic League. Later he taught Irish in Cistercian College, Roscrea and Mungret College. Having earlier helped pay for the building of Coláiste na Rinne in 1906, he became its principal when it became a primary school in 1919. He and the Coláiste more generally were credited with slowing the encroachment of English as the vernacular into the small Ring Gaeltacht, although in later years he was pessimistic about its survival.

In 1920 The Educational Company of Ireland published as a reader Seanchas agus Scéilíní Simplidhe dá Ghaedhil óga na hÉireann, a collection of stories which had appeared in Pobal, a Limerick paper. Later readers were Géilín chun na leanbhaí thabhairt isteach ar léigheamh na Gaedhilge (1923), Bréagán do pháistí óga na h-Éireann, and Féirín do leanbhaidhe óga na hÉíreann. He also edited a collection of stories by Micil Ó Muirgheasa, a seanchaí from Ring.

Ó hEocha helped start two factories in Dungarvan, one for leather and the other for glue and gelatin. He was a member of the Gaeltacht Commission in 1925–1926, the governing body of University College Cork in 1945, and the Irish Tourist Board in 1941–1942. He presided over the 1949 Oireachtas na Gaeilge.

== 1938 Seanad ==
Ó hEocha served in the brief 2nd Seanad, convened in April 1938 after the revival of Seanad Éireann under the 1937 Constitution. He was nominated on the Cultural and Educational Panel by the Irish Technical Education Association. Although the opposition senators hoped to have him nominated unopposed as Leas-Cathaoirleach, the Fianna Fáil senators, then in government, successfully nominated one of their own, Pádraic Ó Máille. This was an early indication that the revived Seanad would be run along party lines, mirroring Dáil Éireann, the lower house. Ó hEochadha was not a member of subsequent Seanads.
