= Patrick F. Fottrell =

President of University of Galway from 1996 to 2000

Patrick F. Fottrell was President of the University of Galway between 1996 and 2000. He was appointed Chair of Biochemistry in December 1976. A lecture theatre in the Arts Millennium Building on the university campus is named after him. He became Chairperson of Science Foundation Ireland (SFI) in 2003.

Academic offices
| Preceded by Colm Ó hEocha | President of University College Galway; 1996–2000 | Succeeded by Iognáid G. Ó Muircheartaigh |
