= Martin J. Newell =

Irish mathematician and educationalist

Martin Joseph Newell (Máirtín Ó Tnúthail) (1910 - 1985) was an Irish mathematician and educationalist, who served as President of University College Galway from 1960 to 1975.

Martin J. Newell was born in 1910, and received his secondary education at St. Joseph's Patrician College, Galway, before entering University College Galway (UCG). He was auditor of the college's Literary and Debating Society for the 1928-1929 session, and graduated with a B.Sc. in 1929 and an M.Sc. in 1930, both with first class honours. He then proceeded to St. John's College, Cambridge, where he spent three years, eventually engaging in research on quantum theory with Ralph Fowler. Newell returned to UCG as a lecturer in mathematics in 1935, and was appointed Professor of Mathematics in 1955. In 1960, he was appointed to succeed Monsignor Pádraig de Brún as President of the college. He held the office of president until his retirement in 1975. A lecture theatre in the Arts Millennium Building is named in his honour.

Newell was the recipient of a D.Sc. (1952) from the National University of Ireland, and an LL.D. (honoris causa) from the University of Dublin. He died in 1985.

Martin J. Newell is the father of mathematician and Gaelic footballer Martin Leonard Newell.

Academic offices
Preceded by Pádraig de Brún	President of University College Galway; 1960–1975	Succeeded by Colm Ó hEocha
