= List of members of the National Academy of Engineering (natural resources) =

This list is a subsection of the List of members of the National Academy of Engineering, which includes members and international members of the United States National Academy of Engineering, living and deceased, each affiliated with one of the academy's disciplinary sections. Members are listed under their primary section, and each entry gives the person's name, primary institution, and election year. For deceased members, the year of death is noted.

== Natural Resources Engineering ==
Name	Institution	Year elected
Henrik Ager-Hanssen (died 2005)	AGER Energy Management AS	1989
Mohammed Yahya Al Qahtani	Aramco	2025
S.M. Farouq Ali	University of Houston	2009
Mary Pikul Anderson	University of Wisconsin–Madison	2006
Frank F. Aplan (died 2020)	Pennsylvania State University	1989
Nathaniel Arbiter (died 2008)	Columbia University	1977
Barbara Jean Arnold	Pennsylvania State University	2026
James R. Arnold	Taproot Construction, LLC	2021
Kenneth E. Arnold	WorleyParsons	2005
R. Lyndon Arscott	International Association of Oil and Gas Producers	2006
Jamal J. Azar	University of Tulsa	2004
Khalid Aziz	Stanford University	1996
Margaret Katherine Banks	Texas A&M University	2014
Grigory Isaakovich Barenblatt (died 2018)	Institute of Oceanology	1992
Thomas D. Barrow (died 2011)	Thomson-Barrow Corporation	1974
Robert W. Bartlett (died 2023)	Drilling Technology Inc.	1995
Osvaldo A. Bascur	OSB Digital, LLC	2025
Robin J. Batterham	University of Melbourne	2004
Robert F. Bauer (died 2011)	Bauer Ranch Partnership Ltd.	1969
Robert Ray Beebe (died 2011)	Independent Consultant	1990
Barbara A. Bekins	U.S. Geological Survey	2020
Robert R. Berg (died 2006)	Texas A&M University	1988
Asmeret Asefaw Berhe	University of California, Merced	2023
Peter John Bethell	Cardno	2014
Thomas Alwin Blasingame	Texas A&M University	2026
Kenneth A. Blenkarn (died 2022)	Amoco Production Company	1987
Martin Julian Blunt	Imperial College London	2025
Mark P. Board	Hecla Mining Company	2014
H. Raymond Brannon Jr. (died 1994)	Exxon	1980
Susan L. Brantley	Pennsylvania State University	2025
John D. Bredehoeft (died 2023)	The Hydrodynamics Group	1994
Corale L. Brierley	Brierley Consultancy LLC	1999
James A. Brierley	Brierley Consultancy LLC	2002
James P. Brill	University of Tulsa	1997
George H Brimhall	University of California, Berkeley	2001
Edwin Thomas Brown	University of Queensland	2022
Kermit E. Brown (died 2009)	Independent Consultant	1987
John C. Calhoun Jr. (died 2012)	The Texas A&M University System	1985
John M. Campbell Sr. (died 2013)	Independent Consultant	1991
Jesus Carrera	Spanish National Research Council	2018
Ben H. Caudle (died 2019)	The University of Texas at Austin	1988
Michael A. Celia	Princeton University	2016
Zhangxing John Chen	University of Calgary	2024
John A. Cherry	University of Guelph	2013
Virginia Sampaio Teixeira Ciminelli	Universidade Federal de Minas Gerais	2014
Jon F. Claerbout	Stanford University	1988
Brian O. Clark	Schlumberger	2010
Keith H. Coats (died 2016)	Coats Engineering	1988
James M. Coleman (died 2023)	Louisiana State University and Agricultural and Mechanical College	1990
Harry M. Conger	Freeport-McMoRan	1990
Harry M. Red Conger IV	Freeport Mining Company	2019
Neville G. W. Cook (died 1998)	University of California, Berkeley	1988
Steven Lee Crouch	University of Minnesota	2013
Frank Kenneth Crundwell	CM Solutions Pty Ltd.	2023
Peter A. Cundall	Itasca Consulting Group	2008
Lawrence B. Curtis (died 2017)	Conoco	1988
Akhil Datta-Gupta	Texas A&M University	2012
Ghislain de Marsily (died 2024)	Sorbonne University	1999
Ruth S. DeFries	Columbia University	2024
Emmanuel Detournay	University of Minnesota	2016
Michael Dettinger	Scripps Institution of Oceanography	2022
Daniel N. Dietz (died 1988)	Delft University of Technology	1988
Birol Dindoruk	University of Houston	2017
Ali H. Dogru	Aramco Americas	2017
Elaine Jay Dorward-King	Sibanye-Stillwater	2024
Fiona M. Doyle	University of California, Berkeley	2016
David Bruce Dreisinger	University of British Columbia	2023
Louis Durlofsky	Stanford University	2022
Robert C. Earlougher Jr. (died 2011)	Marathon Oil	1996
Christine A. Ehlig-Economides	University of Houston	2003
Kathy Jane Ehrig	BHP	2023
Farouk El-Baz	Boston University	2002
Lincoln F. Elkins (died 2000)	Independent Consultant	1980
Lloyd E. Elkins Sr. (died 2004)	Independent Consultant	1976
Derek Elsworth	Pennsylvania State University	2015
Iraj Ershaghi	University of Southern California	2014
Guilherme de Oliveira Estrella	Petroleo Brasileiro S/A	2011
Lorne G. Everett	LEA Environmental, Inc	2025
Rodney Charles Ewing (died 2024)	Stanford University	2017
Charles Fairhurst	Itasca Consulting Group	1991
Thomas V. Falkie (died 2019)	Berwind Natural Resources Corporation	1989
Michael J. Fetkovich (died 2020)	Phillips Petroleum Company	2005
A.J. Field (died 2009)	Independent Consultant	1974
Barbara A. Filas	Independent Consultant	2022
Abbas Firoozabadi	Rice University	2011
William L. Fisher	The University of Texas at Austin	1994
Peter T. Flawn (died 2017)	The University of Texas at Austin	1974
K. S. Eric Forssberg	Luleå University of Technology	2001
Roy Allan Freeze	R. Allan Freeze Engineering Inc.	2015
Douglas W. Fuerstenau	University of California, Berkeley	1976
Maurice C. Fuerstenau (died 2012)	University of Nevada, Reno	1991
Albert P. Gagnebin (died 1999)	Inco Limited	1974
James E. Gebhardt	FLSmidth	2024
Donald W. Gentry (died 2012)	Independent Consultant	1996
John L. Gidley (died 2009)	John L. Gidley and Associates, Inc.	1994
W. Barney Gogarty (died 2024)	W. Barney Gogarty & Associates, Inc.	1990
William C. Goins Jr. (died 2009)	O'Brien-Goins-Simpson & Associates, Inc.	1990
Gary J. Goldberg	BHP	2021
Richard E. Goodman (died 2025)	University of California, Berkeley	1991
Steven M. Gorelick	Stanford University	2012
George W. Govier (died 2016)	Govier Consulting Services, Ltd.	1979
William Guerin Gray	The University of North Carolina at Chapel Hill	2018
William A. Griffith (died 2009)	Hecla Mining Company	1998
Henry J. Gruy (died 2012)	H.J. Gruy and Associates, Inc.	1989
Alberto Guadagnini	Politecnico di Milano	2024
Michel T. Halbouty (died 2004)	Michel T. Halbouty Energy Company	1979
Kenneth N. Han	South Dakota School of Mines and Technology	1996
Leonard Harris (died 2024)	Resource Development, Inc (RDI)	2022
Susan Therese Largier Harrison	University of Cape Town	2020
Fred L. Hartley (died 1990)	Unocal Corporation	1980
Howard L. Hartman (died 2002)	The University of Alabama	1994
Charles Harvey	Massachusetts Institute of Technology	2026
Nick Hazen	Hazen Research, Inc.	2021
Thomas W. Healy	University of Melbourne	2008
John A. Herbst (died 2025)	University of Utah	1992
Mary Catherine Hill	University of Kansas	2021
George J. Hirasaki	Rice University	1991
J. Brent Hiskey	University of Arizona	1997
Claude R. Hocott (died 2001)	The University of Texas at Austin	1974
Evert Hoek (died 2024)	Evert Hoek Consulting Engineer Inc.	2006
Richard Hogg	Pennsylvania State University	2012
Stephen A. Holditch (died 2019)	Texas A&M University	1995
Vicki Ann Hollub	Occidental Petroleum	2024
Roland Nicholas Horne	Stanford University	2002
Joe E. House (died 1998)	Independent Consultant	1995
Susan S. Hubbard	Oak Ridge National Laboratory	2020
John Rossman Huff	Oceaneering International	2013
Chun Huh	The University of Texas at Austin	2018
William Andrew Hustrulid (died 2019)	Hustrulid Mining Services	2007
Steven E. Ingebritsen	U.S. Geological Survey	2019
Iwao Iwasaki	University of Minnesota Duluth	1996
Lisa P. Jackson	Apple Inc.	2023
Graeme J. Jameson	University of Newcastle	2015
Russell Taylor Johns	Pennsylvania State University	2025
Denise C. Johnson	Caterpillar Inc.	2025
Gunther F. Joklik	Kennecott Corporation	1989
Samuel Esson Jonah	Jonah Capital	2019
Andre G. Journel	Stanford University	1998
Prakash C. Kapur	Indian Institute of Technology Delhi	2009
Donald L. Katz (died 1989)	University of Michigan	1968
Hossein Kazemi	Colorado School of Mines	1999
Jitendra Kikani	Chevron Corporation	2026
R. Peter King (died 2006)	University of Utah	2003
Robert Leonard Kleinberg	Schlumberger	2015
Jessica Elzea Kogel (died 2023)	National Institute for Occupational Safety and Health	2019
Ingrid Kogel-Knabner	Technical University of Munich	2025
Leonard F. Konikow	U.S. Geological Survey	2015
Randal D. Koster	NASA Goddard Space Flight Center	2026
Anthony R. Kovscek	Stanford University	2023
Raymond Arthur Kreig	R.A. Kreig & Associates	2025
Danie G. Krige (died 2013)	Independent Consultant	2010
Fikri J. Kuchuk	Schlumberger	2012
Larry W. Lake	The University of Texas at Austin	1997
Philip E. LaMoreaux Sr. (died 2008)	P.E. LaMoreaux and Associates, Inc.	1987
W. John Lee	Texas A&M University	1993
Heber Cinco Ley	Jaguar Exploración y Producción	2026
Jack E. Little	Shell Oil Company	1997
Barbara Sherwood Lollar	University of Toronto	2021
J. David Lowell (died 2020)	CIC Resources	1999
Arthur Lubinski (died 1996)	Independent Consultant	1986
Gerald H. Luttrell	Virginia Polytechnic Institute and State University	2013
Plato Malozemoff (died 1997)	Newmont	1969
Michael James Mankosa	Eriez Magnetics	2018
Anna M. Marabini (died 2023)	Independent Consultant	1992
Christopher Mark	Mine Safety and Health Administration	2026
John O. Marsden	John O. Marsden, LLC	2010
Jacob H. Masliyah	University of Alberta	2011
Charles S. Matthews (died 2008)	Shell Oil Company	1985
William C. Maurer	Maurer Engineering Inc.	1992
Terence P. McNulty	T.P. McNulty and Associates, Inc.	2005
Marcia McNutt	National Academy of Sciences	2021
D. Nathan Meehan	Texas A&M University	2022
Jan D. Miller	University of Utah	1993
Keith K. Millheim	Strategic Worldwide LLC	1990
Paul Christopher Damian Milly	Independent	2024
Mahta Moghaddam	University of Southern California	2019
Norman R. Morrow	University of Wyoming	2001
Richard M. Morrow (died 2013)	Amoco	1986
Brij Mohan Moudgil	University of Florida	2002
Oliver C. Mullins	Schlumberger	2018
Haydn H. Murray (died 2015)	Indiana University	2003
Morris Muskat (died 1998)	Independent Consultant	1983
D. R. Nagaraj	Columbia University	2006
John A.L. Napier	University of Pretoria	2018
John Neerhout Jr.	Drilling Technology Inc.	1992
Shlomo P. Neuman	University of Arizona	1992
Virginia T. Norwood (died 2023)	Hughes Aircraft Company	2023
Amos M. Nur (died 2024)	Stanford University	2001
Cyril T. O'Connor	University of Cape Town	2017
Thomas J. O'Neil	Cleveland-Cliffs	1999
William R. Opie (died 2013)	AMAX Base Metals Research & Development, Inc.	1982
Dani Or	University of Nevada, Reno	2022
Franklin M. Orr Jr.	Stanford University	2000
Sara N. Ortwein	ExxonMobil	2020
Kwadwo Osseo-Asare	Pennsylvania State University	2004
Carel Otte (died 2018)	Chevron Corporation	1988
Sorab Panday	GSI Environmental Inc.	2017
Stavros S. Papadopulos	S.S. Papadopulos & Associates, Inc.	2009
Beth Louise Parker	University of Guelph	2025
Donald W. Peaceman (died 2017)	Independent Consultant	1999
J. R. Anthony Pearson	Drilling Technology Inc.	1980
Syd S. Peng	West Virginia University	2007
Thomas K. Perkins	ARCO Exploration and Production Technology	1984
Christa Dianne Peters-Lidard	WtrSense, LLC	2023
George F. Pinder	University of Vermont	2010
Gary A. Pope	The University of Texas at Austin	1999
William N. Poundstone (died 2015)	Consolidation Coal Company	1977
P. Pradip	Tata Consultancy Services	2012
Michael Prats (died 2026)	Michael Prats & Associates, Inc.	1986
Karsten Pruess	Lawrence Berkeley National Laboratory	2011
Jeffery J. Puschell	Northrop Grumman	2024
Laura J. Pyrak-Nolte	Purdue University	2021
Henry H. Rachford Jr. (died 2022)	GL Industrial Services, Inc.	2000
Clayton J. Radke	University of California, Berkeley	2015
Rajagopal S. Raghavan	Phillips Petroleum Company	2004
T. S. Ramakrishnan	Schlumberger-Doll Research	2023
Raja V. Ramani	Pennsylvania State University	2005
Henry J. Ramey Jr. (died 1993)	Stanford University	1981
Lee R. Raymond	ExxonMobil	1999
Jean-Michel M. Rendu	Independent Consultant	1997
Kenneth J. Richards (died 2008)	Kerr-McGee	2000
Joseph G. Richardson (died 2007)	J. Richardson Consultants, Inc.	1988
Susan D. Richardson	University of South Carolina	2024
Francisco F. Roberto	Newmont	2020
Enders A. Robinson (died 2022)	Columbia University	1988
Donald G. Russell (died 2015)	Russell Companies	1982
Fernando Samaniego	Universidad Nacional Autonoma de Mexico	2005
Carl H. Savit (died 1996)	Western Geophysical Company	1995
Bridget R. Scanlon	The University of Texas at Austin	2016
Klaus Schoenert (died 2011)	Technical University of Clausthal	1991
Christopher H. Scholz	Columbia University	2023
Frank J. Schuh (died 2020)	Drilling Technology Inc.	1989
Glenn A. Schurman (died 2010)	Chevron Corporation	1980
Kate M. Scow	University of California, Davis	2022
Antonin Settari	University of Calgary	2026
Mukul M. Sharma	The University of Texas at Austin	2018
William Henry Silcox (died 2015)	Chevron Corporation	1986
Robert M. Sneider (died 2005)	Robert M. Sneider Exploration, Inc.	2000
Timothy Roy Snider	Teck Resources Limited	2026
Ponisseril Somasundaran	Columbia University	1985
Monroe E. Spaght (died 1993)	Royal Dutch/Shell Group	1969
Fred I. Stalkup	ARCO Exploration and Production Technology	1987
Marshall B. Standing (died 2010)	Chevron Corporation	1984
George L. Stegemeier	GLS Engineering, Inc.	2001
Richard J. Stegemeier	Unocal Corporation	1992
Daniel B. Stephens	Daniel B. Stephens & Associates, Inc.	2019
Stanley C. Suboleski	Massey, LC	2004
John E. Swearingen (died 2007)	The Standard Oil Company, Indiana	1969
Ganesh C. Thakur	University of Houston	2016
L. Kent Thomas (died 2020)	Upstream Technology	2016
Leon Thomsen	University of Houston	2022
Rex W. Tillerson	ExxonMobil	2013
Spencer R. Titley (died 2019)	University of Arizona	2005
Margaret Susan Torn	Berkeley Lab	2025
Sven Treitel (died 2024)	TriDekon, Inc.	2024
Nikhil C. Trivedi	Idekin International	2021
Richard F. Tucker (died 2009)	Mobil	1987
Alejandro López Valdivieso (died 2024)	Universidad Autonoma de San Luis Potosi	2021
Rien van Genuchten	Federal University of Rio de Janeiro	2024
Allyn C. Vine (died 1994)	Woods Hole Oceanographic Institution	1982
Harold J. Vinegar	Ben-Gurion University	2003
Barry Voight	Pennsylvania State University	2017
Rong-Yu Wan (died 2009)	Independent Consultant	2000
Dianzuo Wang (died 2023)	Chinese Academy of Engineering	1990
Milton H. Ward (died 2011)	Ward Resources Inc.	1994
Joseph E. Warren (died 2012)	Frontier Resources International, Plc.	1993
Tommy M. Warren	Tesco Corporation	2006
Robert J. Weimer (died 2021)	Colorado School of Mines	1992
Mary F. Wheeler	The University of Texas at Austin	1998
J. Edward White (died 2003)	Colorado School of Mines	1989
G. Paul Willhite (died 2022)	University of Kansas	2006
Paul A. Witherspoon (died 2012)	University of California, Berkeley	1989
Dawn Jeannine Wright	Environmental Systems Research Institute, Inc.	2023
Ruilin Yang	Orica	2026
Oz Yilmaz	Anatolian Geophysical	2022
Roe-Hoan Yoon	Virginia Polytechnic Institute and State University	2008
Yannis C. Yortsos	University of Southern California	2008
Lily Y. Young	Rutgers University	2023
A. Tobey Yu (died 2009)	ORBA Corporation	1989
Linda Zall	Central Intelligence Agency	2023
Howard Allan Zebker	Stanford University	2024
Dongxiao Don Zhang	Peking University	2017
Jie Zhang	GeoTomo, LLC	2020
Mark D. Zoback	Stanford University	2011
