= Charles V. Theis =

American hydrogeologist (1900–1987)

Charles Vernon Theis (known during his life as C.V. Theis; March 27, 1900 – July 31, 1987) was an American hydrogeologist and winner of the 1984 Robert E. Horton Medal.

== Life ==
Theis was born on March 27, 1900, in Newport, Kentucky, and throughout elementary school excelled in mathematics and was allowed to skip grades. He graduated from Newport High School at age 16. In the fall of 1917, he matriculated in civil engineering at the University of Cincinnati, where he would later be elected to Tau Beta Pi. He received his first degree in 1922, and later, in June 1929, received the first Ph.D. degree in geology awarded by the university.

In the summer of 1927, Theis had held a summer appointment with Arthur A. Baker of the U.S. Geological Survey mapping streams in Utah. Following the conferral of his doctorate, he began work as a geologist for the Army Corps of Engineers. In 1930, he was promoted to a new role and transferred to the Geological Survey; his first assignment there was conducting a groundwater study in Tennessee.

From 1932 to 1934, he researched aquifers in the High Plains. Finding the existing research methods unsatisfactory, he wrote to his friend from university, Clarence I. Lubin, for help deriving new equations to be used in field work. Although Lubin declined to be a coauthor, Theis published his work on nonequilibrium heat flow in groundwater in the American Geophysical Union Transactions, Economic Geology, and Civil Engineering. A key finding of this series of publications was that the share of groundwater withdrawals derived from storage depletion tends to decrease, while the portion derived from capture increases, over time. In 1934, Theis joined the hydrology section of the American Geophysical Union (AGU). In 1936, Theis was based in New Mexico and was made a district geologist there.

During World War II, Theis worked for the Military Geology Unit from Washington, D.C. He moved back to New Mexico in 1944. Beginning in the 1950s, Theis lived in Albuquerque, coordinated USGS research for the Atomic Energy Commission, and researched the application of hydrology to nuclear energy. He retired in 1970.

Theis had been made a fellow of the AGU in 1962, and received the union's Robert E. Horton Medal in 1984. He died on July 31, 1987.

== Legacy ==
The University of Cincinnati operates the C.V. Theis Groundwater Observatory, a research lab on groundwater conservation opened in 2017, as well as the Theis Environmental Monitoring and Modeling Site. Additionally, the American Institute of Hydrology awards the Charles V. Theis Award for Groundwater annually.

Theis is considered a key figure of the Meinzer era of hydrogeology; graduate courses exist in hydrogeology that devote class days to Theis' work in specific. The Theis solution remains a foundational concept in the study of aquifers into the 21st century.

== Sources ==
=== Biographical ===
- Bredehoeft, John D.; Theis, Charles V. (1984). "1984 Robert E. Horton Medal to Charles V. Theis". Eos. 65 (28): 436–437. doi:10.1029/EO065i028p00436.
- "Charles Vernon Theis". The Hydrogeologist Time Capsule. International Association of Hydrogeologists. (Note: See accompanying article: Bredehoeft, John D. (February 2008). "An interview with C.V. Theis". Profiles of Eminent Hydrogeologists. Hydrogeology Journal. 16 (1): 5–9. doi:10.1007/s10040-007-0248-z.)
- Clebsch, Alfred, ed. (1994). Selected Contributions to Ground-Water Hydrology by C.V. Theis, and a Review of His Life and Work. Water Supply Paper 2415. U.S. Geological Survey. doi:10.3133/wsp2415. (Note: Excerpt available as: White, Robert R.; Clebsch, Alfred. Ponce, Victor Miguel (ed.). "C.V. Theis: The Man and His Contributions to Hydrogeology". San Diego State University.)
- Freeze, R. Allan (May 1985). "Historical Correspondence Between C. V. Theis and C. I. Lubin". Eos. 66 (20): 442–443. doi:10.1029/EO066i020p00442-01. (Note: Republished as: Freeze, R. Allan (1990). "Historical Correspondence Between C. V. Theis and C. I. Lubin". In Gillmor, C. Stewart (ed.). History of Geophysics. Vol. 4. American Geophysical Union. pp. 41–42. doi:10.1029/HG004p0041. ISBN 978-0-87590-278-4.)
- White, Robert R. (December 1994). "Memorial to Charles Vernon Theis" (PDF). Memorials. 25. Geological Society of America.

=== Scientific ===
- Bredehoeft, John D. (July 2002). "The Water Budget Myth Revisited: Why Hydrogeologists Model". Groundwater. 40 (4): 340–345. doi:10.1111/j.1745-6584.2002.tb02511.x.
- Serrano, Sergio E. (May 1997). "The Theis Solution in Heterogeneous Aquifers". Groundwater. 35 (3): 463–467. doi:10.1111/j.1745-6584.1997.tb00106.x.
- Zech, Alraune; Müller, Sebastian; Mai, Juliane; Heße, Falk; Attinger, Sabine (August 2016). "Extending Theis' solution: Using transient pumping tests to estimate parameters of aquifer heterogeneity". Water Resources Research. 52 (8): 6156–6170. doi:10.1002/2015WR018509.
