= William Back (geologist) =

American geologist (1925–2008)

- Portrait in 1990
- Born: August 9, 1925; East St. Louis, Illinois, U.S.
- Died: January 31, 2008 (aged 82); Honolulu, Hawaii, U.S.
- Spouse: Connie Back (m. 1951)

Academic background
- Education: University of Illinois Urbana-Champaign (AB); University of California, Berkeley (MS); Harvard University (MPA); University of Nevada, Reno (PhD)
- Thesis: Chemical hydrogeology of the carbonate peninsulas of Florida and Yucatán (1969)
- Doctoral advisor: George Burke Maxey

Academic work
- Institutions: University of California, Irvine; National Fuel Cell Research Center

William “Bill” Back (August 9, 1925 – January 31, 2008) was an American hydrogeologist and geochemist. He made significant contributions to the study of ground water geochemistry, karst hydrogeology, and the evolution of carbonate aquifers. He was a scientist at the U.S. Geological Survey (USGS) from 1946 to 1997.

== Early life and education ==
Back was born on August 9, 1925, in East St. Louis, Illinois. He earned a Bachelor of Arts in geology in 1948 from the University of Illinois Urbana-Champaign. He later completed a Master of Science in geology at the University of California, Berkeley in 1955 and received a Master of Public Administration from Harvard University in 1956.

In 1969, he earned a Ph.D. in hydrogeology from the University of Nevada, Reno under the direction of George Burke Maxey, co-founder of the hydrogeology division of the Geological Society of America. His thesis studied the carbonate hydrogeology of the Florida peninsula and the Yucatán Peninsula.

== Career ==
Back began working with the U.S. Geological Survey in 1946 while still an undergraduate, holding summer appointments in Washington, California, and Alaska. He was a scientist on the National Research Program in hydrologic sciences at USGS headquarters in Reston, Virginia until his retirement in 1997.

His influential early research focused on hydrochemical facies, advancing the concept of interpreting groundwater chemistry by mapping its evolution along flowpaths. He became especially known for his work on carbonate aquifer systems and karst hydrogeology, collaborating extensively with Bruce B. Hanshaw and other geologists. Their investigations in Florida, Mexico's Yucatán Peninsula, and the Iberian Peninsula studied groundwater flow, chemical thermodynamics, radiocarbon dating, and geochemical modeling. Back and Hanshaw received the Meinzer Award in 1973 for their work on carbonate systems.

Back also contributed to research on contaminated aquifers, North American hydrogeology, and the effects of water resources on Native American communities. He served as an adjunct faculty member at George Washington University from 1975 to 1986.

Internationally, Back was active in the International Association of Hydrogeologists (IAH), serving as chairman of its Karst Commission. He helped foster scientific exchange between hydrogeologists in the Western world and China. In 1981 he participated in establishing a cooperative agreement between the USGS and China's Ministry of Natural Resources, and he played a significant role in international collaboration leading up to the 1988 IAH Congress in Guilin, China. He was also appointed to the UNESCO Food and Agriculture Organization, the United Nations Development Programme, and the U.S. Agency for International Development.

Back was a fellow of the Geological Society of America (GSA), where he led the hydrogeology division and served as division secretary and treasurer from 1964 to 1966 and later as chair in 1986. In 2008, the division established the Bill Back Graduate Student Research Award in his honor.

== Personal life ==
Back was married to Connie Back for 57 years. They had four children.

== Awards ==
- Meinzer Award (1973)
- Birdsall-Dreiss Distinguished Lectureship (1979)
- Meritorious Service Award, U.S. Department of the Interior (1982)
- Distinguished Service Award, U.S. Department of the Interior (1987)
- Distinguished Service Award, Geological Society of America (1988)
- M. King Hubbert Award (1995)
- Charles V. Theis Award (1997)

== Books ==
- Contemporary Hydrogeology: The George Burke Maxey Memorial Volume. Amsterdam: Elsevier, 1979. ISBN 978-0444418566
- Hydrogeology: The Geology of North America. Boulder, Colorado: Geological Society of America, 1988. ISBN 978-0-8137-5206-8
- Chemical Hydrogeology (Benchmark Papers in Geology, Vol. 73). Van Nostrand Reinhold Co, 1992. ISBN 978-0-87933-440-6
