= Meinzer Award =

Annual hydrogeology award

The O.E. Meinzer Award is the annual award of the Hydrogeology Division of the Geological Society of America. Established in 1965, it is named after Oscar Edward Meinzer who has been called the "father of modern groundwater hydrology". The Meinzer award recognizes the author or authors of a publication or body of publications that have significantly advanced the science of hydrogeology or a closely related field.

== List of recipients ==
Starting in 1973, the list of recipients is available from the National Ground Water Association website.

- 1965 Tóth, József
- 1966 McGuinness, C. L.
- 1967 Stallman, Robert W.
- 1968 Hantush, Mahdi S.
- 1969 Cooper, Hilton H., Jr.
- 1970 Stringfield, Victor T.
- 1971 Maxey, George B.
- 1972 Poland, Joseph F. and Davis, George H.
- 1973 Back, William and Hanshaw, Bruce B.
- 1974 Freeze, R. Allan
- 1975 Bredehoeft, John D. and Pinder, George F.
- 1976 Neuman, Shlomo P. and Witherspoon, Paul A.
- 1977 Rubin, Jacob and James, Ronald V.
- 1978 Nelson, William R.
- 1979 Sharp, John. M., Jr., and Domenico, P. A.
- 1980 Cooley, Richard. L.
- 1981 Bennett, Gordon D.
- 1983 Weeks, Edwin P.
- 1984 Schwartz, Franklin W. and Smith, Leslie. J.
- 1985 Cherry, John A.
- 1986 Narasimhan, T. N.
- 1987 Gelhar, Lynn W.
- 1988 Winograd, Isaac J.
- 1989 Davis, Stanley N.
- 1990 Hem, John D.
- 1991 Neuzil, Christopher E.
- 1992 Bethke, Craig M.
- 1993 Plummer, L. Niel
- 1994 Gorelick, Steven M.
- 1995 Garven, Grant
- 1996 Wilson, John L.
- 1997 Konikow, Leonard F.
- 1998 Mary P. Anderson
- 1999 Sudicky, Edward A.
- 2000 Chapelle, Francis H.
- 2001 Philips, Fred M.
- 2002 Winter, Thomas C.
- 2003 Ingebritsen, Steven E.
- 2004 de Marsily, Ghislain
- 2005 Siegel, Donald I.
- 2006 Pruess, Karsten
- 2007 Frape, Shaun
- 2008 Thorstenson, Donald C.
- 2009 Edmunds, W. Mike
- 2010 Baedecker, Mary Jo
- 2011 Fogg, Graham E.
- 2012 Parkhurst, David L.
- 2013 Zheng, Chunmiao
- 2014 Harvey, Charles F.
- 2015 Berkowitz, Brian
- 2016 Andrew T. Fisher
- 2017 Donald O. Rosenberry
- 2018 Shemin Ge
- 2019 Bridget R. Scanlon
- 2020 William W. Woessner
- 2021 Mark Person
- 2022 Parker, Beth
- 2023 Jiao, Jimmy J. J.
- 2024 Douglas Kip Solomon
- 2025 Michelle Walvoord

== See also ==
- List of geology awards
- List of earth sciences awards
- Prizes named after people
