= Bridget Scanlon =

Irish-American hydrogeologist

Bridget R. Scanlon (born 1959) is an Irish and American hydrogeologist known for her work on groundwater depletion and groundwater recharging, and of the effects of climate change and land usage patterns on groundwater. She is a senior research scientist in the Bureau of Economic Geology at the University of Texas at Austin, where she is head of the Sustainable Water Resources Program. Her research has included the use of GRACE satellite data to compare drought conditions in Texas and California.

== Education and career ==
Scanlon is originally from County Kerry in Ireland. She earned a bachelor's degree in geology at Trinity College Dublin in 1980, and worked with the Geological Survey of Ireland before moving to the US for graduate study.

She earned a master's degree at the University of Alabama in 1983, with a master's thesis based on her field work in the basin of the River Maine in Ireland, and completed a PhD at the University of Kentucky in 1985, studying the karst landscape of the inner Bluegrass region of Kentucky.

After briefly working at a consulting firm, she joined the Bureau of Economic Geology at the University of Texas at Austin in 1987. Since 2004 she has also held an adjunct faculty position at the University of Nebraska–Lincoln.

== Recognition ==
Scanlon became a Fellow of the Geological Society of America in 2005, and a Fellow of the American Geophysical Union in 2015. She was elected a member of the National Academy of Engineering in 2016 "for contributions to the evaluation of groundwater recharge and aquifer depletion". The same year, she was awarded the M. King Hubbert Award by the National Ground Water Association. In 2023, Scanlon was elected as a Fellow of the American Association for the Advancement of Science.

Scanlon was the 2007 Birdsall–Dreiss Distinguished Lecturer of the Geological Society of America, which also gave her their 2019 O. E. Meinzer Award. The National Ground Water Association gave Scanlon their 2016 M. King Hubbert Award. The International Association of Hydrogeologists gave her their 2018 Presidents' Award.

Scanlon holds the William L. Fisher Endowed Chair in Geological Sciences.

== Selected publications ==
Scanlon's Meinzer Award citation selected the following four papers of Scanlon for particular attention, noting their high citations. It stated that the first two made Scanlon "the leading global expert on groundwater recharge", while the second two demonstrated her more recent interest in climate change and sustainability, and included pioneering work in the water resources used by hydraulic fracturing:

- Scanlon, Bridget R.; Healy, Richard W.; Cook, Peter G. (January 2002), "Choosing appropriate techniques for quantifying groundwater recharge", Hydrogeology Journal, 10 (1): 18–39, Bibcode:2002HydJ...10...18S, doi:10.1007/s10040-001-0176-2, S2CID 54188123
- Scanlon, Bridget R.; Keese, Kelley E.; Flint, Alan L.; Flint, Lorraine E.; Gaye, Cheikh B.; Edmunds, W. Michael; Simmers, Ian (2006), "Global synthesis of groundwater recharge in semiarid and arid regions", Hydrological Processes, 20 (15): 3335–3370, Bibcode:2006HyPr...20.3335S, doi:10.1002/hyp.6335, S2CID 6150880
- Scanlon, B. R.; Faunt, C. C.; Longuevergne, L.; Reedy, R. C.; Alley, W. M.; McGuire, V. L.; McMahon, P. B. (May 2012), "Groundwater depletion and sustainability of irrigation in the US High Plains and Central Valley", Proceedings of the National Academy of Sciences of the United States of America, 109 (24): 9320–9325, Bibcode:2012PNAS..109.9320S, doi:10.1073/pnas.1200311109, PMC 3386121, PMID 22645352
- Nicot, Jean-Philippe; Scanlon, Bridget R. (March 2012), "Water Use for Shale-Gas Production in Texas, U.S." (PDF), Environmental Science & Technology, 46 (6): 3580–3586, Bibcode:2012EnST...46.3580N, doi:10.1021/es204602t, PMID 22385152
