= Richard Hogg =

Richard Hogg may refer to:

- Richard Hogg, British artist, see Hohokum
- Richard Hogg (engineer) (born 1938), American engineer
- Richard M. Hogg (1944–2007), Scottish linguist
