= Majid Hassanizadeh =

Iranian scientist (born 1952)

Seyed Majid Hassanizadeh سید مجید حسنی‌زاده
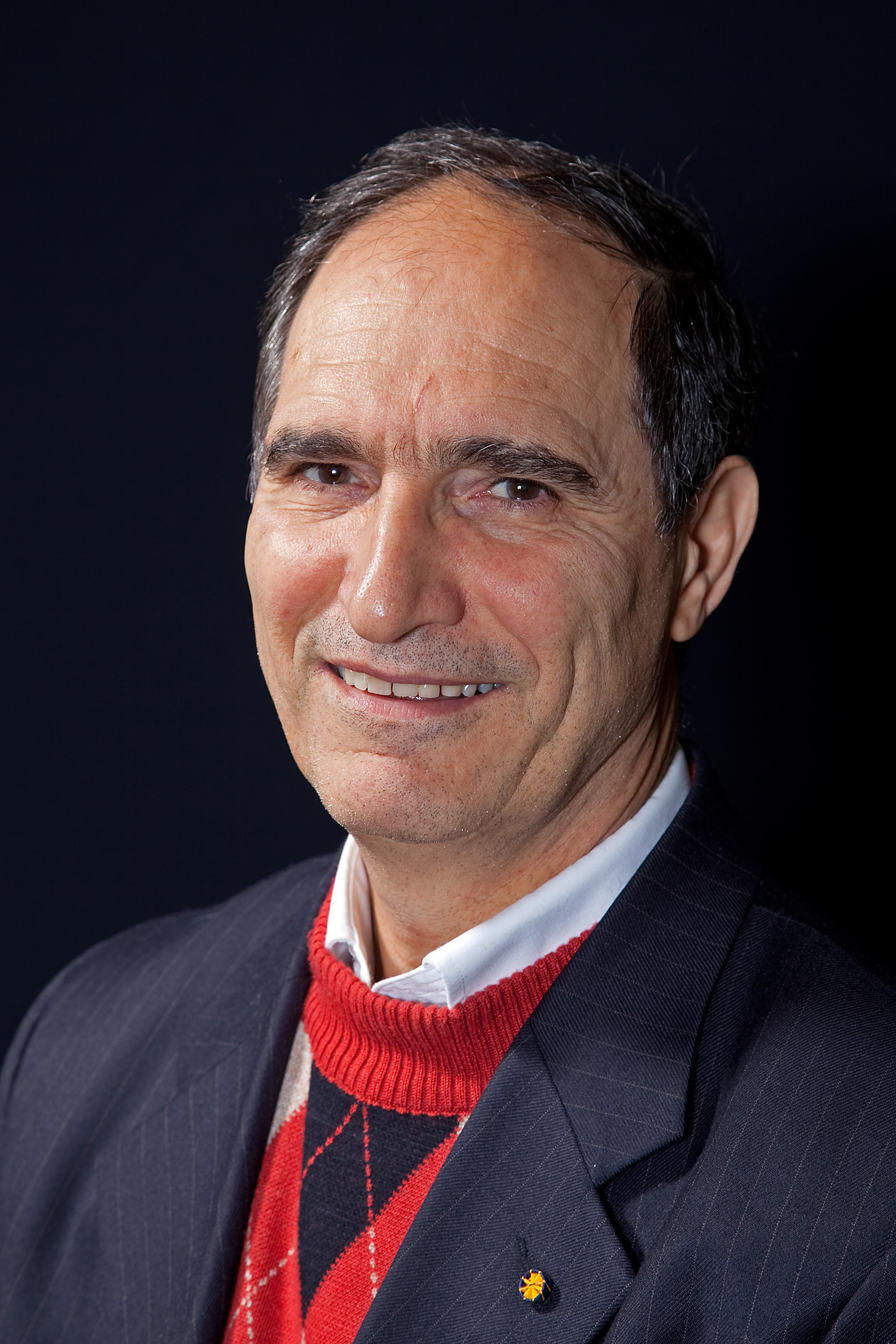
- Born: October 22, 1952 (age 73); Tooyserkan, Hamadan Province, Iran
- Education: Pahlavi University, Shiraz
- Awards: Humboldt Prize (2010)
- Scientific career
- Fields: Hydrogeology
- Workplaces: Utrecht University, TNO; TU Delft
- Doctoral advisor: William G. Gray
- Website: www.uu.nl/staff/SMHassanizadeh

Seyed Majid Hassanizadeh (Persian: سید مجید حسنی‌زاده; born 1952) is an Emeritus professor of hydrogeology at Utrecht University, where he headed the Hydrogeology group at the Faculty of Geosciences. until the end of 2018. His research focuses on flow of fluids and transport of solutes and colloids in porous media, through theory development, experimental studies, and modeling work. In particular, he focuses on two-phase flow, reactive transport in variably-saturated porous media, transport of micro-organisms, and biodegradation.

== Career ==
He has had a varied career:

- Abadan Institute of Technology (Iran, 1979–1982)
- Project Manager with Yekom Consulting Engineers (Iran, 1982–1984)
- senior researcher with the National Institute of Public Health and Environment, RIVM (Bilthoven, The Netherlands, 1984–1995)
- Associate Professor (1995–2001) and later Professor (2001–2003) with the Faculty of Civil Engineering and Geosciences, Delft University of Technology.
- He has held visiting faculty appointments at Notre Dame University, US, University of Bordeaux, France, the Swiss Federal Institute of Technology in Lausanne (EPFL), Switzerland, Stuttgart University, Germany, and King Abdullah University of Science and Technology (KAUST), Saudi Arabia.
- After retirement, he was appointed as Senior Professor at Center for Simulation Technology of Stuttgart University (2021-2025).
- He is VAJRA Adjoint Professor at Department of Civil Engineering, Indian University of Technology, Hyderabad, India, and Guest Professor at School of Resources and Environmental Science, Chongqing University, China.
- He co-founded of the International Society of Porous Media (InterPore); in 2008. InterPore is a non-profit-making independent scientific organization with the aims of advancing and disseminating knowledge for the understanding, description, and modeling of natural and industrial porous media systems. It has more than 2000 members. He has been the Managing Director of InterPore since its inception.
- He has contributed to more than 300 publications in journals, books, or as technical reports.
- Former Editor of Advances in Water Resources (1991–2001)
- Associate Editor of Vadose Zone Journal (2002–2008)
- Water Resources Research (2004–2010),
- Earth Energy Science. Member of International Advisory Board of Journal of Hydrologic Engineering (since 2004),
- On the editorial boards of Transport in Porous Media (since 1989), Advances in Water Resources (1988–2010), The Open Hydrology Journal (since 2007), Kuwait Journal of Science, Journal of Porous Media (since 2009), Special Topics & Reviews in Porous Media; An International Journal (since 2009), and Journal of Fluids (since 2013).

He is active as session organizer or member of various committees for the Royal Netherlands Academy of Arts and Sciences, NWO, American Geophysical Union, Soil Science Society of America, European Geosciences Union, International Society of Porous Media, and International Association of Hydrological Sciences. He has been leading and/or participating in a large number of projects funded by European Research Council, NWO, EU, TRIAS, SKB, TNO, BTS. He has supervised close to 100 graduate students and post-doctoral researchers; has (co-)organized more than 50 international conferences, workshops, and short courses; has been on the organizing or scientific committees of about 50 international conferences/workshops; has given invited lectures in more than 80 international meetings and short courses.

== Biography ==
Hassinizadeh was born in the city of Toyserkan in the west of Iran. His father was a teacher at a local school. When nine years old, his family moved to the city of Ilam in the Kurdish western part of Iran. Eight years later, they moved to the city of Karaj (near Tehran) where he finished his last year of high school. Throughout the secondary school, he was the first-ranking student. He went on to study civil engineering at Pahlavi University in Shiraz. He focused on optional courses dealing with water, "partly because of the poetic value of water in Iran", he has said.

After his graduation, he was offered a scholarship at Princeton University. During his studies at Princeton he became very active in the protests against the Shah regime in Iran. This earned him the nickname 'the phantom' during his fourth year because he was hardly seen at his desk, but left traces of study all the same.

After he obtained his PhD in 1979, he had the opportunity to stay and work in US. However, the Iranian Revolution had just started in Iran and, like 95% of the Iranian population, he supported Khomeini. So he decided to return to Iran. After about half a year, the new regime launched the so-called "cultural revolution", closed all universities, and encouraged all students and teachers to work in industry or agriculture.

While working at a consulting company on drainage and irrigation projects, Hassinizadeh learned about a post-graduate course in hydraulic engineering at IHE Institute in Delft, the Netherlands. He managed to obtain an exit visa through contacts of his employer and left for the Netherlands. After finishing the course, he was offered a research position at the Netherlands National Institute for Public Health and the Environment (RIVM). He and his wife had originally planned to return to Iran, but he was offered the chance to stay in science. Although torn, he decided to stay in the Netherlands.

== Education ==
- MSc & PhD, Civil Engineering, Princeton University, USA, 1979
- BSc, Civil Engineering, Pahlavi University, Iran, 1975

== Honors and awards ==
- He was elected Fellow of American Geophysical Union in 2002 and Fellow of American Association for the Advancement of Science in 2007.
- In 2019 he received the Robert E. Horton Medal from the American Geophysical Union for his outstanding contributions to the field of hydrology.
- He was awarded the honorary degree of Doktoringenieur from Stuttgart University in 2008.
- In 2010, he was awarded a Humboldt Prize.
- In May 2011, he was selected by the US National Ground Water Association as the Darcy Distinguished Lecturer for 2012.
- In the course of 2012, he gave around 80 lectures at 57 places around the world (see YouTube for the recordings of his lectures).)
- In June 2011, he was elected by the Soil Science Society of America to receive the Don and Bety Kirkham Soil Physics Award. In 2013, he was awarded a research grant of 2.24 Million Euro by the European Research Council.
- For his lifetime scientific achievements and his major role in founding and leading of the International Society for Porous Media, he was awarded the Royal medal of honor, knight in Order of the Netherlands Lion in July 2015.
- In 2019 he received the Robert E. Horton Medal from the American Geophysical Union for his outstanding contributions to the field of hydrology.

== Representative publications ==
- Joekar-Niasar, V.; Hassanizadeh, S.M.; Leijnse, A. (2008), "Insights into the relationships among capillary pressure, saturation, interfacial area and relative permeability using pore-scale network modelling", Transport in Porous Media, 74: 201–219, doi:10.1007/s11242-007-9191-7
- Bottero, S.; Hassanizadeh, S.M.; Kleingeld, P. (2011), "From local measurements to an upscaled capillary pressure-saturation curve", Transport in Porous Media, 87 (2): 271, Bibcode:2011TPMed..88..271B, doi:10.1007/s11242-011-9739-4
- Raoof, A.; Hassanizadeh, S.M.; Leijnse, A. (2010), "Upscaling transport of adsorbing solutes in porous media: pore-network modeling", Vadose Zone Journal, 9 (3): 624–636, Bibcode:2010VZJ.....9..624R, doi:10.2136/vzj2010.0026, S2CID 97578198
- Niessner, J.; Hassanizadeh, S.M. (2008), "A Model for Two-Phase Flow in Porous Media Including Fluid-Fluid Interfacial Area", Water Resources Research, 44 (8): W08439, Bibcode:2008WRR....4408439N, doi:10.1029/2007WR006721
- Torkzaban, S.; Hassanizadeh, S.M.; Schijven, J.F.; van den Berg, H.H.J.L (2006), "Role of Air–water interfaces on retention of viruses under unsaturated conditions", Water Resources Research, 42 (W12S14): W12S14, Bibcode:2006WRR....4212S14T, doi:10.1029/2006WR004904
- Oung, O.; Hassanizadeh, S.M.; Bezuijen, A. (2005), "Two-phase flow experiments in a geocentrifuge and the significance of dynamic capillary pressure effect", Journal of Porous Media, 8 (3): 247–257, doi:10.1615/JPorMedia.v8.i3.10
- Schijven, J.F.; Hassanizadeh, S.M. (2002), "Virus removal by soil passage at filed scale and groundwater protection of sandy aquifers", Water Science and Technology, 46 (3): 123–129, Bibcode:2002WSTec..46..123S, doi:10.2166/wst.2002.0069, PMID 12227597
- Hassanizadeh, S.M.; Celia, M.A.; Dahle, H.K. (2002), "Dynamic effects in the capillary pressure-saturation relationship and their impacts on unsaturated flow" (PDF), Vadose Zone Journal, 1: 38–57, doi:10.2113/1.1.38 (inactive 1 July 2025)
- Reggiani, P.; Hassanizadeh, S.M.; Sivapalan, M.; Gray, W.G. (1999), "A unifying framework for watershed thermodynamics: Derivation of constitutive equations", Advances in Water Resources, 23 (1): 15–39, Bibcode:1999AdWR...23...15R, doi:10.1016/S0309-1708(99)00005-6
