= M. King Hubbert Award =

The M. King Hubbert Award is an annual award granted by the National Ground Water Association in the United States. Established in 1973, it is named after Marion King Hubbert, an American geophysicist who made foundational contributions to geology and geophysics.

The award is presented to a person who has made a major science or engineering contribution to the groundwater industry through research, technical papers, teaching, and practical applications. As of 2026, fifty-three scientists have received the award.

== List of recipients ==
Starting in 1973, the list of recipients is available from the National Ground Water Association website.

- 1973: Walter H. F. Smith
- 1974: Robert Minning
- 1975: Harry E. LeGrand
- 1977: Thomas A. Prickett
- 1979: David M. Miller
- 1980: Stanley N. Davis
- 1981: Jack Keeley
- 1982: Wayne A. Pettyjohn
- 1983: Otto Helwig
- 1984: Don L. Warner
- 1985: John G. Ferris
- 1986: John D. Hem
- 1987: John A. Cherry
- 1988: Shlomo P. Neuman
- 1989: Leonard F. Konikow
- 1990: Jacob Bear
- 1991: John D. Bredehoeft
- 1992: Mary P. Anderson
- 1993: Irwin Remson
- 1994: Donald Nielsen
- 1995: William Back
- 1996: R. Allan Freeze
- 1997: Franklin W. Schwartz
- 1998: Richard R. Parizek
- 1999: Thomas C. Winter
- 2000: Emil A. Friend
- 2001: David McWhorter
- 2002: Warren W. Wood
- 2003: József Tóth
- 2004: Steven M. Gorelick
- 2005: Mary C. Hill
- 2006: Robert W. Gillham
- 2007: Edward A. Sudicky
- 2008: Charles Harvey
- 2009: John E. Doherty
- 2010: David Rudolph
- 2011: Craig M. Bethke
- 2012: Brian Berkowitz
- 2013: Chunmiao Zheng
- 2014: Fred Molz
- 2015: Sorab Panday
- 2016: Bridget R. Scanlon
- 2017: Eileen P. Poeter
- 2018: Beth L. Parker
- 2019: Bernard H. Kueper
- 2020: James J. Butler Jr.
- 2021: Otto D. L. Strack
- 2022: Peter Dillon
- 2023: Jimmy Jiao
- 2024: Stavros Papadopulos
- 2025: Marvin Glotfelty

== See also ==
- List of geology awards
- List of earth sciences awards
- Prizes named after people
