= Eugene S. Simpson =

American geologist

Eugene S. Simpson (1917–1995) was an American geologist who was a Fellow of the Geological Society of America, and founded and served as the chief editor of the Hydrogeology Journal.
