= Charles Harvey (scientist) =

American hydrologist at MIT

Charles Franklin Harvey
- Born: 1964 (age 61–62)

Academic background
- Education: Oberlin College (BA); Stanford University (MS, PhD)
- Thesis: Solute transport in spatially heterogeneous aquifers: Mapping large-scale structures and modeling small-scale effects (1996)
- Doctoral advisor: Steven M. Gorelick

Academic work
- Institutions: Massachusetts Institute of Technology
- Main interests: Hydrology; climate change; biogeochemistry; carbon storage

Charles Franklin Harvey (born c. 1964) is an American hydrologist and biogeochemist. He is a professor of Civil and Environmental Engineering at the Massachusetts Institute of Technology (MIT) and a member of the National Academy of Engineering.

== Early life and education ==
Harvey earned a Bachelor of Arts degree in mathematics from Oberlin College in 1986. He pursued a medical degree at the Ohio State University in 1987 for one year before pursuing a career as a hydrologist.

He returned to graduate school and attended Stanford University, where he earned a Master of Science degree in applied Earth Science and a doctorate in Geological and Environmental Sciences in 1996. He was advised by Steven M. Gorelick and wrote a dissertation on solute transport in aquifers.

== Career ==
Harvey joined the United States Geological Survey (USGS) as a hydrologist in 1987. He dropped out of his medical program and continued at the USGS in Menlo Park, California until 1990. After completing his doctorate at Stanford, he joined Harvard University in 1996 as the Gordon McKay Assistant Professor of Environmental Engineering. In 1998, he moved to MIT, where he became an associate professor in 2003 and full professor in 2011.

His research at MIT has contributed to understanding chemical transport and reactions in flowing groundwater. He has studied the interaction of groundwater with seawater in the United States and arsenic contamination of groundwater in Bangladesh and Vietnam. He has also studied hydrology and ecology of peat swamp forests in Borneo. He has testified at Congressional hearings and provided testimony for state bills regarding carbon sequestration, aquifer health, and climate change.

Notable past students include hydrogeologist Holly Michael, Kobold Metals CEO Kurt House, and Stanford University professor Alison Hoyt.

He was awarded the Freeman Lectureship by MIT and the Boston Society of Civil Engineers in 2003 and the Oliver Lectureship from the University of Texas at Austin in 2009. Harvey received the "Working-Class Hero" award from Miller-McCune Magazine and the science prize for online resources for education by the American Association for the Advancement of Science (AAAS) in 2010. He is a scientific advisor for Graphyte. He has written op-eds for the New York Times, Wall Street Journal, and the Bulletin of the Atomic Scientists. He holds patents for the characterization of subsurface carbon sequestration reservoirs using air injection and for an aquifer differential pressure sensor.

Harvey is a fellow of the American Geophysical Union and the Geological Society of America. In 2026, he was elected to the National Academy of Engineering.

== Awards ==
- Geological Society of America, Meinzer Award (2014)
- Prince Sultan bin Abdulaziz International Prize for Water (2012)
- National Ground Water Association, M. King Hubbert Award (2008)
- National Science Foundation CAREER Award (1999)
