= Mojdeh =

Mojdeh is a given name. Notable people with the name include:

- Mojdeh Bahar, American patent attorney and government official
- Mojdeh Delshad, American petroleum engineer
