= Brian Berkowitz =

Israeli hydrologist (born 1959)

- בריאן ברקוביץ
- Born: 3 February 1959 (age 67); Edmonton, Alberta, Canada
- Education: Technion – Israel Institute of Technology (PhD, 1986)
- Occupation: Hydrologist
- Employer: Weizmann Institute of Science
- Known for: Hydrological research on flow and transport phenomena in porous and fractured geological media; Biogeochemical applications for improving the treatment of kidney and urinary tract stones
- Awards: Meinzer Award (2015), John Dalton Medal (2021)

Brian Saul Berkowitz (Hebrew: בריאן ברקוביץ; born 3 February 1959) is an Israeli hydrologist, full professor at the Faculty of Chemistry, Weizmann Institute of Science. He served as Head of the Department of Chemical Research Support and as Head of the Department of Earth and Planetary sciences. His research focuses on flow and transport phenomena in porous media. He is the recipient of the Meinzer Award (2015) and the John Dalton Medal (2021).

== Biography ==
Brian Berkowitz was born and raised in Edmonton, Alberta, Canada, the son of Sheila Joyce (née Lipsett) and Prof. Norbert Berkowitz, and brother to Jonathan and Cheryl. His father, born in Berlin and sent as a child to Britain as part of the Kindertransport, was a Chemist, an energy researcher, and a member of the Order of Canada. His mother was a bacteriologist and an activist in special education and in Edmonton's Jewish community.

In 1976 he graduated from Strathcona High School in Edmonton, and immediately began his undergraduate studies in Applied mathematics at the University of Alberta. He completed this degree with honors in 1980 and continued toward a master's degree in applied mathematics and petroleum engineering at the same institution, which he completed in 1982. In that year he immigrated to Israel and began doctoral studies in hydrology at the Faculty of Civil and Environmental Engineering at the Technion. His doctoral thesis, supervised by Prof. Jacob Bear, was entitled "On continuum and discrete models for contaminant transport in fractured porous rock".

From 1986 to 1991 Berkowitz worked as a hydrologist at the Hydrological Service in Jerusalem. For the following two years he was a visiting professor at the University of British Columbia in Vancouver, and upon returning to Israel in 1993 he joined the Department of Environmental Sciences and Energy Research at the Weizmann Institute of Science as a senior scientist. In 1999 he was promoted to associate professor and in 2005 to full professor in the same department, which later became the Department of Earth and Planetary Sciences. Berkowitz chaired two departments in the Faculty of Chemistry: from 2004 to 2009 as Head of the Department of Chemical Research Support, and from 2010 to 2015 as Head of the Department of Earth and Planetary Sciences. During those years he also served as Head of the Sussman Institute for Environmental Sciences.

Over the years he has been a visiting professor at the Polytechnic University of Milan and at the CNRS in France. He has served on numerous European, American, and international committees and programs in his field of research, and in 2022 was appointed Director of the InterPore Academy of the International Society for Porous Media.

== Research ==
=== Anomalous (non-Fickian) chemical transport ===
His laboratory developed a theoretical framework for anomalous (non-Fickian) chemical transport as observed in heterogeneous porous media and fractured rock formations. This theory is continuously being extended, with matching numerical models and laboratory experiments, for broad application to fractured and heterogeneous media.

=== Quantification of transport in fractured and heterogeneous porous media ===
Berkowitz focuses on describing groundwater flow in natural aquifers characterized by fractures and structural heterogeneity. This motion involves multidimensional and variable velocity fields. One of the main challenges is providing a description of tracer and contaminant migration in such systems. His group applies the continuous-time random walk (CTRW) theory, which accounts for dispersion phenomena that do not conform to the classical Fickian model and cannot be solved by the advection–diffusion equation. The solutions derived from this framework are applicable to a wide range of transport and spreading scenarios.

=== Fractures and fracture networks ===
His research addresses geometric and hydraulic aspects of fracture networks. Berkowitz and his group develop theories to understand the geometric behavior of fracture structures and hydraulic conductivity as measured in natural rocks, changes in hydraulic properties of fractures undergoing deformation, and patterns of dissolution and mineral precipitation as observed in fractured geological formations.

=== Reactive transport and density-dependent phenomena ===
His group investigates reactive chemical transport processes as well as density-driven phenomena in heterogeneous porous and fractured media.

=== Soil and capillary zone processes ===
His laboratory examines the dynamics of flow and transport in soils and in the capillary zone – the transition between saturated and unsaturated regions.

=== Multiphase and immiscible fluids ===
His group conducts experimental and statistical-modeling studies to understand multiphase fluid flow (e.g., water and air) as well as immiscible fluids (such as DNAPLs – dense non-aqueous phase liquids) in heterogeneous media.

=== Catalytic methods for water purification ===
Berkowitz and his group develop catalytic methods, including the synthesis of new materials, to reduce the toxicity of persistent organic pollutants and heavy metals – through oxidation–reduction processes. In parallel, experiments are carried out to test the feasibility of introducing active materials into permeable barriers, as well as other groundwater purification applications.

=== Urology ===
Berkowitz applies insights from fluid mechanics and biogeochemistry to study the properties of kidney stones and the urinary tract, with the aim of improving clinical responses to various treatments. His research in this area is conducted in collaboration with Kaplan Medical Center.

== Awards and honors ==
- Landau Prize, awarded by Mifal HaPais (1997)
- Fellow of the American Geophysical Union (2005)
- Fellow of the Geological Society of America (2007)
- Inventor of the Year, Yeda Research and Development Company (2008)
- Oliver Distinguished Lecture in Hydrology, Jackson School of Geosciences, University of Texas at Austin (2011)
- M. King Hubbert Award, National Ground Water Association (2012)
- Meinzer Award, Geological Society of America (2015)
- Outstanding Editor Award, European Geosciences Union (2018)
- Member of the European Academy of Sciences and Arts (2019)
- Lifetime Achievement Medal, International Society for Porous Media (2021)
- John Dalton Medal, European Geosciences Union (2021)
- Award of the Israeli Urological Association for outstanding research in endourology (2022)
- American Chemical Society Award for a Perspective Article in Soil Science (2023)

== Personal life ==
Berkowitz is married to Melanie and is the father of three. He resides in Rehovot.
