= Nansen G. Saleri =

- Born: August 9, 1947 (age 79); Turkey
- Education: Robert Academy (1966)
- Alma mater: Boğaziçi University (then called Robert College, 1970); University of Virginia
- Occupation: Reservoir Engineer; Oil Executive
- Spouse: Marina Saleri
- Children: 2 daughters, 1 son
- Awards: SPE John Franklin Carll Award (2006)

Nansen G. Saleri (born 1947) is president and CEO of Quantum Reservoir Impact.He specializes in reservoir management and upstream technologies. As former head of Reservoir Management in Saudi Aramco, Saleri was principal driver behind Saudi Aramco's technological ascendancy in its upstream capabilities, specifically in the area of modern reservoir management, smart technologies, and maximum reservoir contact (MRC)/next-generation oil wells.

== Early life and education ==
Nansen G. Saleri was born in Turkey. He has a twin brother, Washington, D.C. psychiatrist Alen Salerian.

Saleri attended Robert Academy in Turkey from 1961 to 1966. Saleri holds a M.Sc. and a Ph.D. in chemical engineering from the University of Virginia and a B.Sc. from Boğaziçi University (then called Robert College), also in chemical engineering.

== Career ==
Saleri worked for Chevron (1974–1992) and served as Manager of Reservoir Engineering in Houston, Texas. He is author and principal instructor for Chevron's Reservoir Management training (1998–2002). He has been involved in world-wide projects (Gulf of Mexico, West Texas, Elk Hills, West Africa, Indonesia, and Papua New Guinea).

He joined Saudi Aramco as a Petroleum Engineer specialist in 1992. Saleri was chief architect of Saudi Aramco's successful reservoir management and water optimization programs, most notably for Ghawar, the world's largest field. Saleri oversaw the company's Maximum Sustained Capability (MSC) commitments at 10.8 million barrels per day and strategic planning for its oil and gas assets. He has assumed leadership role in numerous functions, including lead the Best-in-Class Strategic Imperative in Well Optimization, and established the Company's Reservoir Management Metrics and Chaired the corporate Gas Development Strategy Task Force. He directed reservoir development plans for several major projects, including Hawiyah and Haradh Gas Plants, Shaybah AXL, Haradh Increments II and III, Qatif/Abu-Safah, Nuayyim, AFK, Khurais, among others.

Saleri started his own company called Quantum Reservoir Impact (QRI). The company describes itself as a value creation agency designed to help oil companies maximize efficiencies in extracting oil from their reservoirs. They claim to do this through the use of cutting-edge technology and novel practices.

Saleri has authored numerous technical papers and has been a featured speaker at nearly 100 industry and ‘think-tank’ gatherings, including the Center for Strategic and International Studies (CSIS), Washington, D.C.; MIT; Paul H. Nitze School of Advanced International Studies (SAIS), Washington, D.C.; Stanford University; Texas A&M University; Cambridge Energy Research Associates (CERA); King Fahd University of Petroleum and Minerals; U.S. Department of Energy, Washington, D.C. and American Petroleum Institute, Washington, D.C.

Saleri and his brother Alen J. Salerian published papers in the non-peer reviewed Medical Hypotheses in 2005, 2007 and 2008.

He is a Member of the Advisory Board of Petroleum Engineering at the University of Houston and has been a Society of Petroleum Engineers (SPE) Distinguished Lecturer and Journal of Petroleum Technology (JPT) Distinguished Author; Co-Chairman of the SPE European Forum; Keynote Speaker at the Fifth, Sixth and Eighth International Forums on Reservoir Simulation (1994, 2001 and 2005); SPE Speakers Bureau Member (1994–1997); Member of SPE Fluid Mechanics Committee (1996 to 1998).

Saleri founded the Kristin Saleri Art Foundation, named after his mother, in 2011.

=== Society of Petroleum Engineers (SPE) Journal Entries ===
- Dr. Nansen G. Saleri (& others), Shaybah-220: A Maximum-Reservoir-Contact (MRC) Well and Its Implications for Developing Tight-Facies Reservoirs Volume 7, Number 4 August 2004 SPE 88986-PA
- Dr. Nansen G. Saleri (& others), The Expanding Role of the Drill Bit in Shaping the Subsurface Volume 55, Number 12 December 2003 SPE 84923-MS
- Dr. Nansen G. Saleri, “Learning” Reservoirs: Adapting to Disruptive Technologies Volume 54, Number 3 March 2002 SPE 73695-MS
- Dr. Nansen G. Saleri, Reengineering Simulation: A Bottom-Line Approach to Managing Complexity and Complexification 1996 SPE 36696-MS
- Dr. Nansen G. Saleri, Reservoir Performance Forecasting: Acceleration by Parallel Planning 1993 SPE 25151-PA

=== Honors and awards ===
He received the 2006 SPE John Franklin Carll Award, given annually by the Society of Petroleum Engineers (SPE), for his outstanding contributions to modern reservoir management.

== Personal life ==
Nansen and his wife Marina live in Texas.
