= Gary Pope =

Gary A. Pope currently holds the Texaco Centennial Chair in Petroleum Engineering at the University of Texas at Austin. He holds a B.Sc. from Oklahoma State University and a Ph.D. from Rice University, both in chemical engineering. He has previously worked at Shell for more than 7 years and has graduated more than 110 graduate students. He is noted for research in reservoir engineering, reservoir simulation, enhanced oil recovery, phase behaviour and fluid properties. He was elected a member of the National Academy of Engineering in 1999 for contributions to understanding multiphase flow and transport in porous media, and applications of these principles to improved oil recovery and aquifer remediation. He has received numerous awards, among them the SPE John Franklin Carll Award in 2002 and the SPE Anthony F. Lucas Gold Medal in 2004. Notable students include Mojdeh Delshad, Akhil Datta-Gupta, and Bang Vishal.
