= Vijay K. Gupta =

Vijay K. Gupta was a Professor of Civil Engineering specializing in hydrology until his death in March 2022. He is known for his advancements in hydrometeorology and geomorphology, as well as leading the Hydro-Kansas Research Project.

== Education ==
Starting in 1968 Gupta studied statistical hydrology, focusing on statistical applications, under Vujica M. Yevjevich at Colorado State University. During this time, he would focus his studies on rainfall, however three years later he moved his studies to the University of Arizona where he shifted his focus to subsurface hydrology. During this time, he collaborated with Rabi Bhattacharya and Gary Sposito on multiscale dispersion in aquifers.

In 1973 he gained his Ph.D. after his extended studies on hydrology, mathematics, and statistical applications of geophysics.

== Career ==
At the University of Mississippi, Gupta was a research collaborator and developed mathematical applications in hydrology. There he collaborated with Ed Waymire on space-time rainfall variability across multiple scales.

In 1989 joined the University of Colorado Boulder (CU) as a Professor of Civil Engineering. During his time at CU, he became a fellow at the Cooperative Institute for Research in Environmental Sciences (CIRES) and in 2012 he became a Professor Emeritus. Before he stopped working at the university in 2016, he made many contributions, including developing theories on scaling in hydrology, leading research on hydraulic processes from molecular to planetary scales, conducted research on regional flood statistics from a geophysical understanding, and advanced the understanding of peak flow and flow-duration curve (FDC) in rivers. During his time with the university, he also modernized the undergraduate and graduate hydrology curricula.

Gupta provided many contributions to science over his 50 plus year career. These contributions include his use of nonlinear geophysical approaches in hydrology and his studies of multiscale phenomena in watershed hydrology. His research in scaling specifically took up most of his focus, this included his studies on space-time scaling of rainfall fields, FDC in floods and droughts, and hydraulic geometry and evaporation scaling. Additionally, Gupta pioneered the use of the Whitewater Basin in Kansas as a natural laboratory when he established the Hydro-Kansas Research Project.

== Personal life ==
Gupta had many influences for his career and the focus of his studies. He stated that much of this influence was from his parents, as his father was a hydraulics research engineer, and his mother loved mathematics. His career was supported by his wife Indira.

Vijay K. Gupta died in March 2022, with the AGU Fall Meeting of that year featuring a session honoring his work by focusing on floods, fractals, and scaling research.

== Awards and organizations ==
- AGU Fellow (1990) - Gained for his contributions to hydrology research.
- Robert E. Horton Medal (2008) - Awarded for his influence and achievements in scientific hydrology, more specifically his studies in rainfall’s effects on basin topography and using that information to better predict floods.
- Water, Earth, Biota (WEB) - Key figure in its launch.
- International Association of Hydraulic Sciences (IAHS) decade in Prediction in Ungauged Basins (PUB) - Co-Initiate.
