= Roland N. Horne =

Academic (energy engineering)

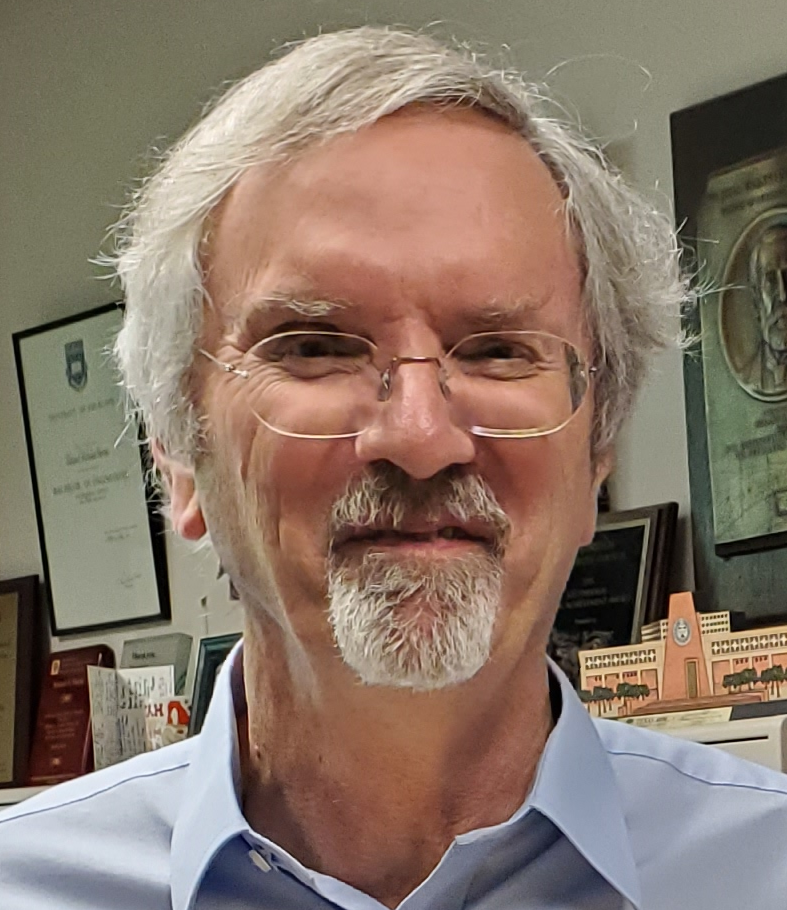
- Born: 1952 (age 73–74); London, England
- Occupations: Energy engineer, author and academic

Academic background
- Education: BE, Engineering Science (1972); Ph.D., Engineering Science (1975); D.Sc., Engineering (1986)
- Alma mater: University of Auckland (New Zealand)
- Thesis: Transient effects in geothermal convective systems (1975)

Academic work
- Institutions: Stanford University

Roland N. Horne is an energy engineer, author and academic. He is the Thomas Davies Barrow Professor of Earth Sciences, a Senior Fellow at the Precourt Institute for Energy, and Director of the Geothermal Program at Stanford University.

Horne is most known for his contributions to well test interpretation, production optimization, and the tracer analysis of fractured geothermal reservoirs. Among his authored works are peer-reviewed publications and the books Modern Well Test Analysis and Discrete Fracture Network Modeling of Hydraulic Stimulation, the latter of which he co-authored. He has been a Society of Petroleum Engineers (SPE) Distinguished Lecturer in 1998, 2009, and 2020, and has received the SPE Distinguished Achievement Award for Petroleum Engineering Faculty, the Lester C. Uren Award, as well as the John Franklin Carll Award. Additionally, he has served on the International Geothermal Association (IGA) Board from 1998 to 2001, 2001 to 2004, and 2007 to 2010, and was the IGA President from 2010 to 2013. He also served as Technical Program Chair for the World Geothermal Congress in Turkey in 2005, Bali in 2010, Melbourne in 2015, and Iceland in 2020.

Horne was elected to the U.S. National Academy of Engineering (NAE) in 2002, named an Honorary Member of the SPE in 2007, and awarded the titles of Fellow at the School of Engineering, University of Tokyo, and Honorary Professor at China University of Petroleum – East China in 2016.

== Education ==
Horne received a Bachelor of Engineering and a Doctor of Philosophy in Engineering Science in 1972 and 1975, respectively, and a Doctor of Science (D.Sc.) in Engineering in 1986, all from the University of Auckland (UoA).

== Career ==
Horne served as an Acting Assistant Professor of Chemical Engineering and then Petroleum Engineering at Stanford University between 1976 and 1978. He then joined the University of Auckland as a lecturer in Theoretical and Applied Mechanics for a year in 1978–1979 before being appointed assistant professor of Petroleum Engineering at Stanford in 1980. He was promoted to associate professor in 1984 and served as Professor from 1990 to 2006, while also holding the position of Chairman of Petroleum Engineering from 1995 to 2006. In 2006, he assumed the role of Professor of Energy Resources Engineering, and in 2022, he became Professor of Energy Science and Engineering. He was named the Thomas Davies Barrow Professor of Earth Sciences in 2008.

== Research ==
Horne's research focuses on matching models to reservoir responses through inverse problems that infer unknown reservoir parameters instead of measuring them directly, addressing typical issues such as tracer analysis of fractures, computer-aided well test analysis, production schedule optimization, and automated history matching/decline analysis. In particular, he works on geothermal reservoir engineering and the flow of fluids through porous materials and fractures.

== Works ==
Horne authored Modern Well Test Analysis in 1995, which provided a tutorial on well test interpretation using computerized tools and included a companion website with data examples, a searchable version of the book, and a software program for practical learning. His next book, Discrete Fracture Network Modeling of Hydraulic Stimulation, co-authored with Mark W. McClure, detailed a model integrating fluid flow, deformation, friction weakening, and permeability evolution in complex fracture networks. This work, published in 2013, explored hydraulic stimulation in low matrix permeability settings and demonstrated how fracture deformation stresses influenced propagation and network formation.

=== Reservoir engineering ===
Horne's work has led to numerous research papers—early in his career, he received Best Paper awards from the Journal of Petroleum Technology (1992) and the SPE Formation Evaluation (1993). His 1992 study showed that multivariate optimization provides superior solutions compared to traditional methods by analyzing all variables simultaneously. In 1993, he advanced well-test analysis with a new Laplace space application, improving parameter identification and flow rate deconvolution from noisy data while maintaining familiar pressure function behavior. Additionally, he presented the sequential predictive probability method, a Bayesian approach for improved quantitative discrimination between reservoir models in well-test analysis. Within his work on reservoir development and design optimization, a hybrid Genetic Algorithm (HGA) was used to optimize the layout of 33 new wells in an oil field project, resulting in a 6% increase in project profit by enhancing well distribution and platform location. His research further introduced a nonlinear parameter estimation method for permeability and porosity in heterogeneous reservoirs by integrating well testing, production history, seismic data, and geological correlations, demonstrating that combined data is more valuable than isolated data. In 2004, he also created a utility-theory-based methodology for well placement under uncertainty, incorporating numerical simulation, a hybrid genetic algorithm, and a cost-effective approach with random reservoir realizations.

Since 2010, Horne's work has considered the use of machine learning and data analytics in reservoir analysis, leading to the improvement of parameter estimation from permanent downhole gauges and other noisy measurements.

=== Enhanced geothermal systems and fracture modeling ===
Horne has made contributions to geothermal energy, enhanced geothermal systems (EGS), and fracture modeling. He, along with McClure, received the 2011 SEG Best Paper in "Geophysics" Award for their paper describing a numerical investigation of induced seismicity caused by injecting water into a single isolated fracture in fractured, low-permeability rock, which triggered slip on preexisting large-scale fracture zones. Furthermore, he found that in EGS projects, new fractures often formed away from the wellbore and propagated through natural fractures, with shear stimulation being more likely in areas with thick faults, as supported by simulation results and field experiences.

In 2022, Horne co-advised a study on the microbiological community in the subsurface, which demonstrated how the deep population of microbes could be used to characterize geological events.

== Awards and honors ==
- 1982 – Distinguished Achievement Award for Petroleum Engineering Faculty, SPE
- 2000 – Distinguished Member, SPE
- 2000 – Lester C. Uren Award, SPE
- 2002 – Member, NAE
- 2005 – John Franklin Carll Award, SPE
- 2006 – Henry J. Ramey Jr., Geothermal Reservoir Engineering Award, Geothermal Resources Council
- 2011 – Patricius Medal, German Geothermal Society
- 2015 – Geothermal Special Achievement Award, Geothermal Resources Council
- 2016 – Honorary Professor, China University of Petroleum – East China
- 2016 – Fellow, School of Engineering, University of Tokyo
- 2023 – Core Values Award, Women in Geothermal (WING)

== Bibliography ==
=== Books ===
- Modern Well Test Analysis: A Computer-aided Approach (1995) ISBN 9780962699214
- Discrete Fracture Network Modeling of Hydraulic Stimulation: Coupling Flow and Geomechanics (2013) ISBN 9783319003832

=== Selected articles ===
- Güyagüler, B., & Horne, R. N. (2004). Uncertainty assessment of well-placement optimization. SPE Reservoir Evaluation & Engineering, 7(01), 24–32.
- McClure, M. W., & Horne, R. N. (2011). Investigation of injection-induced seismicity using a coupled fluid flow and rate/state friction model. Geophysics, 76(6), WC181-WC198.
- Tian, C., & Horne, R. N. (2019). Applying machine-learning techniques to interpret flow-rate, pressure, and temperature data from permanent downhole gauges. SPE Reservoir Evaluation & Engineering, 22(02), 386–401.
- Zhang, Y., Horne, R. N., Hawkins, A. J., Primo, J. C., Gorbatenko, O., & Dekas, A. E. (2022). Geological activity shapes the microbiome in deep-subsurface aquifers by advection. Proceedings of the National Academy of Sciences, 119(25), e2113985119.
- Aljubran, M. J., & Horne, R. N. (2024). Power supply characterization of baseload and flexible enhanced geothermal systems. Scientific reports, 14(1), 17619.
