= Iraj Ershaghi =

Iranian-American academic

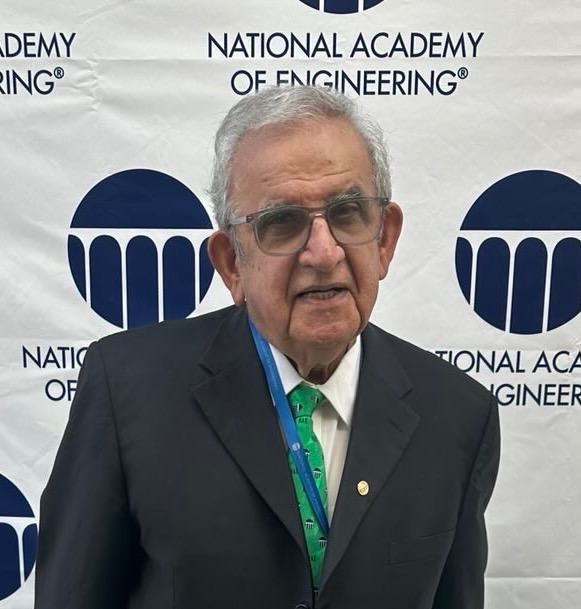
- Dr. Iraj Ershaghi in 2025
- Occupations: Petroleum engineer, researcher, and academic
- Awards: Member of the National Academy of Engineering (2014); Honorary Member, American Institute of Mining, Metallurgical, and Petroleum Engineers; Honorary Member, Society of Petroleum Engineers; SPE John Franklin Carll Award (2010); Colonel Edwin L. Drake Oilman Award (2022)

Academic background
- Education: University of Tehran (B.S., Petroleum Engineering, 1965); University of Southern California (M.S., Petroleum Engineering, 1968); University of Southern California (Ph.D., Petroleum Engineering, 1972)

Academic work
- Discipline: Petroleum engineer
- Institutions: University of Southern California
- Main interests: Reservoir characterization, digital oilfield technology

Iraj Ershaghi is an Iranian-American petroleum engineer and academic who serves as the Omar B. Milligan Professor of Petroleum Engineering at the University of Southern California (USC). His research focuses on reservoir characterization, fractured reservoir systems, digital and smart oilfield technologies, and low-carbon energy transition strategies.

Ershaghi was elected to the National Academy of Engineering in 2014 "for contributions to the characterization of complex fractured reservoirs and for leadership in university-industry collaboration." He has received industry honors including the American Institute of Mining, Metallurgical, and Petroleum Engineers (AIME)'s Honorary Membership, and the SPE John Franklin Carll Award.

== Early life and education ==
Ershaghi was born in Iran. He received a bachelor’s degree in petroleum engineering from the University of Tehran in 1965, and later earned both his master's (1968) and Ph.D. (1972) in petroleum engineering from the University of Southern California.

== Career ==
In the early part of his career, Ershaghi worked as an engineer in the Bahregansar oil field in Iran. He also worked for AGIP-SIRIP, Signal Oil and Gas Company, and the California State Lands Commission prior to joining the University of Southern California (USC) faculty in 1972.

Ershaghi holds the Omar B. Milligan chair in Petroleum Engineering at USC and directs the university's Petroleum Engineering program. He also serves as executive director of the Ershaghi Center for Energy Transition (E-CET), as well as the Center for Interactive Smart Oilfield Technologies (CiSoft), which in 2008 was described as "the university's biggest industry partnership." His research spans low-carbon engineering, greenhouse gas monitoring, complex reservoir well-testing, pattern recognition for waterflood and EOR monitoring, reservoir characterization, unconventional resources, and soft-computing approaches to digital oilfield design.

In 2020, Ershaghi argued that repurposed idle wells could provide "subsurface energy storage" and reduce the environmental and economic costs of abandonment.

In April 2022, USC launched the Ershaghi Center on Energy Transition (E-CET), named in his honor and supported by a gift from his former student Gary Buntmann and his wife. The center focuses on advancing technologies for lowering the carbon footprint of oil and gas development and for converting idle wells into subsurface energy and geothermal storage sites.

In 2024, USC Viterbi created the Ershaghi Faculty Mentorship Award, which recognizes a faculty member for outstanding mentoring of undergraduate and master’s students.

Ershaghi has served as the western region director of the Petroleum Technology Transfer Council and, in 2010, was elected to the board of directors of the Research Partnership to Secure Energy for America (RPSEA). He has worked with industry and with the state of California on the regulation of offshore wells. His analysis was featured in outlets such as BBC News, NBC News, and the Los Angeles Times during coverage of the Deepwater Horizon spill.

== Awards and recognitions ==
In 2012, Ershaghi received Honorary Membership in the American Institute of Mining, Metallurgical, and Petroleum Engineers for more than four decades of contributions to the advancement of reservoir characterization and the evaluation of hydrocarbon and geothermal reservoirs.

Ershaghi has been awarded Honorary Membership in the Society of Petroleum Engineers (SPE). His awards and recognitions from the organization include the Distinguished Achievement Award for Petroleum Engineering Faculty (1983), Distinguished Member Award (1996), Western North America Distinguished Service Award (2005), Technology Transfer Award (2006), North America Western Region Reservoir Description and Dynamics Award (2007), Distinguished Lecturer (2006–2007), John Franklin Carll Award (2010), and Legion of Honor (2016). In 2022, he was awarded the U.S. Colonel Edwin L. Drake Oilman Award by the Petroleum History Institute.

In 2014, Ershaghi was elected to the National Academy of Engineering for "contributions to characterization of complex fractured reservoirs, and for leadership in university-industry collaboration."

== Bibliography ==
- Ershaghi, Iraj (2023). Solved Problems in Well Testing. Springer. ISBN 978-3031472992.

== Selected publications ==
- Ershaghi, I., & Omorigie, O. (1978). "A method for extrapolation of cut vs recovery curves." Journal of Petroleum Technology, 30(2), 203–204.
- Ucok, H., Ershaghi, I., & Olhoeft, G. R. (1980). "Electrical resistivity of geothermal brines." Journal of Petroleum Technology, 32(4), 717–727.
- Abdassah, D., & Ershaghi, I. (1986). "Triple-porosity systems for representing naturally fractured reservoirs." SPE Formation Evaluation, 1(2), 113–127.
- Acuna, J. A., Ershaghi, I., & Yortsos, Y. C. (1995). "Practical application of fractal pressure-transient analysis in naturally fractured reservoirs." SPE Formation Evaluation, 10(3), 173–179.
- Al-Ghamdi, A., & Ershaghi, I. (1996). "Pressure transient analysis of dually fractured reservoirs." SPE Journal, 1(1), 93–100.
- Ershaghi, Iraj (2019). "17 - Ethical Issues Facing Engineers in Oil and Gas Operations". In Ali E. Abbas (ed.). Ethical Issues Facing Engineers in Oil and Gas Operations. Cambridge University Press. pp. 245–257. doi:10.1017/9781108616188.017.
