= Robert E. Horton Medal =

Award given by American Geophysical Union

The Robert E. Horton Medal is given out by the American Geophysical Union to recognize "outstanding contributions to the geophysical aspects of hydrology". The award was created in 1974 and named after Robert E. Horton to honor his contributions to the study of the hydrologic cycle. It was awarded biennially until 1995 and then annually thereafter.

== Past recipients ==
Source: American Geophysical Union

- 1976 Walter B. Langbein
- 1978 Harold A. Thomas Jr.
- 1980 William C. Ackermann
- 1982 John R. Philip
- 1984 Charles V. Theis
- 1986 Abel Wolman
- 1988 Peter S. Eagleson
- 1990 Paul A. Witherspoon
- 1992 Luna B. Leopold
- 1994 Mikhail Budyko
- 1995 Don Kirkham
- 1996 Mark Meier
- 1997 John D. Bredehoeft
- 1998 Ignacio Rodriguez-Iturbe
- 1999 Wilfried H. Brutsaert
- 2000 M. Gordon Wolman
- 2001 Donald R. Nielsen
- 2002 Jean-Yves Parlange
- 2003 Shlomo P. Neuman
- 2004 Garrison Sposito
- 2005 Gedeon Dagan
- 2006 Thomas Schmugge
- 2007 Rafael L. Bras
- 2008 Vijay K. Gupta
- 2009 William E. Dietrich
- 2010 Jacob Bear
- 2011 M. Sivapalan
- 2012 Keith Beven
- 2013 Soroosh Sorooshian
- 2014 W. James Shuttleworth
- 2015 Günter Blöschl
- 2016 Thomas Dunne
- 2017 Eric F. Wood
- 2018 Dennis P. Lettenmaier
- 2019 S. Majid Hassanizadeh
- 2020 Martinus Theodorus van Genuchten
- 2021 Diane M. McKnight
- 2022 Efi Foufoula-Georgiou
- 2023 Andrea Rinaldo
- 2024 Chris Milly

== See also ==
- List of geophysicists
- List of geophysics awards
- List of prizes named after people
