= Mary Jo Baedecker =

American geochemist

MaryJo Baedecker (born 1941) is an American geochemist. She was named a fellow of the American Geophysical Union in 2011.

== Early life ==
In 1941, Baedecker was born in Richmond, Kentucky.

== Education ==
Baedecker received a BSc in chemistry from Vanderbilt University, a MSc in chemistry from the University of Kentucky and a PhD in geochemistry from George Washington University.

== Career ==
From 1968 to 1973, she was a research scientist at the University of California, Los Angeles, In 1974, she joined the United States Geological Survey (USGS) as a research chemist. Her research focused on the contamination of aquifers by landfill sites. Her research paper on the subject in the journal Groundwater was designated a benchmark in its field by the International Association of Hydrological Sciences. Baedecker played a crucial role in establishing the Toxic Substances Hydrology Program at USGS. She became the chief scientist for hydrology at USGS and leader of the USGS' National Research Program. She retired from the USGS in 2004 but continues to work as a scientist emeritus there.

In 2002, she received Distinguished Service Awards from the American Department of the Interior and from the Geological Society of America. In 2010, she received the Meinzer Award.
