= Mahdi S. Hantush =

Iraqi-born American hydrologist

Dr. Mahdi S. Hantush
- Born: 1921; Iraq
- Died: 1984 (aged 62–63)
- Citizenship: Iraqi - American
- Education: American University of Beirut; UC Berkeley (MSc); University of Utah (PhD)
- Known for: Well hydraulics
- Spouse: Iqbal Hantush
- Awards: O.E. Meinzer Award

Dr. Mahdi S. Hantush (1921–1984) was a prominent Iraqi-born American hydrologist known for his analytical work on leaky aquifers and well hydraulics. He was the founder of the New Mexico Tech Hydrology Program.

== Academic ==
Dr. Mahdi Hantush earned his first degree as a Civil Engineer from American University of Beirut. He then moved to the United States, where he obtained an MSc. in Irrigation Engineering at UC Berkeley in 1947. He followed this up with a doctorate in civil engineering at the University of Utah under C.E. Jacob. In 1954, Hantush received a call to the New Mexico Institute of Mining and Technology where he developed one of the first graduate programs in groundwater hydrology. He headed the New Mexico Tech Hydrology Program for over a decade, during which time it attracted students from all over the world.

== Professional ==
As a civil engineer, Hantush began his professional career as an irrigation engineer in Iraq. This work provided him with practical experience and an appreciation for the problems involved in the development and management of water resources.

== Family ==
His granddaughter is Yasmin Younis, the 2018 Student Commencement Speaker at Boston University’s 185th Commencement, which went viral all over the Middle East. His son, Mohamed Hantush, is a Civil Engineer for the Environmental Protection Agency and resides in Cincinnati, Ohio.

== Honors and awards ==
- O.E. Meinzer Award, 1968
- New Mexico Tech has honored his memory by creating the "Mahdi Hantush Memorial Fellowship"

== See also ==
- Well test
- New Mexico Tech
- Meinzer Award
