= Thomas Schmugge =

Thomas J. Schmugge is an American physicist and hydrologist.

Schmugge graduated from the University of California, Berkeley in 1965 with a doctorate in physics, and joined the faculty of Trinity College in Connecticut as an assistant professor of physics. From 1970 to 1986, he worked for Goddard Space Flight Center's Hydrological Sciences Branch. Schmugge was subsequently employed by the Agricultural Research Service until 2004. After leaving the federal government, Schmugge was the Gerald Thomas Chair for Sustainable Agriculture at New Mexico State University from 2005 to 2008. He was elected a fellow of the American Geophysical Union, and received the AGU's Robert E. Horton Medal in 2006. He was affiliated with the IEEE's Geoscience and Remote Sensing Society, proposed for fellowship in 2001, and subsequently elevated to life fellow in 2011.

== Selected publications ==
- Schmugge, Thomas J.; Andre, Jean-Claude, eds. (1991). Land Surface Evaporation: Measurement and Parametrization. Springer-Verlag. ISBN 9781461277699.
- Kohnle, Anton; Gonglewski, John D.; Schmugge, Thomas J. (2002). Kohnle, Anton; Gonglewski, John D.; Schmugge, Thomas J. (eds.). Optics in Atmospheric Propagation and Adaptive Systems IV. Vol. 4538. Bibcode:2002SPIE.4538.....K. ISBN 9780819442635.
