= Donald I. Siegel =

American hydrogeologist (born 1947)

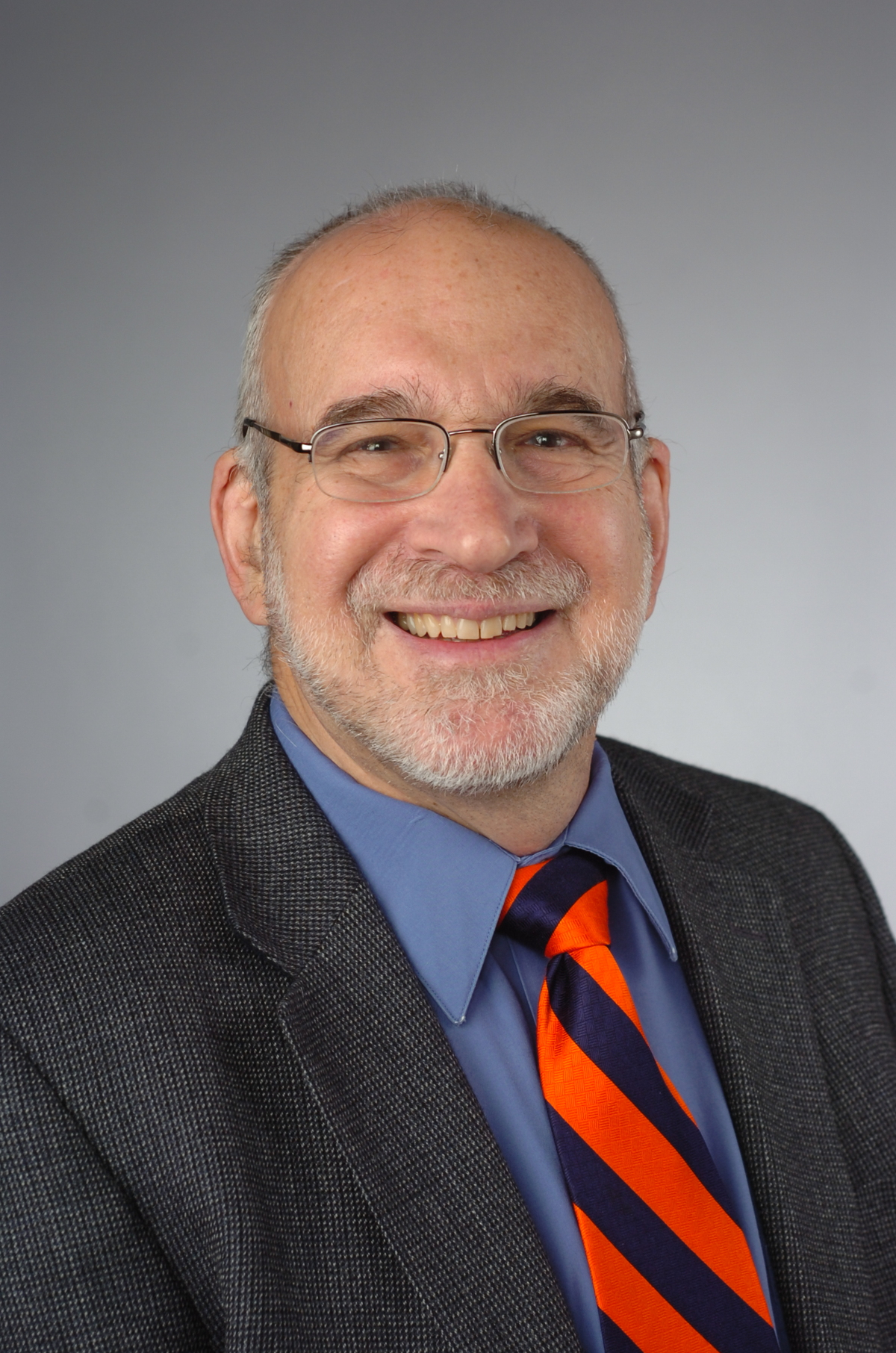
- Donald I. Siegel in 2014
- Born: October 24, 1947; New York City
- Citizenship: American
- Education: University of Minnesota; Pennsylvania State University; University of Rhode Island
- Awards: Meinzer Award (2005); Fellow of the AAAS (2012); Fellow of the AGU (2013); Marcus Milling Legendary Geoscientist Medal (2022)
- Scientific career
- Workplaces: Syracuse University
- Thesis: Hydrogeochemistry and kinetics of silicate weathering in a gabbroic watershed, Filson Creek, Northeastern Minnesota (1981)
- Doctoral advisor: Hans-Olaf Pfannkuch
- Website: thecollege.syr.edu/people/faculty/siegel-donald-i/

Donald Ira Siegel (born October 24, 1947) is the emeritus Laura J. and L. Douglas Meredith Professor in the department of Earth Science at Syracuse University. He served as the president of the Geological Society of America from July 2019 until June 2020. Siegel is known for his work in wetland geochemistry and hydrogeology.

== Education ==
Siegel earned his Bachelors in Geology at University of Rhode Island in 1969. He earned his MS at Penn State and PhD in Hydrogeology at University of Minnesota. His 1981 PhD thesis was titled "Hydrogeochemistry and kinetics of silicate weathering in a gabbroic watershed, Filson Creek, Northeastern Minnesota".

== Career ==
Siegel began his career at Amerada Hess Corporation in 1971 as an exploration geologist, conducting geological studies to locate oil and gas in the Rocky Mountains and southwestern United States.

He moved to the United States Geological Survey in 1976 as a district hydrogeologist in the Minnesota District.

In 1982, he became an assistant professor at the College of Arts and Sciences at Syracuse University, becoming a full professor in 1992. Siegel was appointed department chair in 2013 and worked at Syracuse until his retirement in 2017. He was also the Jessie Page Heroy Professor and a Meredith Professor of Teaching Excellence (2009).

== Research ==
While working as a USGS hydrologist, after making his early observations on deep groundwater deposits, Siegel discovered that groundwater flow regulates the diversity of habitats in the mires, world's largest wetlands. He also studied interaction of oil-spill organic matter with minerals in affected aquifers, interaction of this groundwater with wetlands, and the westernmost edge where acid rain was being deposited by coal-fired power plants.

After joining the faculty at Syracuse, Siegel studied of how groundwater and deep saline waters passed through the Marcellus Shale millions of years ago to the present. Siegel's wetland research evolved into an examination of how groundwater flow and water quality influences greenhouse gas emissions in vast peat lands in northern Canada, Siberia, and northern Minnesota. His early study of groundwater contamination resulted in the closure of Staten Island's Fresh Kills Landfill.

Siegel also investigated the use of similar forensic techniques to characterize fluids generated by hydraulic fracking and other unconventional gas and oil extraction in western China, Pennsylvania, Ohio, and New York State.

Siegel has said that hydrofracking benefits in New York state outweigh the environmental risks, calling it a safe process.

=== Chesapeake Energy Funding Controversy ===
In 2015, Siegel was involved in a conflict-of-interest controversy. In a peer reviewed paper, Siegel came to a conclusion that natural-gas production using fracking wells had not contaminated groundwater in Pennsylvania and that methane in drinking water was unrelated to fracking.

After media reports that Siegel did not disclose that Chesapeake Energy, a hydrocarbon exploration company, had paid him to analyze the data, the journal Environmental Science & Technology, which published the analysis, posted a correction.

While fracking proponents praised the study, many environmental groups ethical violations and cited smaller sample size that had produced conflicting results. Despite Siegel's admission of private funding, he received intense backlash. Critics demanded that he be fired or retire from Syracuse University, and that an ethics investigation be launched by both SU and the journal. The university later found that Siegel was in compliance with University's internal disclosure policies. In 2015, Siegel was called to testify before the Committee on Science, Space, and Technology in Washington, D.C.

== Awards ==
The Hydrogeology Division of the Geological Society of America selected Siegel as the 1993 Birdsall Distinguished Lecturer in Hydrogeology. He was elected and served as the 1995 Chairman of the Hydrogeology Division of the GSA. He is a recipient of the Geological Society of American’s Distinguished Service Award.

In 2005, Siegel received the Meinzer Award for Research by the Hydrogeology Division of the Geological Society of America.

In 2010, Siegel was appointed chair of the Water Sciences & Technology Board for a three year term. In 2012, Siegel was elected member of the American Association for the Advancement of Science for "his distinguished service and pioneering contributions on the hydrogeology and biogeochemistry of wetlands and contaminant transport". He was elected a fellow of the American Geophysical Union in 2013.

Siegel served as the president of the Geological Society of America from July 2019 until June 2020.

In 2022, he was awarded the Marcus Milling Legendary Geoscientist Medal by the American Geosciences Institute.

== Personal life ==
Siegel was born on October 24, 1947, into a Jewish family in New York City. He lives in Syracuse with his wife Bette Siegel.

In 2005, he wrote a cookbook titled "From Lokshen to Lo Mein: The Jewish Love Affair With Chinese Food" (Gefen, ISBN 9789652293572).
