= Lynn Gelhar =

American civil engineer

Lynn Walter Gelhar (born 1936) is an American civil engineer focusing in hydrology and is currently professor emeritus at Massachusetts Institute of Technology. He is recognized for pioneering research in stochastic subsurface hydrology, has leading research in the area of field-scale contaminant transport experiments, and has extensive experience on the hydrologic aspects of nuclear waste disposal.

== Background ==
Gelhar was born in 1936 in the central Wisconsin sand country (A Sand County Almanac) . He grew up in the small agricultural village of Oakfield, Wisconsin located at the foot of the Niagara Escarpment, graduating from Oakfield High School in 1954. He studied Civil Engineering at the University of Wisconsin, specializing at the graduate level in hydrology and fluid mechanics, with minors in mathematics and meteorology; his doctorate was completed in 1964. During his graduate study he also worked with the Soil Conservation Service(USDA) on design of water control structures and at Fairbanks-Morse & Co. on large pumping systems for flood control and water supply projects.

In 1964 he joined the faculty of the Department of Civil Engineering at the Massachusetts Institute of Technology (MIT) as an assistant professor, and was promoted to associate professor in 1969. In 1973 he joined the faculty of the Geoscience Department at the New Mexico Institute of Mining and Technology (NMT); as Professor of Hydrology he coordinated of the graduate program in hydrology. In 1983 he returned to MIT as full professor, and retired in 1996, becoming professor emeritus while continuing to direct graduate student research. Sabbatical leaves included visits at Stanford University (1971), Karlsruhe Institute of Technology (1978), Ecole des Mines de Paris (1978), Royal Institute of Technology (KTH, Stockholm) (1986), Swiss Federal Institute of Technology in Zurich (1986), University of Western Australia and the Commonwealth Scientific and Industrial Research Organization (Perth) (1987), Lawrence Berkeley Laboratory (1993) and King Abdulaziz University (KAU), Jeddah, (2012).

== Research ==
Gelhar is recognized as a leading authority on stochastic subsurface hydrology. In 1982 he received the American Geophysical Union's Horton Award in recognition of his pioneering work in stochastic subsurface hydrology, in 1983 was elected a Fellow in the American Geophysical Union, cited particularly for work in stochastic methods, and in 1987 he was the recipient of the O. E. Meinzer Award by the Geological Society of America for three papers dealing with stochastic methods. He is the author of the textbook Stochastic Subsurface Hydrology(1993), and has authored 160 technical publications. He has broad experience in fundamental and applied water-related research, but is best known for his theoretical work describing contaminant transport in naturally heterogenous aquifers using stochastic methods. He has also been instrumental in developing large-scale long-term field experiments designed to evaluate the new theoretical results, including field sites on Cape Cod, near Columbus, Mississippi, and a vadose zone site in the New Mexico desert near Las Cruces. His review of worldwide data on field-scale dispersion in aquifers is frequently cited in applied investigations aquifer contamination. His publications are widely cited, as reflected by his inclusion in the 2001 ISI Highly Cited list of scientists in Engineering and in Ecology/Environment. In Google Scholar he is credited with more than 16,000 citations, being the most highly cited individual in the field of Groundwater Hydrology.

== Professional activities ==
Gelhar has experience in public service and consulting with government and industry on aspects of groundwater hydrology, dealing particularly with hazardous and nuclear waste issues. He has served on several multidisciplinary review teams, including groups reviewing environmental aspects of the Hanford Site in Washington, and the WIPP nuclear waste disposal site in New Mexico. At the WIPP site regional groundwater conditions may make the site susceptible to localized salt dissolution and associated features like breccia pipes and sinkholes, which could compromise the long-term stability of the site. Such uncertainties are intertwined with the complex politics of WIPP. For the nuclear weapons test site in Nevada, he chaired a panel reviewing groundwater modeling for that region of southwestern Nevada as part of an assessment of groundwater contamination effects from underground weapons testing. At the Hanford site in Washington he was involved in hydrologic aspects of the high-level nuclear waste facility that was proposed in the basalt and was a member of a panel reviewing science and technology of Hanford environmental cleanup. At Hanford there is a unique threat to the long-term stability of waste disposal facilities associated with the potential for mega floods with water hundreds of meters deep sweeping over the site, as has happened repeatedly as recently as 13,000 years ago (Missoula Floods). He was a member of a review group that assessed the groundwater conditions at the proposed Yucca Mountain nuclear waste disposal site and has contributed a chapter to a book exploring uncertainties associated with Yucca Mountain. While on sabbatical leaves in France, Switzerland and Sweden he worked with scientists involved in the radioactive waste disposal programs in those countries, in Sweden preparing a report on flow and transport in fractured rocks for their agency dealing with radioactive waste disposal.

== Honors and awards ==
- Charles V. Theis Award, “…outstanding contributions in ground-water hydrology.”
- American Institute of Hydrology, 2017
- Distinguished Service Citation “…internationally recognized research and instructional program in water resources, groundwater hydrology…”
- University of Wisconsin, College of Engineering, 1999
- O. E. Meinzer Award “…distinguished contributions in hydrogeology…three papers dealing with stochastic methods”
- Geological Society of America, 1987
- AGU Fellow “…contributions to the science of groundwater hydrology and particularly for his application of stochastic methods in that field.”
- American Geophysical Union, 1983
- Robert E. Horton Award “In recognition of his pioneering work in stochastic subsurface hydrology”
- American Geophysical Union, 1982
