= William W. Woessner =

American hydrogeologist

- Education: University of Wisconsin-Madison (PhD), University of Florida (MS), College of Wooster (BA)
- Awards: O.E. Meinzer Award (2020)
- Scientific career
- Fields: Hydrogeology
- Workplaces: University of Montana, Desert Research Institute (University of Nevada)

William W. Woessner is an American hydrogeologist and Regents Professor Emeritus of Hydrogeology at the University of Montana. He is a recipient of Meinzer Award (2020) for his works on the "hyporheic zone, virus transport, and the occurrence/transport of pharmaceutical chemicals in groundwater."
