= József Tóth (hydrogeologist) =

Hungarian hydrogeologist (1933–2026)

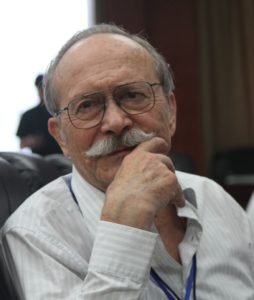
- Born: June 22, 1933; Békés, Hungary
- Died: July 3, 2026 (aged 93); Edmonton, Alberta, Canada
- Occupations: Hydrogeologist; academic

József Tóth (June 22, 1933 – July 3, 2026) was a Hungarian-born hydrogeologist and academic who was Professor Emeritus of the University of Alberta in Canada, and Honorary Professor at the Eötvös Loránd University in Budapest, Hungary.

== Background ==
József Tóth was born in Békés, Hungary on June 22, 1933. In 1952, he was admitted to the University of Sopron as a student of geophysics. He took part in the Hungarian Revolution of 1956, after the fall of which he fled to Austria and then the Netherlands. He resumed his studies at Utrecht University, and in 1960 emigrated to the Canadian province of Alberta with his wife and two children. In 1965, he received his doctorate in Utrecht. He died on July 3, 2026, at the age of 93.

== Career ==
Although he was employed as a geophysicist at the Research Council of Alberta, he soon had to work as a groundwater consultant in Hydrogeology. Working from M.K. Hubbert's 1940 paper "The theory of ground-water motion", Tóth solved the Laplace equation for a "unit basin" geometry. Superposing a sinusoidal constant head surface on the unit basin "resulted in the concept of composite flow patterns", referred to as "hierarchically nested flow systems." His theory of regional groundwater flow is discussed in most hydrogeology textbooks, such as Fetter, Hornberger et al., Deming, and Freeze and Cherry's Groundwater, the cover of which prominently featured his regional flow diagram. He rose to be the Head of the Groundwater Department at the Research Council. He also taught hydrogeology courses at the University of Alberta and University of Calgary and was a full professor at the University of Alberta (Rostron, Benjamin J, p. 205-206 in Deming, 2002.

Among his more than a hundred publications of international influence based on his theory, several of his studies cover special fields, such as: underground storage of highly radioactive waste; formation and improvement of saline soils; hydrocarbon and uranium ore exploration; soil and rock mechanics; and formation of wetlands.

== Awards and recognitions ==
- Meinzer Award – Hydrogeology Division of the Geological Society of America (1965)
- President's Award – International Association of Hydrogeologists (1999)
- M. King Hubbert Award – National Groundwater Association (2003)
- Theis Award – American Institute of Hydrology (2004)
- Magyar Érdemrend középkereszt polgári tagozata állami kitüntetés (2013)
- External Member Hungarian Academy of Sciences (2016)

== Significant works ==
Author(s)	Publication Date	Title
Tóth József	1962	A theory of groundwater motion in small drainage basins in Central Alberta, Canada
Tóth József	1963	Reply (To S. N. Davis's discussion of Tóth's: A theory of groundwater motion in small drainage basins in Central Alberta, Canada)
Tóth József	1963	A theoretical analysis of groundwater flow in small drainage basins
Tóth József	1966	Groundwater Geology, Movement, Chemistry, and Resources near Olds, Alberta
Tóth József	1966	Hozzászólás dr. Szebényi Lajos “Az artézi víz forgalmának mennyiségi meghatározósa” cimű tanulmányához
Tóth József	1970	A Conceptual Model of the Groundwater Regime and the Hydrogeologic Environment
Tóth József	1970	Relation between electric analogue patterns of groundwater flow and accumulation of hydrocarbons
Tóth József	1971	Groundwater Discharge: A Common Generator of Diverse Geologic and Morphologic Phenomena
Tóth József	1973	Hydrogeology and Field Evaluation of a Municipal Well Field, Alberta, Canada
Tóth József	1978	Gravity – induced cross-formational flow of formation fluids, Red Earth Region, Alberta, Canada
Tóth József	1978	Gravity – induced cross-formational water-flow – possible mechanism for transport and accumulation of petroleum
Tóth József	1980	Cross-Formational Gravity-Flow of Groundwater: A Mechanism of the Transport and Accumulation of Petroleum (The Generalized Hydraulic Theory of Petroleum Migration)
Tóth J., Millar R. F.	1983	Possible effects of erosional changes of the topography relief on pore pressures at depth
Tóth J., Skippen G. B.	1983	The nuclear fuel waste management program. A report to the Canadian Geoscience Council
Tóth József	1984	The Modern Scope of Hydrogeology
Tóth J., Millar R. F.	1985	Reply (to comment by C.E. Neuzil on Possible effects of erosional changes of the topography relief on pore pressures at depth)
Tóth József	1987	Petroleum Hydrogeology: A Potential Application of Groundwater Science
Tóth J., Corbet T.	1987	Post-Paleocene Evolution of Regional Groundwater Flow Systems and their Relation to petroleum accumulations, Taber Area, Southern Alberta, Canada
Tóth J., Gillard D.	1988	Experimental design and evaluation of a peatland drainage system for forestry by optimization of synthetic hydrographs
Tóth J., Rakhit K.	1988	Exploration for reservoir quality rock bodies by mapping and simulation of potentiometric surface anomalies
Tóth, J., Ophori D. U.	1989	Characterization of Ground-Water Flow by Field Mapping and Numerical Simulation, Ross Creek Basin, Alberta, Canada
Tóth, J., Ophori D. U.	1989	Patterns of Ground-Water Chemistry, Ross Creek Basin, Alberta, Canada
Tóth, J., Ophori D. U.	1990	Influence of the location of production wells in unconfined groundwater basins: an analysis by numerical simulation
Tóth, J., Ophori D. U.	1990	Relationships in regional groundwater discharge to streams: An analysis by numerical simulation
Tóth J., Maccagno Md., Otto C. J., Roston B. J.	1991	Generation and migration of petroleum from abnormally pressured fluid compartments – discussion
Tóth J., Rostron B. J.	1992	Numerical Simulation Of Oil/Oily-Contaminant Migration And Entrapment In A Lenticular Reservoir
Tóth J., Otto C. J.	1993	Hydrogeology and oil deposits at Pechelbronn-Soultz-Upper Rhine Graben
Tóth J., Parks K. P.	1995	Field Evidence for Erosion-Induced Underpressuring in Upper Cretaceous and Tertiary Strata, West Central Alberta, Canada
Tóth József	1995	Hydraulic Continuity In Large Sedimentary Basins
Tóth József	1996	Reply to “Comment” by Mazor E.
Tóth József	1996	Reply to “Comment on Tóth József, 1995, Hydraulic Continuity in Large Sedimentary Basins” by A.C.M. Laing
Tóth József	1996	Thoughts of a hydrogeologist on vertical migration and near surface geochemical exploration for petroleum
Tóth J., Rostron B.J.	1996	Ascending fluid plumes above devonian pinnacle reefs: Numerical modeling and field example from West-Central Alberta, Canada
Tóth J., Holysh S.	1996	Flow of formation waters: Likely cause for poor definition of soil gas anomalies over oil fields in East-Central Alberta, Canada
Tóth J., Sheng G.	1996	Enhancing Safety Of Nuclear Waste Disposal By Exploiting Regional Groundwater Flow: The Recharge Area Concept
Tóth József	1999	Review: “Groundwater in Geologic Processes” by Steven E. Ingebritsen and Ward E. Sanford
Tóth József	2000	Groundwater as a geologic agent: An overview of the causes, processes, and manifestations
Tóth József	2000	Summary of the sessions on critical evaluation of scientific, technical and social demand for ITGE geological mapping
L. Rybach, J. Tóth	2000	International Satellite Conference “The Geology of Today for Tomorrow”. A Satellite Conference of the World Conference on Science, 1999 June 21–22, Budapest, Hungary
G. Sheng, J. Tóth	2000	Using the recharge area concept as a strategy for siting underground nuclear waste repositories
Tóth József	2000	Report on Section B: “Protection of Subsurface Aquifers” – GTT Conference. A Satellite Conference of the World Conference on Science, 1999 June 21–22, Budapest, Hungary
Tóth József	2000	The key to improvements in aquifer protection: Analytical hydrogeology
Tóth J., Almasi I.	2001	Interpretation of observed fluid potential patterns in a deep sedimentary basin under tectonic compression: Hungarian Great Plain, Pannonian Basin
Tóth József	2002	József Tóth: An Autobiographical Sketch
Tóth József	2003	Fluid-potential patterns and hydrocarbon deposits in groundwater flow-fields induced by gravity and tectonic compression, Hungarian Great Plain, Pannonian Basin
Tóth József	2003	Önéletrajzi vázlat
Pethő S., Mádlné Szőnyi J., Tóth J.	2004	A Kisalföldi-medence regionális felszín alatti gravitációs vízáramlási képe a hidraulikai adatfeldolgozás alapján
Mádlné Szőnyi J., Simon Sz., Tóth J., Pogácsás Gy.	2005	Felszíni és felszín alatti vizek kapcsolata a Duna-Tisza közi Kelemen-szék és Kolon-tó esetében
Tóth József	2005	The Canadian School of Hydrogeology: History and Legacy
Tóth József	2006	Átfogó kép az Alföld felszín alatti vízáramlás-rendszereinek jellegzetes tulajdonságairól
Tóth J., Mádl-Szőnyi J.	2007	“A Duna-Tisza Köze Vízföldtani Típusszelvény” és a Szikesedés Összefüggései
Czauner B., Tóth J., Mádl-Szőnyi J., Pogácsás Gy.	2008	Hidraulic potential anomaly indicating thermal water reservoir and gas pool near Berekfürdő, Trans-Tisza Region, Hungary
Tóth J., Mádl-Szőnyi J.	2008	Soil and wetland salinization in the framework of the Danube–Tisza Interfluve hydrogeologic type section
Tóth J., Mádl-Szőnyi J.	2009	A hydrogeological type section for the Duna-Tisza Interfluve, Hungary
Tóth J., Hayashi M.	2010	The theory of basinal gravity flow of groundwater and its impacts on hydrogeology in Japan
Tóth József	2015	Geothermal phenomena in the context of gravity-driven basinal flow of groundwater
Xing Gong, József Tóth, Xueqiang Yang, Bingxiang Yuan & Deluan Feng	2018	A numerical model in predicting the initial karst development in porous limestone

== Sources ==
- Tóth József publication list, Tóth József és Erzsébet Hidrogeológia Professzúra honlapján a Virtuális könyvtárban
- Tóth József publication list
