= Joseph F. Poland (hydrologist) =

American hydrologist

Joseph Fairfield Poland (1908–1991) was the founding expert in the hydrogeologic field of land subsidence. He committed 50 years of his life to understanding and bringing awareness to the issue. Land subsidence results from over pumping groundwater that leads to compaction of unconsolidated aquifer systems and is the leading cause of land subsidence. He pioneered invaluable research on the subject throughout his career at United States Geological Survey (USGS).

== Biography ==
=== Education and early career ===
Joseph Poland was born in Boston in 1908. He received a geology degree from Harvard University in 1929. After graduating he worked as a petroleum geologist until 1931 in Columbia for Tropical Oil Company. In the same year, he returned to the United States to earn his master's degree in geology from Stanford University in 1935. From 1931 to 1939 he worked consulting work on ground water and geophysical problems.

=== USGS career ===
He began working for USGS in 1940. In 1949 he served as the district geologist. He headed the project to delineate and calculate the storage capacity of California's aquifer systems. This work was essential to the creation of the California Water Plan. In 1956 he led a survey to investigate aquifer mechanics and the causes of land subsidence in Sacramento, California. He directed the survey until his retirement in 1974 He continued working as a rehired annuitant until 1984.

=== Awards and international acclaim ===
His innovative research earned him awards and international recognition of his expertise. He received the Claire P. Holdredge Award of the Association of Engineering Geologists and the O. E. Meinzer Award of the Hydrogeology Division of the Geological Society of America. He founded the Hydrology division of the society.

Organizations such as the UN, FAO, World Bank, and UNESCO consulted with him; UNESCO, United Nations Educational, Scientific and Cultural Organization, called upon him to address the subsidence issue in Italy. As a result of his work in Venice, Italy he is regarded him as the "savior of Venice" for revealing the reason the city was sinking. Additionally he was called upon as an expert witness for land subsidence that occurred in Wilmington Oil Field in California. The case was brought by the U.S. Navy and the City of Long Beach against the company for the damages caused by the land subsidence. Through his understanding of subsidence, he was able to save millions of dollars by redesigning major infrastructure construction plans to avoid areas with sinking lands thus preventing major damage.

Lifelong dedication earned him the title "Mr. Land Subsidence." He spent his career inspiring colleagues and students while generating awareness to the field. His life's work continues to be referenced and expanded upon. Shortly following his death, the 4th international symposium on land subsidence was dedicated to him.

=== Telephone pole photo ===
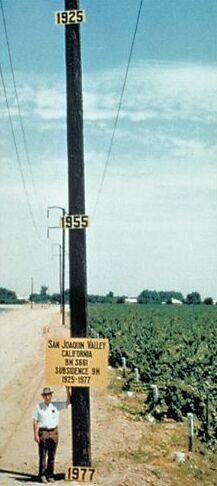
Joseph F. Poland standing next to a power pole showing how high the land was in earlier years

Poland received notoriety by effectively illustrating the effects of land subsidence that began in 1920 in the San Joaquin Valley. Land elevation loss from excessive ground water pumping is memorialized in the telephone pole photo taken in the San Joaquin Valley. The yellow sign he is holding reads, "San Joaquin Valley California BMS661 Subsidence 9M 1925-1977." This photo shows 28 feet of lost surface level altitude over a 52-year period. Markers are placed to show the previous ground level altitudes for the years 1925, 1955, and 1975. The utility pole pictured is located is southwest of Mendota on the western side of the San Joaquin valley, east of I-5, on Panoche Avenue.

=== Land subsidence ===
Land subsidence is a global issue and has different causes. Some are natural, like earthquakes, and some are caused by humans. In the United States, land subsidence from over pumping has affected 45 states and accounts for changes in over 17,000 square miles of land which is an area almost 10 times the size of Glacier National Park in Montana. The process of compaction is reversible to a point. Water acts as a filler in the space between soil particles. As the water is depleted the soil is compacted from the water loss. In places like the telephone pole photo the process has passed the point of no return. The amount of compaction is measured with extensometers which are deep wells, ranging from 500 to 3,000 feet. Extensometers record the contraction and expansion of soils at specific depths at regular intervals.

== Influence on hydrologic and geologic research ==
Poland died on June 4, 1991, of Parkinson's disease in Sacramento, California. Two weeks after his death the fourth International Symposium on Land Subsidence was held and dedicated to him. Additionally, a book of collective research titled Land Subsidence Case Studies and Current Research; Proceedings of the Dr. Joseph F. Poland Symposium on Land Subsidence was published following the symposium. "This unusual volume serves to inform both the layman as well as geological and engineering specialists of the causes for and innovative techniques to avoid or mitigate subsidence in action." His work measuring subsidence continues to be built upon today by USGS.

According to University of Nevada Reno, subsidence has also been correlated with the rise of the Sierra Nevada mountain range and increased seismic activity of the San Andreas Fault.
