= Mary P. Anderson =

Professor of hydrogeology

Mary Frances Pikul Anderson
- Born: September 30, 1948 (age 78); Buffalo, New York
- Education: Stanford University
- Scientific career
- Thesis: Numerical studies of linked soil-moisture and groundwater systems (1973)

Mary Pikul Anderson is a hydrologist, geologist, and professor emerita of hydrogeology. She is a fellow of the Geological Society of America, the American Geophysical Union, and the National Academy of Engineering.

== Early life and education ==
Anderson was born September 30, 1948, in Buffalo, New York. She received a B.A. degree in geology at the State University of New York at Buffalo in 1970. She earned an M.S. in geology in 1971 and a PhD in hydrology in 1973 from Stanford University. After a brief time at Southampton College of Long Island University, she joined the faculty of the University of Wisconsin–Madison in 1975 where she was promoted to professor in 1985.

Anderson was elected as a member into the National Academy of Engineering in 2006 for leadership in the development of groundwater-flow models. Anderson also served as president of the Hydrology Section of the American Geophysical Union from 1996 until 1998, and was the Editor-in-Chief of the journal Groundwater from 2002 until 2005.

== Research ==
Anderson's research involves groundwater–lake interaction and application of computer models.

She is co-author of two textbooks including Introduction to Groundwater Modeling and Applied Groundwater Modeling, now in a 2nd edition (2015). She has been cited as turning groundwater modeling into a "fundamental tool of practicing hydrologists."

=== Selected publications ===
- Anderson, Mary P.; Cherry, John A. (1979-11-01). "Using models to simulate the movement of contaminants through groundwater flow systems". C R C Critical Reviews in Environmental Control. 9 (2): 97–156. Bibcode:1979CREC....9...97A. doi:10.1080/10643387909381669. ISSN 0007-8999.
- Anderson, Mary P.; Cherry, John A. (1979-11-01). "Using models to simulate the movement of contaminants through groundwater flow systems". C R C Critical Reviews in Environmental Control. 9 (2): 97–156. Bibcode:1979CREC....9...97A. doi:10.1080/10643387909381669. ISSN 0007-8999.
- ANDERSON, MARY P. (1989-04-01). "Hydrogeologic facies models to delineate large-scale spatial trends in glacial and glaciofluvial sediments". GSA Bulletin. 101 (4): 501–511. Bibcode:1989GSAB..101..501A. doi:10.1130/0016-7606(1989)101<0501:HFMTDL>2.3.CO;2. ISSN 0016-7606.

== Awards and honors ==
- M. King Hubbert Award, National Ground Water Association (1992)
- O.E. Meinzer Award, Geological Society of America (1998)
- Fellow, Geological Society of America
- Fellow, American Geophysical Union (1999)
- C.V. Theis Award, American Institute of Hydrology (2000)
- Elected member, National Academy of Engineering (2006)
- Walter Langbein lecture, American Geophysical Union (2007)
