= List of members of the National Academy of Engineering =

This is an index of lists of members and international members of the United States National Academy of Engineering, organized by the academy's 12 disciplinary sections. The linked section lists give each person's name, primary institution, and election year. The lists are intended to include both living and deceased members; for deceased members, the year of death is noted.

Aerospace
See List of members of the National Academy of Engineering (aerospace)
Bioengineering
See List of members of the National Academy of Engineering (bioengineering)
Chemical
See List of members of the National Academy of Engineering (chemical)
Civil and Environmental Engineering
See List of members of the National Academy of Engineering (civil)
Computer Science and Engineering
See List of members of the National Academy of Engineering (computer science)
Electric Power/Energy Systems
See List of members of the National Academy of Engineering (electric power and energy systems)
Electronics, Communication and Information Systems
See List of members of the National Academy of Engineering (electronics)
Manufacturing, Services and Human Systems
See List of members of the National Academy of Engineering (manufacturing, services and human systems)
Materials
See List of members of the National Academy of Engineering (materials)
Mechanical
See List of members of the National Academy of Engineering (mechanical)
Natural Resources Engineering
See List of members of the National Academy of Engineering (natural resources)
Special fields and interdisciplinary
See List of members of the National Academy of Engineering (special fields and interdisciplinary)
