= Holly Michael =

American hydrogeologist

Holly Anne Michael
- Born: 1976 (age 49–50)

Academic background
- Education: University of Notre Dame (BS); Massachusetts Institute of Technology (MS, PhD)
- Thesis: Seasonal dynamics in costal aquifers : investigation of submarine groundwater discharge through field measurements and numerical models (2005)
- Doctoral advisor: Charles Harvey
- Website: ceoe.udel.edu/hmichael

Holly Anne Michael (born 1976) is an American hydrogeologist and Associate Professor of geology at the University of Delaware's College of Earth, Ocean, and Environment.

== Early life and education ==
Holly earned her BS in Civil Engineering at the University of Notre Dame in 1998 and her Ph.D. in Hydrology at the Massachusetts Institute of Technology in 2005. Michael performed her graduate research at MIT on seasonal groundwater exchange in coastal zones in Massachusetts with her Ph.D. advisor Charles F. Harvey.

== Career and research ==
Holly Michael is an associate professor of geology at the University of Delaware. Her research focuses on coastal hydrogeology, groundwater-surface water interactions, and water resource management, and is often aimed at better understanding how groundwater flows and solute levels affect ecosystem and human health.

Prior to serving as an associate professor at the University of Delaware in 2008, Michael performed research at Stanford University and with the US Geologic Survey.

Michael's academic work has had a significant impact on the discipline of hydrogeology. Her research on groundwater contamination by arsenic in the Bengal Basin has implications for the 70 million people who rely on the Bengal Basin for drinking water. Additionally, her work investigating the impacts of climate change on coastal aquifers in Bangladesh is relevant to the 40 million people who rely on those coastal ecosystems to live and work. Michael has also performed research on strategies to effectively manage and store monsoonal flow in the Ganges Basin, which has implications for flood management and water security. Her work has been published by a number of notable publications including Nature and Science. She currently leads the hydrogeology group in the department of Geologic Sciences at the University of Delaware.

In 2012, Holly Michael received the National Science Foundation Faculty Early Career Development Award. This grant funded her research on groundwater-seawater interactions, focusing on the issues of groundwater salinization, sediment ripples, and tides.

== Awards and honors ==
- Geological Society of America James B. Thompson, Jr. International's Distinguished Lectureship, 2018
- Unidel Fraser Russell Career Development Chair in the Environment, University of Delaware
- NSF Faculty Early Career Development Award, 2012.
- Oak Ridge Associated Universities Ralph E. Powe Junior Faculty Award, 2010

== Publications ==
Michael's work has been published in scientific journals such as Nature and Science. Michael has 50 publications as of 2019.
