= Garrison Sposito =

Garrison Sposito is an American hydrologist. He received a Robert E. Horton Medal in 2004.
