= John D. Bredehoeft =

American groundwater geologist (1933–2023)

John Dallas Bredehoeft (February 28, 1933 – January 1, 2023) was an American geologist and groundwater scientist who worked for 32 years at the U.S. Geological Survey (USGS) before founding his own consulting group in the 1990s. The National Ground Water Association called Bredehoeft a "giant" in the field of groundwater studies.

Born in St. Louis, Missouri, on February 28, 1933, Bredehoeft attended Kirkwood High School before studying at Princeton University, from which he received a B.S. degree in geological engineering in 1955. He then attended the University of Illinois Urbana-Champaign, where he was advised by George Burke Maxey and received M.S. (1957) and Ph.D. (1962) degrees in geology; his thesis was entitled The Hydrogeology of the Lower Humboldt River Basin, Nevada.

After completing his doctorate, Bredehoeft joined the U.S. Geological Survey's water research program. His 1973 publication with George F. Pinder, "Mass transport in flowing groundwater", received the 1975 O.E. Meinzer Award from the Hydrogeology Division, Geological Society of America, and was upon his death still considered a pioneering publication in contaminant transport. From 1974 to 1979, he served as the head of the program, and from 1980 to 1985 served as the regional hydrologist for the Western United States. With Bredehoeft as administrator, the USGS' hydrologic research program increased its relevance and visibility. During his tenure at the Geological Survey, Bredehoeft chose to retain the title of research geologist rather than hydrologist, in emphasis of his research area's impact on the whole of geology. He was elected to the National Academy of Engineering in 1994. Following his retirement in 1995, he formed the Hydrodynamics Group, a consulting firm in groundwater science.

Following the retirement of Jay Lehr, Bredehoeft stepped up to the role of editor-in-chief of Groundwater, the flagship technical journal of the National Ground Water Association. He served in that role from 1992 to 1995. In December 1997, Bredehoeft received the Robert E. Horton Medal of the American Geophysical Union for "outstanding contributions to the geophysical aspects of hydrology". He also received the 1997 Penrose Medal, the Geological Society of America's highest award.

On January 1, 2023, Bredehoeft died at his Sausalito, California, home. He is profiled in the book A to Z of Earth Scientists.

== Notable awards ==
Bredehoeft received multiple awards for his contributions to hydrology, hydrogeology and geology more broadly. These include:

- 1975 – O.E. Meinzer Award
- 1979 – Fellow of the American Geophysical Union
- 1991 – M. King Hubbert Award
- 1994 – Election to the National Academy of Engineering
- 1997 – Penrose Medal
- 1997 – Robert E. Horton Medal

== Sources ==
- King, Michael (2024). "John D. Bredehoeft (1933–2023)". Memorial Tributes. 27. National Academies Press.
- Konikow, Leonard F.; Reichard, Eric G.; King, Michael J. (2023). "John D. Bredehoeft (1933–2023)—A geologist at the frontiers of hydrogeology". Groundwater. 61 (3): 446–451. doi:10.1111/gwat.13313. ISSN 1745-6584.
