= John M. Sharp =

John M. (Jack) Sharp Jr. is Dave P. Carlton Professor of Geology at The University of Texas at Austin. He was the president of the Geological Society of America from June 2007 to June 2008.

He received a B. Geol. E. with distinction from the University of Minnesota in 1967, a M.S. in geology from Midwestern State University, and a PhD in geology from the University of Illinois in 1974. After teaching at the University of Missouri from 1974 to 1982, he joined the University of Texas faculty, where he was Gulf Foundation Centennial Professor of Geology and C. E. Yager Professor of Geology from 1989 to 1993, Centennial Professor of Geology from 1993 to 2002, and Dave P. Carlton Professor from 2002 on.

His research deals with flow in fractured rocks, the hydrology of arid zones, and the effects of urbanization. He is particularly concerned with the hydrogeology of sedimentary basins, and with ore deposit formation.

Sharp has published over 280 journal articles and abstracts, and over ten monographs/book chapters, as well as many conference presentations and book reviews. He was from 1995 to 2002 the editor of Environmental and Engineering Geoscience.

John Sharp received the Meinzer Award from the Geological Society of America in 1979, the C.V. Theis Award from the American Institute of Hydrology in 1996 and the AIH Founders Award from the American Institute of Hydrology in 1998.
