= Numerical Methods for Partial Differential Equations =

- Discipline: Partial differential equations, numerical analysis
- Language: English
- Edited by: Clayton G. Webster

Publication details
- History: 1985-present
- Publisher: John Wiley & Sons
- Frequency: Bimonthly
- Impact factor: 3.009 (2020)

Standard abbreviations
- ISO 4: Numer. Methods Partial Differ. Equ.
- MathSciNet: Numer. Methods Partial Differential Equations

Indexing
- ISSN: 0749-159X (print); 1098-2426 (web)
- LCCN: 85642963
- OCLC no.: 888484016

Links
- Journal homepage; Online access; Online archive

Numerical Methods for Partial Differential Equations is a bimonthly peer-reviewed scientific journal covering the development and analysis of new methods for the numerical solution of partial differential equations. It was established in 1985 and is published by John Wiley & Sons. The editors-in-chief are George F. Pinder (University of Vermont) and John R. Whiteman (Brunel University).

== Abstracting and indexing ==
The journal is abstracted and indexed in:

- CSA databases
- Current Contents/Engineering, Computing & Technology
- EBSCO databases
- Ei Compendex
- Inspec
- MathSciNet
- ProQuest databases
- Science Citation Index Expanded
- Scopus
- Zentralblatt MATH

According to the Journal Citation Reports, the journal has a 2020 impact factor of 3.009.
