= Soroosh Sorooshian =

American civil engineer and academic

- Born: 1948 (age 77–78); Kerman, Iran
- Education: California Polytechnic State University; University of California, Los Angeles
- Awards: Robert E. Horton Medal (2013)
- Scientific career
- Fields: Civil Engineering; Hydrology; Remote Sensing
- Workplaces: University of California Irvine; University of Arizona; Case Western Reserve University
- Website: Faculty page at UC Irvine

Soroosh Sorooshian (born 1948) is an Iranian-born American civil engineer, and educator. He is a distinguished professor of civil and environmental engineering at the University of California, Irvine and currently serving as the Director of the Center for Hydrometeorology and Remote Sensing.

== Biography ==
Sorooshian was born in a Zoroastrian family in Kerman, Iran. He did his primary education in Kerman before moving to United States in 1966.

He got his Bachelor of Science in mechanical engineering from Cal Poly San Luis Obispo, and MSc and PhD from University of California, Los Angeles (UCLA) in systems engineering.

Sorooshian is a member of such prestigious organizations as the National Academy of Engineering and the International Academy of Astronautics. He is also a fellow of the AAAS, AGU, and the IWRA, among others. Besides being a member and fellow of certain places, he was also a chairman for the Global Energy and Water Cycle Experiment of the World Climate Research Programme. In 2009 he was appointed as the California Council on Science and Technology member.

== Awards ==
In 2003, he was elected a member of the National Academy of Engineering for developing flood-forecasting models used worldwide in hydrologic services. In 2005 Sorooshian was awarded the NASA Distinguished Public Service Medal and in 2006 was awarded the Robert E. Horton Memorial Lectureship award by the American Meteorological Society. A year later, he became a recipient of the Great Man-made River Water Prize which was given to him by UNESCO itself for developing such foundations as the Center for Hydrometeorology and Remote Sensing at the University of California Irvine and the Sustainability of semi-Arid Hydrologic and Riparian Areas which is a division of the University of Arizona. In 2009, AMS again awarded him, and the same year received Distinguished Engineering Educator Award from the Orange County Engineering Council. In 2010, he became the 4th Prince Sultan Bin Abdulaziz International Prize for Water recipient and was named an honorary professor by the Beijing Normal University. During the same year he also became an associate fellow at both TWAS and the Academy of Sciences. In 2013, he received the Robert E. Horton Medal from the American Geophysical Union (AGU) for his "outstanding contributions to hydrology". He was also recipient of the 2017 Ven Te chow award from the American Society of Civil Engineers’ Environmental and Water Resources Institute in recognition of his lifetime achievements in the field of hydrology and hydrometeorology. In 2019, he was made a fellow of the International Union of Geodesy and Geophysics.
