= Gerald H. Luttrell =

American engineer

Gerald H. Luttrell is an American retired engineer.

Luttrell earned his bachelor's (1980), master's (1982), and doctoral (1986) degrees from Virginia Tech, then immediately joined the faculty. In 2004, he became A.T. Massey Coal Company Professor of Mining and Minerals Engineering. In 2005, the American Institute of Mining, Metallurgical, and Petroleum Engineers gave Luttrell the Perry Nicholls Award. He received AIME's Robert H. Richards Award in 2012. The following year, Luttrell was elected a member of the United States National Academy of Engineering. He retired in 2020, and was granted emeritus status.
