= Mojdeh Delshad =

Mojdeh Delshad is Research Professor at PGE department at University of Texas at Austin. She has obtained M.Sc. and Ph.D. degrees from petroleum engineering under the supervision of Dr. Gary Pope. In the last 30 years, she has been involved in research on reservoir simulation, enhanced oil recovery and modeling naturally fractured reservoirs. She is responsible for the development and user support of UTCHEM, the University of Texas at Austin chemical flooding oil simulator.

In July 2013, she co-founded Ultimate EOR Services LLC and later became president of the company.
