= Derek Elsworth =

English-American geoscientist

Derek Elsworth is a British-American engineer and geophysicist and the G. Albert Shoemaker Chair in Mineral Engineering at Pennsylvania State University.

Elsworth completed a bachelor of science degree with honors at Portsmouth Polytechnic, earned a master of science degree with distinction from Imperial College London, then graduated from University of California, Berkeley with a PhD. He began teaching at Pennsylvania State University in 1985. In 2015, Elsworth was elected a member of the United States National Academy of Engineering.
