= Raja V. Ramani =

Indian-American scientist

Raja V. Ramani is an Indian-American scientist and Professor of Mining Engineering. He is best known for improvements in the health and safety of miners through a better understanding of the nature and control of airborne particulates.

== Biography ==
Ramani received his bachelor's degree from Indian School of Mines, Dhanbad. In 1968 he completed his M.S., and in 1970 he earned his Ph.D. from Penn State University. He has been a member of the faculty of Penn State University since 1970. In 1998, he was appointed to the George H. Jr. and Anne B. Deike Chair in Mining Engineering.

In 2005, Ramani was elected a member of the National Academy of Engineering for improvements in the health and safety of miners through a better understanding of the nature and control of airborne particulates.

In 2014, Ramani was selected as the Fulbright-Nehru Distinguished Chair to the Indian Institute of Technology Kharagpur.
