= Eos (magazine) =

Academic journal of the American Geophysical Union

- Discipline: Earth science, Geophysics
- Language: English

Publication details
- History: 1919–present
- Publisher: John Wiley & Sons (United States)
- Frequency: Monthly

Standard abbreviations
- ISO 4: Eos

Indexing
- ISSN: 0096-3941 (print); 2324-9250 (web)

Links
- Journal homepage

Eos (formerly Eos, Transactions, American Geophysical Union) is the news magazine published by the American Geophysical Union (AGU). The magazine publishes news and opinions relevant to the Earth and space sciences, as well as in-depth features on current research and on the relationship of geoscience to social and political questions. Eos is published online daily, and as an AGU member benefit in 11 issues a year. It accepts both display and classified advertising.

== History ==
Transactions, American Geophysical Union, began as a way to distribute information about AGU's annual meetings. Launched in 1920, the first volume was reprinted from volume 6, number 10 of the Proceedings of the National Academy of Sciences as National Research Council Reprint and Circular Series, number 11, and appeared under the title Scientific papers presented before the American Geophysical Union. It compiled papers from AGU's second annual meeting. These transactions were not printed but were mimeographed for limited distribution only.

Transactions changed its scope over the following decades. In 1945, it increased its publication to six times a year and began accepting peer-reviewed articles on Earth and space science topics. In 1959, Transactions became a quarterly.

In 1969, the publication added Eos to its name for Eos, the Greek goddess of dawn, representing for AGU the new light being shed by geophysical research on the understanding of Earth and its environment. At this time, the magazine began to be published monthly. In 1979, Eos, Transactions, American Geophysical Union began publication as a weekly tabloid newspaper. Eos.org was launched in 2014, publishing daily with a monthly print version distributed to AGU members.

Issues of Eos published between 1997 and 2014 are available in the Wiley Online Library. All content published since December 2014 is available online at Eos.org.

== Content and contributors ==
Eos accepts contributions from both scientists and professional journalists, focusing on news relevant to Earth and space scientists around the world, with topics including planetary science, hydrology, geology, and natural hazards. It also features articles on science policy and programs. In 2019, it began publishing articles translated into Spanish, and in 2021, simplified Chinese translations of some articles were added to the site.

Although Eos is not a peer-reviewed journal, it maintains a board of Science Advisers representing the various scientific disciplines of AGU.

Eos has won numerous awards, including those from the Washington, D.C., chapters of the American Institute of Graphic Arts and the Society of Professional Journalists.

== Abstracting and indexing ==
Eos is indexed by GeoRef, GEOBASE, Scopus, PubMed, and several other databases. It is a GeoRef priority journal.
