= Shemin Ge =

Chinese hydrogeologist

- Education: Wuhan University of Technology; University of British Columbia; Johns Hopkins University
- Scientific career
- Fields: Hydrogeology
- Workplaces: University of Colorado Boulder

Shemin Ge is a hydrogeologist who is a distinguished professor of geological sciences at the University of Colorado Boulder. She researches groundwater in Earth's crust.

== Life ==
Ge earned a B.S. from Wuhan University of Technology in 1982. She received a M.S. from the University of British Columbia in 1985. Ge earned a Ph.D. in hydrogeology from Johns Hopkins University in 1990.

Ge is a hydrogeologist who researches groundwater in Earth's crust. In 1993, she joined the faculty at the University of Colorado Boulder. She is a distinguished professor of geological sciences. She became a fellow the Geological Society of America and American Geophysical Union in 2006 and 2023 respectively.
