= Ganesh C. Thakur =

Ganesh C. Thakur is an Indian-American petroleum engineer.

Thakur completed a Bachelor of Science degree in petroleum engineering with honors at the Indian School of Mines. He then earned a Master of Arts in mathematics and a Master of Science in petroleum engineering, both at Pennsylvania State University. He remained at Penn State to obtain a PhD in petroleum engineering. After moving to Houston, Thakur entered Houston Baptist University for a master of business administration degree.

Thakur has advised Tachyus, Geo-Park and YPF, worked for the Chevron Corporation for 37 years, and is a distinguished professor and director of energy industry partnerships at the University of Houston.

In 2016, Thakur was elected a member of the United States National Academy of Engineering. In 2019, he was elected an honorary member of the American Institute of Mining, Metallurgical, and Petroleum Engineers.

Thakur's grandfathers were teachers, and inspired his eventual transition to academia. He and his wife Pushpa raised three children.
