= Richard Hogg (engineer) =

American engineer (born 1938)

Richard Hogg (born January 6, 1938) is an American retired engineer.

Hogg joined Pennsylvania State University’s Department of Material Preparation in 1969. After it was renamed the Department of Energy and Mineral Engineering, Hogg led the department's Mineral Processing Section between 1986 and 1998. From 1993 to 2000, Hogg headed Penn State's Geo-Environmental Engineering Program. Upon his retirement, Hogg was granted emeritus status. in 2012, Hogg was elected a member of the United States National Academy of Engineering.
