= George F. Pinder =

American environmental engineer

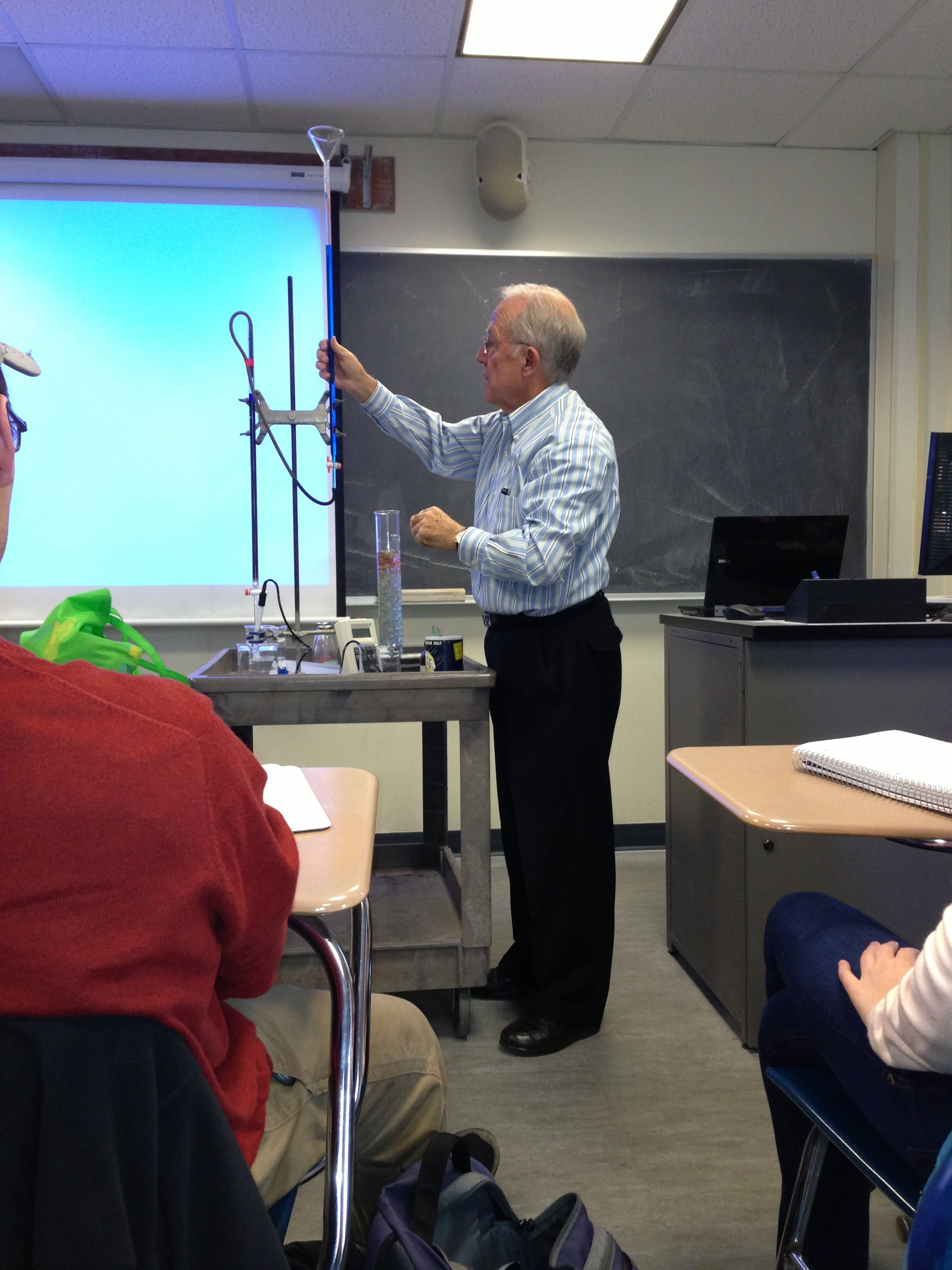
- Pinder performing an adsorption experiment.
- Born: 1942 (age 83–84)
- Education: University of Illinois at Urbana-Champaign
- Scientific career
- Fields: civil engineering
- Workplaces: University of Vermont
- Thesis: A Numerical Technique for Aquifer Evaluation (1968)
- Doctoral advisor: Don U. Deere

George Francis Pinder (born 1942) is an American environmental engineer who is Professor of Civil and Environmental Engineering with a secondary appointment in Mathematics and Statistics at the University of Vermont. He also served as a professional witness in various notable environmental cases including Love Canal and the Woburn groundwater contamination incident.

He was elected a member of the National Academy of Engineering in 2010 for leadership in groundwater modeling applied to diverse problems in water resources. He is founding editor of the journal "Advances in Water Resources", and he served as editor-in-chief of the journal Numerical Methods for Partial Differential Equations.

Pinder's principal research interest is in the development of numerical methods to solve complex problems pertaining to groundwater contamination and supply. He has published approximately one hundred and thirty five papers in refereed journals in the area of quantitative analysis of subsurface flow and transport, as well as twelve books.

== In popular culture ==
Pinder was featured as a character in the movie A Civil Action, based on the Woburn toxic waste case and starring John Travolta. He was portrayed by British actor Stephen Fry. He and his wife Phyllis were also featured in the book on which the film is based.
