= Hydrogeology Journal =

- Discipline: Hydrogeology
- Language: English
- Edited by: C.I. Voss

Publication details
- History: 1992–present
- Publisher: Springer Science+Business Media
- Frequency: 8/year
- Impact factor: 1.718 (2013)

Standard abbreviations
- ISO 4: Hydrogeol. J.

Indexing
- ISSN: 1431-2174 (print); 1435-0157 (web)

Links
- Journal homepage

Hydrogeology Journal is a peer-reviewed scientific journal published eight times a year by Springer Science+Business Media. It was established in 1992 and is the official journal of the International Association of Hydrogeologists. The journal publishes papers on both theoretical and applied aspects of hydrogeology. Papers focus on integrating subsurface hydrology and geology with other supporting disciplines (such as geochemistry, geophysics, geomorphology, geobiology, surface-water hydrology, tectonics, mathematics, numerical modeling, economics, and sociology) to explain phenomena observed in the field. The journal has a 2013 impact factor of 1.718. The editor-in-chief is Clifford I. Voss (United States Geological Survey).
