= Steven M. Gorelick =

American hydrologist

Steven M. Gorelick is an American hydrologist. He is the Cyrus Fisher Tolman Professor of Earth System Science at Stanford University and a senior fellow at the Stanford Woods Institute for the Environment, where he directs the Global Freshwater Initiative.

Gorelick graduated from the New College of California in 1975 with a Bachelor of Arts degree, then completed a Master of Science and PhD in hydrology at Stanford University in 1977 and 1981, respectively. He worked for the United States Geological Survey until 1988, when he returned to Stanford as a faculty member.

He received the M. King Hubbert Award in 2004. In 2012, Gorelick was elected a member of the United States National Academy of Engineering. Four years later, he was elected a fellow of the American Association for the Advancement of Science.
