= International Association of Hydrogeologists =

- Abbreviation: IAH
- Formation: 1956; 70 years ago
- Type: INGO
- Region served: Worldwide
- Official language: English
- Parent organization: International Council for Science (ICSU) International Social Science Council (ISSC)
- Website: iah.org

The International Association of Hydrogeologists (IAH) is a scientific and educational organisation whose aims are to promote research into and understanding of the proper management and protection of groundwater for the common good throughout the world.

== About ==
The IAH is a professional association for those within disciplines and employment related to groundwater, its occurrence, utilization, testing and management. IAH was established to foster closer ties, cooperation and information exchange related to the study of groundwater. IAH is non-government and non-profit and has over 3800 members internationally from around 135 countries. The Association is affiliated with the International Union of Geological Sciences (IUGS), and was founded during the 20th International Geological Congress in 1956.

The IAH publishes the Hydrogeology Journal eight times a year and two book series. In addition it provides various resources for those in the groundwater community.

== Aims of the Association ==
The International Association of Hydrogeologists is a non-profit organization with the following objectives:

1. promote international and national cooperation between involved scientists and engineers.
2. sponsor international and national technical/management meetings and symposia on hydrogeology.
3. publish hydrogeological reports, papers and maps.
4. establish investigation commissions and working groups to report on special topics.
5. encourage the international application of relevant approaches and techniques for the benefit of the hydrological and human environment.
