= SPE John Franklin Carll Award =

SPE John Franklin Carll Award is one of the Society of Petroleum Engineers' (SPE) highest prizes, established in 1956. It recognizes contributions of applications of engineering practices in petroleum development and recovery. The prize is named in honor of John Franklin Carll, a geologist of the 19th century, who was involved with writing reports on oil and gas surveys.
