= National Ground Water Association =

Nonprofit organization in Westerville, Ohio

The National Ground Water Association (NGWA), headquartered in Westerville, Ohio, is a membership-based nonprofit organization.

Founded in 1948, the organization is composed of United States and international groundwater professionals in four membership divisions: water well contractors, scientists and engineers, manufacturers, and suppliers. The group, that includes hydrogeologists, promotes responsible water use.

NGWA provides short courses, conferences, and webinars related to the science of groundwater and the groundwater industry to both its members and the general public. It publishes two peer-reviewed journals: Groundwater and Groundwater Monitoring & Remediation, as well as a trade publication, Water Well Journal. The association also offers voluntary certification programs.

NGWA also operates a separate nonprofit foundation, the National Ground Water Research and Educational Foundation.

The organization hosts Groundwater Week to bring together professionals from within the groundwater industry.
