= List of members of the National Academy of Engineering (special fields and interdisciplinary) =

This list is a subsection of the List of members of the National Academy of Engineering, which includes members and international members of the United States National Academy of Engineering, living and deceased, each affiliated with one of the academy's disciplinary sections. Members are listed under their primary section, and each entry gives the person's name, primary institution, and election year. For deceased members, the year of death is noted.

== Special Fields and Interdisciplinary ==
Name	Institution	Year elected
Harold M. Agnew (died 2013)	General Atomics	1976
Clarence R. Allen (died 2021)	California Institute of Technology	1976
Arsham Amirikian (died 1990)	Amirikian Engineering Company	1980
Betsy Ancker-Johnson (died 2020)	General Motors Corporation	1975
Martha C. Anderson	U.S. Department of Agriculture	2024
Noel Wayne Anderson	Grand Farm	2026
James R. Asay	Washington State University	2003
Daniel E. Atkins III	University of Michigan	2014
David Atlas (died 2015)	NASA Goddard Space Flight Center	1986
Ken Austin (died 2019)	A-dec, Inc.	1999
Walter C. Bachman (died 1991)	Gibbs & Cox, Inc.	1967
Stanley Backer (died 2003)	Massachusetts Institute of Technology	1992
Santokh S. Badesha	Purdue University	2021
Arthur B. Baggeroer	Massachusetts Institute of Technology	1995
Vanderlei Salvador Bagnato	University of Sao Paulo	2025
Daniel N. Baker	University of Colorado Boulder	2010
James G. Baker (died 2005)	Harvard University	1979
Martin Balser (died 2016)	Northrop Grumman Corporation	2014
Peter M. Banks	Independent Consultant	1993
James Edwin Barger	Raytheon BBN Technologies	2011
Frank S. Barnes	University of Colorado Boulder	2001
Rodolphe Barrangou	North Carolina State University	2019
Paul David Bates	University of Bristol	2026
James Gladen Bellingham	Johns Hopkins University	2021
Jon Atli Benediktsson	University of Iceland	2025
Leo L. Beranek (died 2016)	American Academy of Arts and Sciences	1966
Keith John Beven	Lancaster University	2017
J. Robert Beyster (died 2014)	Foundation for Enterprise Development	1989
David T. Blackstock (died 2021)	The University of Texas	1992
Charles P. Blankenship Jr.	Woodward, Inc.	2016
Bruce A. Bolt (died 2005)	University of California, Berkeley	1978
Richard H. Bolt (died 2002)	BBN Corporation	1978
Leon E. Borgman (died 2007)	L.E. Borgman, Inc.	1999
Frank L. Bowman	Strategic Decisions, LLC	2009
Rafael L. Bras	Georgia Institute of Technology	2001
Marinus Aart Van den Brink	ASML	2021
Harold Brown (died 2019)	Center for Strategic and International Studies	1967
Robert Clinton Brown	Iowa State University	2025
Keith A. Browning	University of Reading	1992
Wilfried H. Brutsaert	Cornell University	1994
Solomon J. Buchsbaum (died 1993)	AT&T Bell Laboratories	1973
Kimberly Susan Budil	Lawrence Livermore National Laboratory	2026
Ursula M. Burns	Xerox	2013
Antonio J. Busalacchi Jr.	University Corporation for Atmospheric Research	2016
Joost A. Businger (died 2023)	University of Washington	2001
James Carlini	Leidos	2026
Albert Carnesale	University of California, Los Angeles	2011
William F. Cassidy (died 2002)	U.S. Army Corps of Engineers	1967
Anny Cazenave	LEGOS-CNES	2026
Moustafa T. Chahine (died 2011)	NASA Jet Propulsion Laboratory, Caltech	2009
Jean-Lou A. Chameau	California Institute of Technology	2009
William Joseph Chancellor (died 2017)	University of California, Davis	2005
Frederick R. Chang	Boston College	2016
Robert L. Clark Jr.	University of Rochester	2022
Archie R. Clemins (died 2020)	Caribou Technologies, Inc.	2006
Steven F. Clifford (died 2007)	University of Colorado Boulder	1997
Harvey E. Cline (died 2023)	GE Corporate Research and Development	1993
Lloyd S. Cluff (died 2019)	Pacific Gas and Electric Company	1978
Robert L. Coble (died 1992)	Massachusetts Institute of Technology	1978
Morton Collins (died 2021)	MCollins Ventures	2016
Bruce G. Collipp (died 2017)	Independent Consultant	1991
Genevieve M. Comte-Bellot	Ecole Centrale de Lyon	2005
Rory A. Cooper	University of Pittsburgh	2024
Dale R. Corson (died 2012)	Cornell University	1981
Henry Cox	Lockheed Martin Corporation	2002
John Pina Craven (died 2015)	Common Heritage Corporation	1970
Norval H. Curry (died 1995)	Curry-Wille & Associates Consulting Engineers P.C.	1988
Charles R. Cushing	C.R. Cushing & Co., Inc.	2004
John Davies	Intel Corporation	2022
Henry J. Degenkolb (died 1989)	Degenkolb Engineers	1977
William P. Delaney	MIT Lincoln Laboratory	2012
Georgia Destouni	Stockholm University	2024
Robert E. Dickinson	The University of Texas	2002
Louis John Doerr	Kleiner Perkins	2026
James H. Dooley	Forest Concepts, LLC	2025
Frederick J. Doyle (died 2013)	U.S. Geological Survey	1989
James J. Duderstadt (died 2024)	University of Michigan	1987
Robert Warren Dudley	BP	2026
Robert A. Duffy (died 2015)	The Charles Stark Draper Laboratory, Inc.	1980
Robert C. Duncan (died 2003)	Hicks & Associates Inc.	1981
Ira Dyer (died 2016)	Massachusetts Institute of Technology	1976
Peter S. Eagleson (died 2021)	Massachusetts Institute of Technology	1982
Martin Forest Eberhard	Tesla Motors Inc.	2025
J. Gary Eden	University of Illinois Urbana-Champaign	2014
Helen T. Edwards (died 2016)	Fermi National Accelerator Laboratory	1988
Merril Eisenbud (died 1997)	The University of North Carolina at Chapel Hill	1977
Charles Elachi	Jet Propulsion Laboratory	1989
Kenneth McK. Eldred (died 2012)	Ken Eldred Engineering	1975
James O. Ellis Jr.	Stanford University	2013
Elfatih A.B. Eltahir	Massachusetts Institute of Technology	2023
Tony F. W. Embleton (died 2020)	National Research Council of Canada	1987
Dara Entekhabi	Massachusetts Institute of Technology	2017
Eric D. Evans	MIT Lincoln Laboratory	2015
Leonard Evans	Science Serving Society	1998
Odd M. Faltinsen	Norwegian University of Science and Technology	1991
P. Ole Fanger (died 2006)	Technical University of Denmark	2001
Stephen D. Fantone	Optikos Corporation	2022
Frank Reginald Farmer (died 2001)	University of Bradford	1980
Craig I. Fields	U.S. Department of Defense	2022
James R. Fienup	University of Rochester	2012
Dimitar P. Filev	Ford Motor Company	2018
Essex E. Finney Jr.	U.S. Department of Agriculture	1994
Millard S. Firebaugh	University of Maryland	2000
Irene K. Fischer (died 2009)	Defense Mapping Agency	1979
George M.C. Fisher	Eastman Kodak	1994
Richard C. Flagan	California Institute of Technology	2010
John E. Flipse (died 2007)	Princeton University	1982
Samuel C. Florman (died 2024)	Kreisler Borg Florman General Construction Company	1995
Jay W. Forrester (died 2016)	Massachusetts Institute of Technology	1967
Hans G. Forsberg (died 2021)	Aangpannefoereningens Forskningsstiftelse	1994
Efi Foufoula-Georgiou	University of California, Irvine	2018
Robert B. Fridley (died 2006)	University of California, Davis	1985
Eli Fromm (died 2025)	Drexel University	2004
Robert A. Frosch (died 2020)	Harvard University	1971
Lee-Lueng Fu	Jet Propulsion Laboratory	2008
Rong Fu	University of California, Los Angeles	2024
Ashok J. Gadgil	University of California, Berkeley	2013
Paul G. Gaffney II	Monmouth University	2010
Donald F. Galloway (died 1996)	Independent Consultant	1984
William J. Galloway	BBN Corporation	1979
John C. Geyer (died 1995)	Johns Hopkins School of Medicine	1970
John H. Gibbons (died 2015)	Resource Strategies	1994
Jacqueline Gail (Berg) Gish	Northrop Grumman Aerospace Systems	2011
Lawrence R. Glosten (died 2010)	The Glosten Associates, Inc.	1990
Dan M. Goebel	NASA Jet Propulsion Laboratory, Caltech	2015
Daniel Gold	Israel Ministry of Defense	2025
Robert C. Gooding (died 1999)	Columbia Research Corporation	1976
James R. Gosler	Johns Hopkins University Applied Physics Laboratory	2024
Earl E. Gossard (died 2009)	National Oceanic and Atmospheric Administration	1990
Richard A. Gottscho	Lam Research	2016
Martha R. Grabowski	Le Moyne College	2024
Thomas E. Graedel	Yale University	2002
Eugene L. Grant (died 1996)	Stanford University	1987
Dorota A. Grejner-Brzezinska	University of Wisconsin-Madison	2019
Eric T. B. Gross (died 1988)	Rensselaer Polytechnic Institute	1978
John M. Guerra	Nanoptek Corp.	2024
Charles T. Haan (died 2024)	Oklahoma State University	1995
Thomas H. Vonder Haar	Colorado State University	2003
Albert C. Hall (died 1992)	Independent Consultant	1970
Carl W. Hall (died 2014)	Engineering Information Services	1989
William S. Hammack	University of Illinois	2022
Cyril M. Harris (died 2011)	Columbia University	1975
Howard R. Hart Jr. (died 2025)	GE Corporate Research and Development	1991
Thomas J. Hayes III (died 2004)	International Engineering Company	1975
Susanne V. Hering	Aerosol Dynamics, Inc.	2020
Wilmot N. Hess (died 2004)	U.S. Department of Energy	1976
Marillyn A. Hewson	Lockheed Martin	2025
Edward A. Hiler	Texas A&M University	1987
Stephanie C. Hill	Lockheed Martin Rotary & Mission Systems	2025
Raymond J. Hodge (died 1990)	Tippetts-Abbett-McCarthy-Stratton	1983
Lawrence H. Hodges (died 2000)	Technical Affairs Consultant	1985
Klaus G. Hoehn	John Deere	2022
George E. Holbrook (died 1987)	E. I. du Pont de Nemours & Company	1964
Frederic A. L. Holloway (died 1990)	Exxon Corporation	1965
George M. Hornberger	Vanderbilt University	1996
Barry M. Horowitz (died 2025)	University of Virginia	1996
Edward E. Horton (died 2015)	Horton Offshore	2002
Charles L. Hosler Jr. (died 2023)	Pennsylvania State University	1978
William Jack Howard (died 2010)	Sandia National Laboratories	1979
Freeman A. Hrabowski III	University of Maryland, Baltimore County	2022
Norden E. Huang	National Central University	2000
Thomas Parke Hughes (died 2014)	University of Pennsylvania	2003
Salim M. Ibrahim	E. I. du Pont de Nemours & Company	1999
Masaru Ibuka (died 1997)	Sony Corporation	1976
Jorg Imberger	University of Miami	2006
K. Uno Ingard (died 2014)	Massachusetts Institute of Technology	1980
Petros Ioannou	University of Southern California	2022
Ray R. Irani	Ray Investments, LLC.	2012
Paul E. Jacobs	XCOM Labs	2016
Leah H. Jamieson	Purdue University	2005
George R. Jasny (died 2001)	Martin Marietta Energy Systems, Inc.	1983
Marvin E. Jensen (died 2022)	Colorado State University	1988
Stuart D. Jessup	Naval Surface Warfare Center	2007
Ashok Jhunjhunwala	Indian Institute of Technology - Madras	2018
Miriam E. John	Sandia National Laboratories	2023
Herbert H. Johnson (died 1989)	Cornell University	1987
Charles Johnson-Bey	Engineering Research Visioning Alliance	2024
James W. Jones	University of Florida	2012
Chandrashekhar Janardan Joshi	University of California, Los Angeles	2014
Samantha Benton Joye	University of Georgia	2026
Eugenia Kalnay (died 2024)	University of Maryland	1996
Dean Kamen	DEKA Research and Development Corporation	1997
Susumu Kato (died 2020)	Kyoto University	1995
Kristina B. Katsaros	National Oceanic and Atmospheric Administration	2001
Gabriel George Katul	Duke University	2023
Alfred A. H. Keil (died 2002)	Massachusetts Institute of Technology	1966
Jack Keller (died 2013)	Keller-Bliesner Engineering LLC	1987
Terri L. Kelly	University of Delaware	2021
Justin E. Kerwin (died 2021)	Massachusetts Institute of Technology	2000
Timothy L. Killeen	National Science Foundation	2007
Jeong H. Kim	Alcatel-Lucent	2004
Michael D. King	University of Colorado Boulder	2003
Augustus B. Kinzel (died 1987)	Union Carbide Corporation	1964
Martin Klein	Martin Klein Consultants	2006
Geraldine Knatz	University of Southern California	2014
Glenn Frederick Knoll (died 2014)	University of Michigan	1999
Max A. Kohler (died 2017)	National Weather Service	1981
Charles E. Kolb (died 2020)	Aerodyne Research, Inc.	2013
Jiro Kondo (died 2015)	Environmental Technology Center	1993
Witold F. Krajewski	The University of Iowa	2021
Sonia M. Kreidenweis	Colorado State University	2024
Ravindra D. Kulkarni	Elkay Chemicals Private Ltd.	2022
Ellen Jamison Kullman	E. I. du Pont de Nemours & Company	2015
William A. Kuperman (died 2024)	University of California, San Diego	2004
Mark J. Kushner	University of Michigan	2011
Benson J. Lamp (died 2012)	BJM Company, Inc.	1998
David Allen Landgrebe (died 2020)	Purdue University	2005
William W. Lang (died 2016)	Noise Control Foundation	1978
Robert C. Lanphier III (died 2023)	AGMED Inc.	1993
Louis J. Lanzerotti	New Jersey Institute of Technology	1988
Clarence E. Larson (died 1999)	Independent Consultant	1973
Kara Lavender Law	Sea Education Association	2026
S. Edward Law	University of Georgia	1996
Lou-Chuang Lee	Academia Sinica (Taiwan)	2018
Margaret A. LeMone	National Center for Atmospheric Research	1997
Ronald K. Leonard (died 2021)	Deere & Company	1999
Dennis P. Lettenmaier	University of Washington	2010
Ruby Leung	Pacific Northwest National Laboratory	2017
Robert A. Lieberman	Lumoptix, LLC	2018
George T. Ligler	Texas A&M University	2017
Robert A. Lindeman	Northrop Grumman Mission Systems	2010
Frederick C. Lindvall (died 1989)	California Institute of Technology	1967
Ray K. Linsley (died 1990)	Linsley, Kraeger Associates, Ltd.	1976
Kuo-Nan Liou (died 2021)	University of California, Los Angeles	1999
C. Gordon Little (died 2017)	University Corporation for Atmospheric Research	1974
Chao-Han Liu	Academia Sinica (Taiwan)	2012
Donald Liu	American Bureau of Shipping	2011
Richard H. Lyon (died 2019)	RH Lyon Corp.	1995
Paul B. MacCready (died 2007)	AeroVironment, Inc.	1979
Malcolm MacKinnon III (died 2019)	MacKinnon-Searle Consortium LLC (MSCL)	1998
Douglas C. MacMillan (died 2001)	Independent Consultant	1967
Herbert G. MacPherson (died 1993)	The University of Tennessee, Oak Ridge	1978
Azad M. Madni	Intelligent Systems Technology, Inc.	2021
Christopher L. Magee	Massachusetts Institute of Technology	1997
George C. Maling Jr. (died 2022)	Institute of Noise Control Engineering of the USA, Inc.	1998
Louis A. Martin-Vega	North Carolina State University	2021
Fariborz Maseeh	Surlamer Investments & the Massiah Foundation	2023
Gary S. May	University of California, Davis	2018
Larry A. Mayer	University of New Hampshire	2018
James Rufus McDonald	University of Strathclyde	2022
John H. McElroy (died 2007)	The University of Texas at Arlington	1998
Diane Marie McKnight	University of Colorado Boulder	2012
John P. McTague (died 2013)	University of California, Santa Barbara	1998
Chiang C. Mei	Massachusetts Institute of Technology	1986
R. Keith Michel	Webb Institute	2014
Arnold Migus	No Affiliation	2007
Jerome H. Milgram (died 2021)	Massachusetts Institute of Technology	1995
Richard Keith Miller	Franklin W. Olin College of Engineering	2012
Joe H. Mize	Oklahoma State University	1988
Piotr D. Moncarz	XGS Energy, Inc.	2017
Arthur L. Money	U.S. Department of Defense	2013
Tanya Mary Monro	Australian Department of Defence	2024
John A. Montgomery	Center for Naval Analyses	2013
John Bradford Mooney Jr. (died 2014)	J. Brad Mooney Associates Ltd.	1988
Duncan T. Moore	University of Rochester	1998
John R. Moore (died 2007)	Independent Consultant	1978
Richard K. Moore (died 2012)	University of Kansas	1989
William B. Morgan	David Taylor Model Basin	1992
George Michael Morris	Apollo Optical Systems Inc. and RPC Photonics, Inc.	2024
Edward I. Moses	Lawrence Livermore National Laboratory	2009
Rear Adm. Albert G. Mumma (died 1997)	U.S. Department of the Navy	1976
Herbert Allen Myers	Ag Leader Technologies	2022
F. Robert Naka (died 2013)	CERA, Inc.	1997
Hyla S. Napadensky (died 2022)	Napadensky Energetics Inc.	1984
Stuart O. Nelson (died 2025)	U.S. Department of Agriculture	1990
J. Nicholas Newman	Massachusetts Institute of Technology	1989
William A. Nierenberg (died 2000)	University of California, San Diego	1983
Chrysostomos L. Nikias	University of Southern California	2008
Karl H. Norris (died 2019)	U.S. Department of Agriculture	1980
Sharon L. Nunes	International Business Machines Corporation	2019
Wesley L. Nyborg (died 2011)	University of Vermont	1996
Brian O'Brien (died 1992)	No Affiliation	1981
Morrough P. O'Brien (died 1988)	University of California, Berkeley	1969
Richard M. Obermann	Obermann SciTech LLC	2026
Ellen Ochoa	NASA Johnson Space Center	2020
John Arthur Orcutt	University of California, San Diego	2011
Andrew J. Ouderkirk	3M	2005
Karen Ann Panetta	Tufts University	2023
Frank L. Parker (died 2022)	Vanderbilt University	1988
Claire L. Parkinson	NASA Goddard Space Flight Center	2009
Jean-Yves Parlange	Cornell University	2006
Marc Brendan Parlange	University of Rhode Island	2017
M. Elisabeth Paté-Cornell	Stanford University	1995
J. Randolph Paulling (died 2021)	University of California, Berkeley	1986
Henry M. Paynter (died 2002)	Massachusetts Institute of Technology	1997
Arno A. Penzias (died 2024)	New Enterprise Associates	1990
Eduard C. Pestel (died 1988)	University of Hannover	1981
Dean F. Peterson (died 1989)	Utah State University	1974
Henry Petroski (died 2023)	Duke University	1997
Joseph M. Pettit (died 1986)	Georgia Institute of Technology	1967
Emil Pfender (died 2016)	University of Minnesota	1986
John R. Philip (died 1999)	Commonwealth Scientific and Industrial Research Organization	1995
Owen M. Phillips (died 2010)	Johns Hopkins University	1996
Percy A. Pierre	Michigan State University	2009
Milton Pikarsky (died 1989)	The City College of the City University of New York	1973
William T. Plummer	WTP Optics, Inc	1999
David S. Potter (died 2011)	General Motors Corporation	1973
William F. Powers	Ford Motor Company	1993
Arati Prabhakar	Retired-Other	2016
Kimberly Ann Prather	University of California, San Diego	2019
Donald W. Pritchard (died 1999)	Stony Brook University	1993
William A. Radasky	Metatech Corporation	2021
José Miguel Aguilera Radic	Pontificia Universidad Catolica de Chile	2010
Sarah A Rajala	Iowa State University	2022
Simon Ramo (died 2016)	TRW Inc.	1964
Eugene M. Rasmusson (died 2015)	University of Maryland	1999
Danny D. Reible	The University of Texas	2005
John F. Reid	University of Illinois Urbana-Champaign	2019
Robert O. Reid (died 2009)	Princeton University	1985
L. Rafael Reif	Massachusetts Institute of Technology	2015
John Michael Richardson	Briny Deep LLC	2024
Eric J. Rignot	University of California, Irvine	2025
Andrea Rinaldo	Ecole Polytechnique Federale de Lausanne	2006
C. Paul Robinson (died 2023)	Sandia National Laboratories	1998
Jorge J. Rocca	Colorado State University	2024
Ignacio Rodríguez-Iturbe (died 2022)	Princeton University	1988
Dean H. Roemmich	Scripps Institution of Oceanography	2018
Thomas E. Romesser	Northrop Grumman Aerospace Systems	2003
Paul Rosenberg (died 1999)	Paul Rosenberg Associates	1970
Carl H. Rosner (died 2022)	CardioMag Imaging, Inc.	1996
H. Thomas Rossby	University of Rhode Island	2006
Rongsheng Roger Ruan	University of Minnesota	2025
Christopher Ruf	University of Michigan	2026
William H. Sanders	Rochester Institute of Technology	2023
Richard Sandstrom	Cymer, an ASML company	2025
Kamal Sarabandi	University of Michigan	2021
Henry A. Schade (died 1992)	University of California, Berkeley	1973
Jan van Schilfgaarde (died 2008)	U.S. Department of Agriculture	1989
Judith A. Schwan (died 1996)	Eastman Kodak	1982
Norman R. Scott	Cornell University	1990
Willard F. Searle Jr. (died 2009)	U.S. Department of the Navy	1982
Ralph David Semmel	Johns Hopkins University Applied Physics Laboratory	2026
Robert J. Serafin	National Center for Atmospheric Research	1994
Maurice M. Sevik (died 2011)	David Taylor Model Basin	1994
Robert R. Shannon	University of Arizona	1992
Herman E. Sheets (died 2006)	Independent Consultant	1967
J. Marshall Shepherd	University of Georgia	2021
Barry L. Shoop	Cooper Union for the Advancement of Science and Art	2019
Thomas Michael Siebel	C3 AI	2026
Neil G. Siegel	Northrop Grumman Information Systems	2005
Joanne Simpson (died 2010)	NASA Goddard Space Flight Center	1988
R. Paul Singh	University of California, Davis	2008
Richard Wayne Skaggs	North Carolina State University	1991
Lawrence H. Skromme (died 2012)	Independent Consultant	1978
Julia Slingo	Met Office	2016
Ernest T. Smerdon (died 2014)	University of Arizona	1986
Levering Smith (died 1993)	U.S. Department of the Navy	1965
Robert L. Smith (died 1995)	University of Kansas	1975
Soroosh Sorooshian	University of California, Irvine	2003
Fred Noel Spiess (died 2006)	University of California, San Diego	1985
Richard W. Spinrad	Oregon State University	2025
William E. Splinter (died 2012)	University of Nebraska–Lincoln	1984
Charles P. Spoelhof (died 2010)	Eastman Kodak	1981
Peter Staudhammer (died 2008)	University of Southern California	1996
Robert Merritt Stein (died 2019)	Independent Consultant	2019
John P. Stenbit	TRW Inc.	1999
Graeme L. Stephens	NASA Jet Propulsion Laboratory, Caltech	2015
Olin J. Stephens II (died 2008)	Sparkman and Stephens, Inc.	1994
Julius A. Stratton (died 1994)	Massachusetts Institute of Technology	1964
Richard G. Strauch	retired-former Chief of Wind Profiler Research Program	1989
Guaning Su	Nanyang Technological University	2020
Charles E. Sukup	Iowa State University	2018
Kathryn D. Sullivan	The Potomac Institute	2016
G. Russell Sutherland (died 2014)	Deere & Company	1984
Kenneth Ray Swartzel	North Carolina State University	2016
Juming Tang	Washington State University	2021
Gerald F. Tape (died 2005)	Associated Universities, Inc.	1986
Ratan Naval Tata (died 2024)	Tata Sons	2013
Valerian I. Tatarskii (died 2020)	Radio Hydro Physics, LLC	1994
Anton Tedesko (died 1994)	Independent Consultant	1967
Kirsi K. Tikka	Pacific Basin, Ardmore Shipping	2016
Myron Tribus (died 2016)	Exergy, Inc.	1973
Leung Tsang	University of Michigan	2020
Marshall P. Tulin (died 2019)	University of California, Santa Barbara	1979
Fawwaz Ulaby	University of Michigan	1995
Thomas J. Eccles USN	Trident Maritime Systems, LLC	2019
Suzanne M. Vautrinot	Battelle Memorial Institute	2017
Eugene B. Waggoner (died 1991)	Independent Consultant	1987
Don Walsh (died 2023)	International Maritime Inc.	2001
Jaw-Kai Wang	Jawkai Bioengineering R&D Center, Ltd.	1995
Gregory N. Washington	George Mason University	2023
Kenneth Edward Washington	Ken Washington LLC	2020
Warren M. Washington (died 2024)	National Center for Atmospheric Research	2002
William C. Webster	University of California, Berkeley	1998
Wilford F. Weeks (died 2017)	University of Alaska Fairbanks	1979
John V. Wehausen (died 2005)	University of California, Berkeley	1980
Robert A. Weller	Woods Hole Oceanographic Institution	2025
James G. Wenzel (died 2022)	Marine Development Associates, Inc.	1975
James E. West	Johns Hopkins University	1998
Roy F. Weston (died 2007)	Weston Solutions, Inc.	1976
Chris G. Whipple	ENVIRON	2001
Robert M. White (died 2015)	National Academy of Engineering	1968
Christopher J. Wiernicki	ABS Group of Companies	2021
F. Karl Willenbrock (died 1995)	Independent Consultant	1975
Scott Willoughby	Northrop Grumman Corporation	2024
Basil W. Wilson (died 1996)	Independent Consultant	1984
Donald C. Winter	U.S. Department of the Navy	2002
Abel Wolman (died 1989)	Johns Hopkins School of Medicine	1965
M. Gordon Wolman (died 2010)	Johns Hopkins University	2002
Eric F. Wood (died 2021)	Princeton University	2015
William Woodburn	Global Infrastructure Partners	2023
David A. Woolhiser (died 2022)	U.S. Department of Agriculture	1990
Douglas Robert Worsnop	Aerodyne Research, Inc.	2026
Jin Wu (died 2008)	Cheng Kung University	1995
Theodore Y. Wu (died 2023)	California Institute of Technology	1982
James C. Wyant (died 2023)	University of Arizona	2007
Dick K.P. Yue	Massachusetts Institute of Technology	2020
Ji Zhou	Chinese Academy of Engineering	2013
Julie Beth Zimmerman	Yale University	2025
Walter H. Zinn (died 2000)	Combustion Engineering	1974
Charles A. Zraket (died 1997)	Mitretek Systems, Inc.	1991
Dusan S. Zrnic	National Severe Storms Laboratory	2006
