= Abdin Mohamed Ali Salih =

Sudanese Civil Engineering Professor (1944-)

Professor Abdin Mohamed Ali Salih FAAS FTWAS FIWRA
- عابدين محمد علي صالح
- Born: 1 January 1944 (age 81); Wad Madani, Sudan
- Citizenship: Sudan
- Education: University of Khartoum (B.Sc); Imperial College London (DIC, Ph.D); University of Padova (Diploma)
- Children: 3
- Awards: ISESCO Award for Excellence in Scientific Research
- Scientific career
- Fields: Civil Engineering; Environmental Sciences
- Institutions: University of Khartoum; UNESCO; King Saud University

Abdin Mohamed Ali Salih FAAS FTWAS FIWRA (Arabic: عابدين محمد علي صالح, (born 1944) a Sudanese Civil Engineering Professor at the University of Khartoum and a UNESCO expert in Water Resources.

== Early life and education ==
Salih was born in Wad Madani, Sudan in 1944. (Note: Although the date of birth is noted as 1 January, this might not be true. At the time of his birth, 1 January was assigned to those who were born outside of Khartoum, e.g., Abdalla Hamdok and Omar al-Bashir.) Salih joined the University of Khartoum in 1963 and obtained a Bachelor of Science with a First Class Honors in Civil Engineering in 1969. He then received a Diploma of Imperial College and continued to complete a Doctor of Philosophy in Hydraulics in 1972 from Imperial College London. He later obtained a Diploma in Hydrology from the University of Padua, Italy, in 1974.

== Research and career ==
After his Ph.D., Salih returned to Sudan in 1973 and joined the Faculty of Engineering of the University of Khartoum as a Lecturer before becoming an associate professor in 1977. He became the head of the department of Civil Engineering in 1979, and a full professor in 1982. He became the University of Khartoum's Deputy Vice-Chancellor between 1990 and 1991. As of November 2022, he is a professor at the Department of Civil Engineering, University of Khartoum, and a member of the Governing Councils of the University of Khartoum and Sudan University of Science and Technology. He was also a professor at the College of Engineering, King Saud University, from 1982 until.

Salih's research and consulting work focuses on water security and water resources management. He served at the UNESCO from 1993 until he became a Director of the Division of Water Sciences in 2011. He was a member of the Executive Board of UNESCO from 2015 until 2019. He was also the alternate Governor of the World Water Council between 1999 and 2003. Salih works as an advisor for the High Commission for the Development of Riyadh, Saudi Arabia, and is a member of many international water societies. He has been a jury member of many international water prizes.

== Awards and honours ==
Salih was elected as a Fellow of the International Water Resources Association (FIWRA) in 1983, a Fellow of the African Academy of Sciences (FAAS) in 1993, and a Fellow of The Word Academy of Sciences (FTWAS) in 2002.

He was awarded Islamic World Educational, Scientific and Cultural Organization (ISESCO)'s Award for Excellence in Scientific Research.

== Personal life ==
Salih is married with three children.

== Selected publications ==
- Abdin M. A Salih, Uygur Sendil (1984-09-01). Evapotranspiration under Extremely Arid Climates. Journal of Irrigation and Drainage Engineering. 110 (3): 289–303. doi:10.1061/(ASCE)0733-9437(1984)110:3(289). ISSN 0733-9437.
- Solaiman A. Al-Sha'lan, Abdin M. A. Salih (1987-11-01). Evapotranspiration Estimates in Extremely Arid Areas. Journal of Irrigation and Drainage Engineering. 113 (4): 565–574. doi:10.1061/(ASCE)0733-9437(1987)113:4(565). ISSN 0733-9437.
- Abdin M. A. Salih, Ibrahim, Nagwa (1998-12-15). UNESCO's international hydrological program and sustainable water resources management in the Arab region. Desalination. Selected papers presented at The Third Gulf Water Conference Towards Efficient Utilization of Water Resources in the Gulf Water Science and Technology Association (WSTA). 120 (1): 15–22. doi:10.1016/S0011-9164(98)00197-0. ISSN 0011-9164.
- Abdin M. A. Salih (1980-10-01). Entrained Air in Linearly Accelerated Water Flow. Journal of the Hydraulics Division. 106 (10): 1595–1605. doi:10.1061/JYCEAJ.0005531.
- Abdin M. A. Salih (1985-01-01). The Nile Inside the Sudan—Increasing Demands and Their Consequences. Water International. 10 (2): 73–78. doi:10.1080/02508068508686311. ISSN 0250-8060.

== See also ==
- Elfatih Eltahir
- Yahia Abdel Mageed
