= Yahia Abdel Mageed =

Sudanese hydrologist (1925-2020)

Yahia Abdel Mageed FAAS
- يحيى عبدالمجيد

Ministry of Irrigation and Hydro-Electric Power
- In office 1971–1976

Ministry of Irrigation and Hydro-Electric Power
- In office 1977–1980

Personal details
- Born: 07 October 1925
- Died: 13 December 2020 (aged 94–95) Khartoum, Sudan
- Scientific career
- Education: Gordon Memorial College (B.Sc); Imperial College London (DIC)
- Awards: Crystal Drop Award, IWRA
- Fields: Civil Engineering; Hydrology
- Institutions: University of Khartoum, UN-WC, UNESCO, IWRA

Yahia Abdel Mageed FAAS (Arabic: يحيى عبدالمجيد, 1925–13 December 2020) was a Sudanese Minister and the Secretary-General of the 1st United Nations Water Conference.

== Early life and education ==
Yahia graduated as a civil engineer from Gordon Memorial College (now University of Khartoum) in 1950, and then completed his degree in hydrology at the Imperial College of Science and Technology.

== Research and career ==
Yahia joined the Ministry of Irrigation and Hydro-Electric Power of Sudan and became its Minister from 1971 to 1976, and from 1977 to 1980. During these 8 years he helped in building Roseires Dam, Khashm el-Girba Dam, other irrigation projects. He is famous for opposing to the building of Kajabr Dam which had disastrous effects on the region.

Kurt Waldheim, the UN's then-Secretary-General, selected Yahia as the Secretary-General of the UN Water Conference (UNWC), in Mar del Plata, Argentina, in late May 1976. Yahia took over from his predecessor, who left him with a small budget and a history of corruption. To assist UNWC in assisting Mageed with his situation, Mostafa Kamal Tolba gave substantial United Nations Environment Programme (UNEP) funds. Yahia contributed to the UNWC being one of the most successful and effective global conferences, the UN has ever hosted with his practical understanding of water, charismatic personality, and excellent administration. In his opening address to UNWC, Mageed noted:

The success of this conference will be measured not here at Mar del Plata, not by us, but by posterity over the next two decades.

By these standards, it is without a shadow of a question that UNWC was a resounding success. Compared to when he arrived, Mageed departed the UN in a far better state.

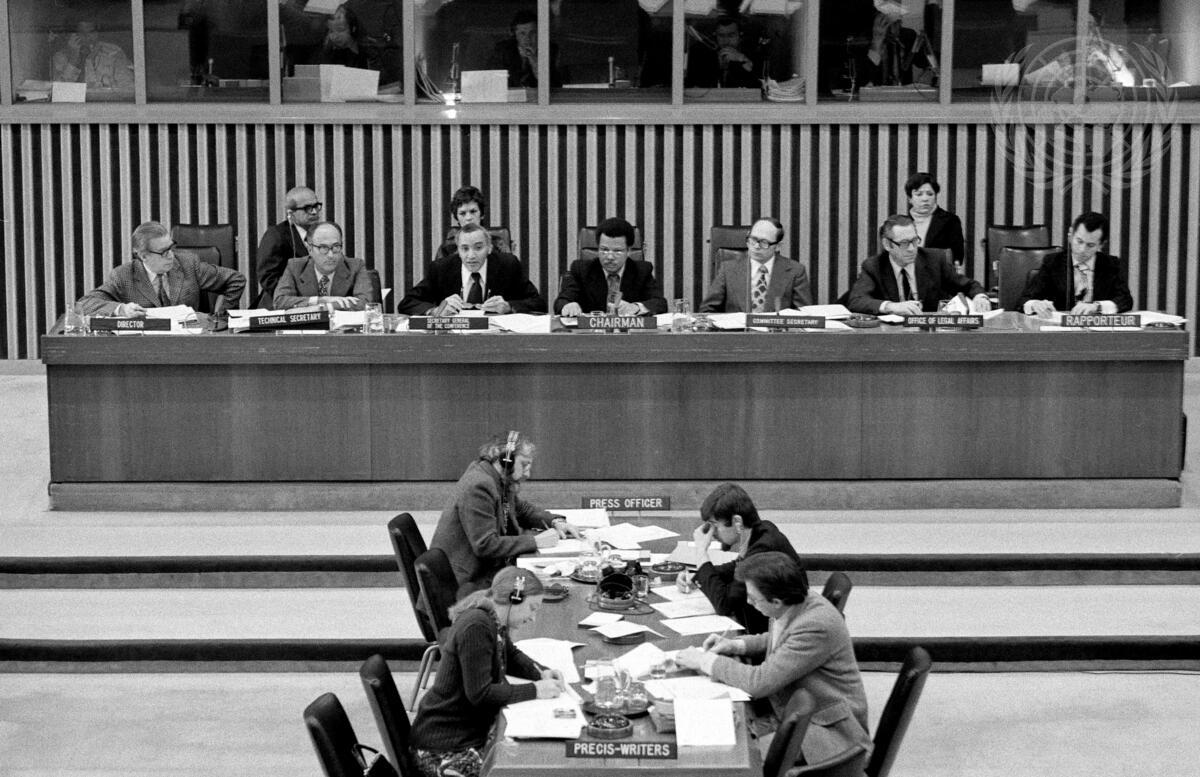
Committee on Natural Resources Holds Second Special Session as Preparatory Body for 1977 Water Conference. Yahia Abdel Mageed (3rd from left), Secretary-General of the Water Conference, is seen making a statement. To his left is Leslie O. Harriman (Nigeria), re-elected Chairman of the Committee.

Yahia, Mostafa Kamal Tolba, and Asit K. Biswas made the 1980s be recognised as the International Water Supply and Sanitation Decade (IWSSD), during which a sizable portion of the world's population would have access to clean water and sanitation. A few times after the UNWC concluded, Tolba appointed Mageed, Gilbert White, and Biswas to the International Water Resources Association (IWRA). Until Tolba departed UNEP in 1992, this Board often convened, roughly every nine months. Yahia developed and became an ardent supporter of IWRA. He had significant responsibilities in the World Water Congresses held by IWRA in Ottawa, Cairo, and Rabat. He won the IWRA vice presidential election.

He then returned to Sudan as a consultant to the government and UNESCO on Water resources and Hydrology including international disputes about the River Nile.

== Death ==
Yahia passed away in Khartoum, Sudan, from natural causes, on the evening of 13 December 2020, aged 95.

== Awards and honours ==
Yahia was a Founding Fellow of the African Academy of Sciences (1985) and was awarded IWRA’s Crystal Drop Award in 1991.

== Selected publications ==
- M Falkenmark, G Lindh, RG Tanner, YA Mageed (2019). Water For a Starving World. doi:10.4324/9780429267260.
- YA Mageed. The Nile Basin: Lessons from the Past. Water Resources Management Series:2,1page 56-185.
- Yahia Abdel Mageed (1993-01-01). Environmentally sound water management and development. International Journal of Water Resources Development. 9 (2): 155–165. doi:10.1080/07900629308722581. ISSN 0790-0627.
- Yahia Abdel Mageed (1984). The Jonglei canal: A conservation project of the Nile. International Journal of Water Resources Development. 2 (2–3): 85–101. doi:10.1080/07900628408722316. ISSN 0790-0627.

== See also ==
- Abdin Mohamed Ali Salih
- Elfatih Eltahir
