= Enrique Vivoni =

Puerto Rican scientist and engineer

Enrique R. Vivoni
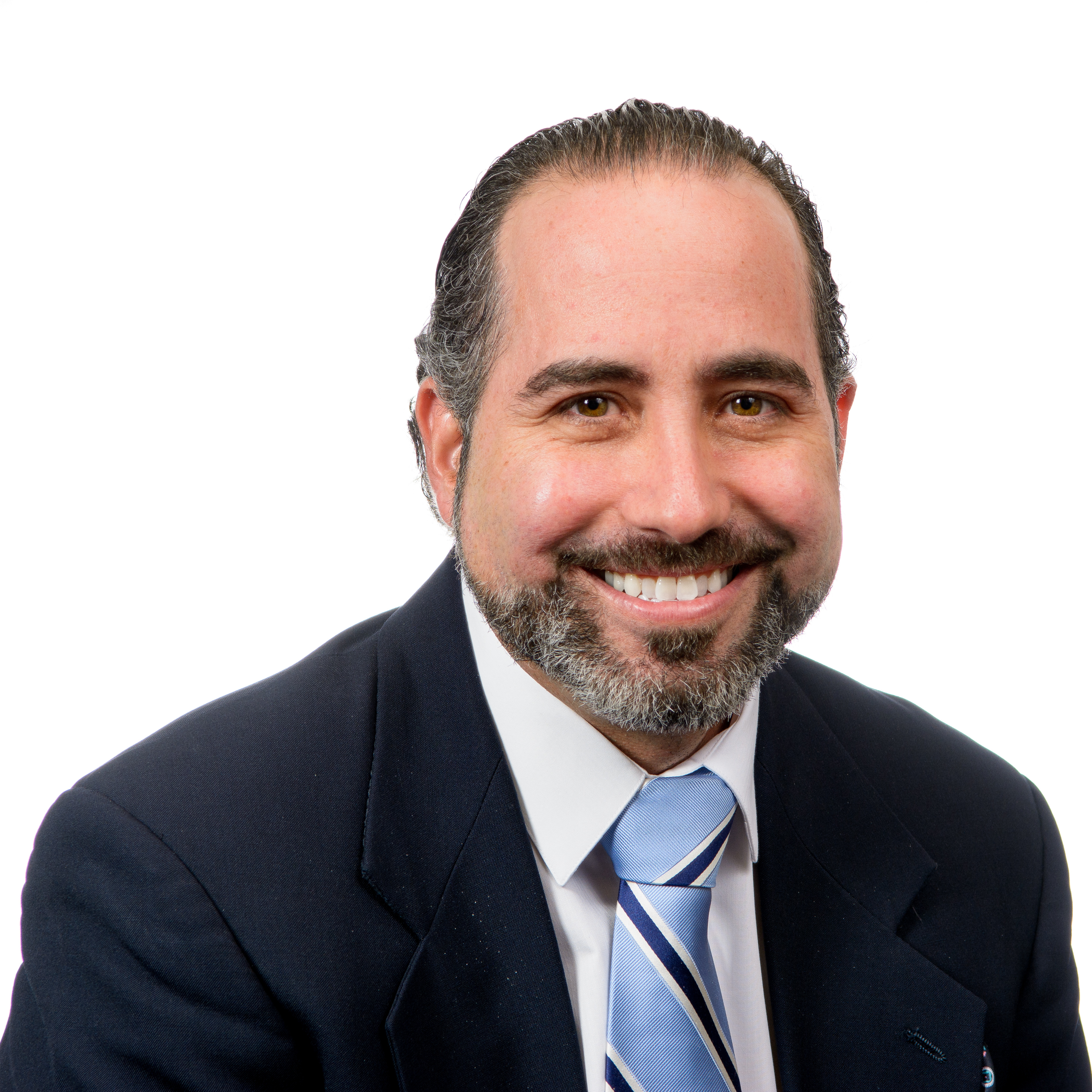
- Professor Enrique R. Vivoni
- Born: 1975 (age 50–51); San Juan, Puerto Rico
- Education: Cupeyville School; Massachusetts Institute of Technology (BS, MS, PhD)
- Scientific career
- Fields: Hydrology; Hydrometeorology; Ecohydrology; Water Management; Sustainability
- Workplaces: Director, Center for Hydrologic Innovations, 2022-Present Associate Dean, Arizona State University 2019-2021 Professor, Arizona State University 2009-Present Associate Professor, New Mexico Institute of Mining and Technology 2003-2008
- Website: Hydrologic Science, Engineering and Sustainability

Enrique R. Vivoni (born 1975) is a Puerto Rican scientist and engineer specializing in hydrology who studies the interactions of water throughout the atmosphere, biosphere, and lithosphere. His research is focused on the southwestern United States and Mexico for the purpose of improving water management in urban and rural settings.

== Early life and higher education ==
Vivoni was born in 1975 in San Juan, Puerto Rico. He states that his curiosity with water started from a young age, in particular through his involvement in Scouting in Guajataka. He also credits his childhood in Puerto Rico with fostering a belief in the values of cross-cultural education and of inclusion and diversity in research. Vivoni was a 1993 Presidential Scholar, and graduated from the Massachusetts Institute of Technology in 1996 with a B.S. in Environmental Engineering and in 1998 with an M.S. in Fluid Mechanics. In 2003, he received a Ph.D. in hydrology from MIT, under the mentorship of professors Dara Entekhabi and Rafael L. Bras. He wrote his dissertation, titled Hydrologic modeling using triangulated irregular networks : terrain representation, flood forecasting and catchment response on modeling watershed systems, specifically looking at predicting flooding using novel computational methods.

== Career in research and leadership ==
Vivoni currently serves as the director of the Center for Hydrologic Innovations at Arizona State University, and is also the Fulton Professor of Hydrosystems Engineering in the School of Sustainable Engineering and the Built Environment. He was formerly associate dean of the Graduate College. He previously served as an associate professor at New Mexico Institute of Mining and Technology from 2003 to 2009. In his capacity as associate dean, he focused on thought leadership on US-Mexico education, on supporting postdoctoral researchers and international graduate students, and on interdisciplinary efforts to mobilize knowledge.

At the Center for Hydrologic Innovations, he has developed tools and technologies that enable collaboration and improved decision making in the water resources sector. His work has supported the Salt River Project, Central Arizona Project, and Arizona Department of Environmental Quality, among other environmental and water agencies in the region. Vivoni has also launched startup companies in the water, climate and agricultural space, including Tributary and Campo.

== Honors and awards ==
- 2025, Fellow, American Geophysical Union
- 2025, Fellow, American Society of Civil Engineers
- 2025, Fellow, American Meteorological Society
- 2024, Corresponding Member, National Academy of Sciences of Mexico
- 2023, Governor’s Award for Arizona’s Future, Arizona Forward
- 2022, International Award, Mexican Carbon Program
- 2022, Curriculum Innovation Award, Lincoln Institute of Land Policy
- 2021, Fellow, American Association for the Advancement of Science
- 2021, Quentin Mees Research Award, AZ Water Association
- 2015, Distinguished Visiting Professor, Mexican Academy of Sciences
- 2015, Leopold Leadership Fellow, Woods Institute for the Environment
- 2015, Fulbright Scholar
- 2014, Walter L. Huber Civil Engineering Research Prize, American Society of Civil Engineering
- 2010, Kavli Fellow, National Academy of Science
- 2009, Presidential Early Career Award for Scientists and Engineers
