= Vujica Jevđević =

Yugoslav hydrologist and educator

- Born: 12 October 1913; Priboj, Kingdom of Serbia
- Died: 26 March 2006 (aged 92); Highlands Ranch, Colorado, U.S.
- Occupations: Hydrologist, Civil engineer
- Scientific career
- Workplaces: University of Belgrade; Colorado State University; George Washington University

Vujica Jevđević (Vujica M. Yevjevich) (12 October 1913 – 26 March 2006) was a Yugoslav hydrologist and educator.

He was the founder and the first director of the Hydroenergetic Institute in Belgrade and the Hydraulic Laboratory, institutions that led the construction of hydroelectric power plants in post-WW2 Yugoslavia. In the US, Jevđević was the director of the International Water Resources Institute at George Washington University and professor in the engineering department at Colorado State University.

== Biography ==
Jevđević graduated from the University of Belgrade before doing a specialisation in hydrology at the University of Grenoble. During World War 2 he was a war prisoner of the Axis troops, and in 1944 he successfully returned to the liberated Belgrade and joined the newly formed Ministry of Construction. He led the establishment of the new institutes for and hydroenergy, and returned to the University of Belgrade as a lecturer. There he defended his doctoral thesis in 1955 as Yugoslavia's first doctor in hydrology..

In the following years, he was a visiting scientist for the U.S. National Bureau of Standards and for the U.S. Geological Survey in Washington, D.C. before taking the professorial post at Colorado State University where he taught hydro-engineering. He was also the Director of the International Water Resources Institute at George Washington University in Washington, D.C. Jevđević won many awards during his prolific academic career, including the inaugural 1996 Ven Te Chow Award of ASCE, inaugural 1988 Ven Te Chow Award of IWRA, as well as IAHS International Hydrology Award in 1987

Jevđević died in 2006 after a long battle with Parkinson's disease.

At the time of his death, he was finishing a seven-volume autobiography.
