= Harry F. Lins =

Harry F. Lins (born 1948) is a retired hydrologist whose career was spent with the U.S. Geological Survey from 1971 to 2012. During his years at USGS, his work spanned several Earth science disciplines, including coastal processes, surface water hydrology, and hydroclimatology. Although most of his career was spent conducting research, he managed the USGS Global Change Hydrology Program from 1989 to 1997, and served as co-chair of the Intergovernmental Panel on Climate Change (IPCC) Hydrology and Water Resources Working Group for the IPCC First Assessment Report. As a result of his IPCC work, he shared in award of the Nobel Peace Prize to the IPCC in 2007. In 1999, he and USGS colleague David Wolock developed "WaterWatch", the Nation's first website depicting maps and graphs of water resources conditions in near real-time. Lins served as President of the World Meteorological Organization (WMO) Commission for Hydrology from 2012 to 2019.

From the early 1980s onward, Lins's research focused principally on characterizing the surface water response to climate, with an emphasis on regional streamflow variability, long-term trends, and the statistical techniques appropriate for such analyses. Lins' most controversial research, which has not been fully embraced by the climate science community, suggests that the significance of climate trends may be greatly overstated because it does not consider the possibility that long-term persistence is a component of climatic variations.

Lins holds a B.S. in geography from the University of Maryland (1971), an M.S. in geography from the University of Delaware, (1978), and a Ph.D. in Environmental Sciences from the University of Virginia (1993). In 2021, he was awarded the International Hydrology Prize - Volker Medal by the International Association of Hydrological Sciences, UNESCO, and WMO.

== Selected publications ==
- "Comment on "Communicating Government Science," Eos, 87, 2 May 2006.
- "Natures style: naturally trendy," Geophysical Research Letters, 32, 2005.
- "Streamflow trends in the United States," Geophysical Research Letters, 26, 1999.
- "Regional streamflow regimes and hydroclimatology of the United States," Water Resources Research, 33, 1997.
