= John R. Falck =

American organic chemist

John Russell "Camille" Falck (born December 2, 1948) is an American chemist, Professor of Biochemistry, and holder of the Robert A. Welch Distinguish Chair in Chemistry at the University of Texas Southwestern Medical Center (UT SW Medical Center). In 1996 he was awarded the Wilfred T. Doherty Recognition Award from the Dallas-Fort Worth Section of the American Chemical Society and a Recognition Award at the March 10, 2002, Winter Eicosanoid Conference (Baltimore MD) in appreciation of his significant contributions to the chemistry of natural products, and to the identification and functional characterization of the cytochrome P450 (P450) arachidonic acid (AA) monooxygenase metabolic pathway and its metabolites.

== Early life and career ==
Falck was born in the then US territory of Alaska, married Elaine R. Fogel (died 9/2008), and has two sons Benjamin and Aaron. He earned a BSc and PhD in organic chemistry from Colorado State University in 1970 and 1973, and a Diploma of Imperial College (DIC), London, England. After postdoctoral studies with Nobel laureates Derek H. R. Barton (Imperial College, London) and Elias J. Corey (Harvard University, MA) he joined the faculty at the then University of Texas Health Science Center (now UT SW Medical Center) in 1979. Falck has authored more than 820 peer-reviewed publications and awarded 40 patents.

== Scientific contributions ==
=== P450 AA monooxygenases ===
Following initial reports of AA metabolism by P450 enzymes, Falck completed the first structural characterization and synthesis of 5,6-, 8,9-, 11,12- and 14,15-epoxyeicosatrienoic acids (EETs) and of 19- and 20-hydroxyeicosatetraenoic acids (19- and 20-HETEs), and characterized them as products of the epoxygenase and ω/ω-1 hydroxylase branches of the P450 AA Monooxygenase, respectively. These synthetic achievements were followed by Falck's early contributions to the: a) development of analytical methods for the identification of EETs and 19- and 20-HETE as products of endogenous metabolism of AA by P450 enzymes, b) establishment of the P450 AA Monooxygenase as a branch of the AA metabolic cascade, and c) characterization of biological activities associated with many of the P450 metabolites. These accomplishments, highlighted in independent reviews, were followed by Falck's development of synthetic EET and 20-HETE functional analogs/antagonists, which were of critical importance during the subsequent characterization of physiological and pathophysiological roles for these enzymes and their metabolites.

=== Total syntheses ===
Falck is known for his application of efficient, eco-friendly chemical procedures and/or strategies during the synthesis of a wide range of drug candidates, several of which are currently undergoing clinical evaluation. He has also confirmed the structures of several bioactive compounds found in natural products, and of short-lived intracellular second messengers that mediated cellular responses to environmental stimuli.

=== Development of chemical and biochemical techniques and tools ===
Falck's contributions range from practical methods for creating carbon-carbon, carbon-nitrogen, and carbon-oxygen bonds to the visualization of acidic organelles inside cells.
