= Water Resources Research =

- Discipline: Hydrology, water resources
- Language: English
- Edited by: Georgia (Gia) Destouni

Publication details
- History: 1965–present
- Publisher: American Geophysical Union (United States)
- Frequency: Monthly
- Impact factor: 4.6 (2023)

Standard abbreviations
- ISO 4: Water Resour. Res.

Indexing
- CODEN: WRERAQ
- ISSN: 0043-1397 (print); 1944-7973 (web)
- LCCN: 68006884
- OCLC no.: 01171541

Links
- Journal homepage

Water Resources Research is a peer-reviewed scientific journal published by the American Geophysical Union, covering research in the social and natural sciences of water. The editor-in-chief is Georgia Destouni (Stockholm University), who took over from Martyn Clark (2017-2020).

According to the Journal Citation Reports, the journal has a 2020 impact factor of 5.240.

== History ==
Water Resources Research was begun in 1965, with Walter B. Langbein and Allen V. Kneese as its founding editors.
