= G. K. Warren Prize =

The G. K. Warren Prize is awarded by the U.S. National Academy of Sciences "for noteworthy and distinguished accomplishment in fluviatile geology and closely related aspects of the geological sciences." Named in honor of Gouverneur Kemble Warren, it was first awarded in 1969 and has been awarded every four years since 1982.

== List of G. K. Warren Prize winners ==
Source: NAS

Year	Recipient	Rationale
1969	Ralph A. Bagnold	for his outstanding contributions in fluvial geology
1973	Luna B. Leopold	for his contributions to the field of hydraulic geometry of rivers and his studies of the riverine environment
1976	Walter B. Langbein	for his significant advancement of hydrology and fluviatile geology through geophysics and mathematics
1982	John T. Hack	for his major contributions to understanding of form and characteristics of river channels as related to geologic stratigraphy
1986	Stanley A. Schumm	for his sound, insightful contributions to the role of fluvial processes in the evolution of slopes, stream channels, and sediment production, and their practical concerns to man
1990	John R. L. Allen	for his distinguished contributions to fluvial sedimentology and paleogeomorphology, which skillfully blends field studies of modern and ancient fluvial environments with laboratory experiments and mathematical modeling
1994	Claudio Vita-Finzi	for his distinguished contributions to fluvial morphology in relation to climate, tectonic activity, and human history (archaeological geology), on the basis of field investigations on several continents
1998	Thomas Dunne	for his field observations as the basis for detailed theoretical analyses of many hydro-geomorphological problems, including surface erosion, snow-melt runoff, sediment budgets for small plots, and great rivers, including the Amazon
2002	Gary Parker	for rigorous analysis based on fundamental physical principles and laboratory experiments markedly advancing our understanding of sediment transport, river morphology, and channel behavior
2006	Michael A. Church	for his extensive and innovative field and laboratory studies of the morphology and dynamics of natural and managed river channels at a range of scales
2010	Alan D. Howard	for his seminal contributions on the theory of fluvial erosion, sedimentation, and landscape evolution
2014	Kelin X. Whipple	for his seminal studies on the role of fluvial incision as a key process that links climate, tectonics, and landscape evolution
2019	Kay Behrensmeyer	For her contributions to understanding fluvial processes, how they are expressed in the rock record, and how they shape our understanding of ecological change throughout the history of life on land

== See also ==
- List of geology awards
- Prizes named after people
