= Cupeyville School =

Co-educational college preparatory institution located in San Juan, Puerto Rico

- Cupeyville School
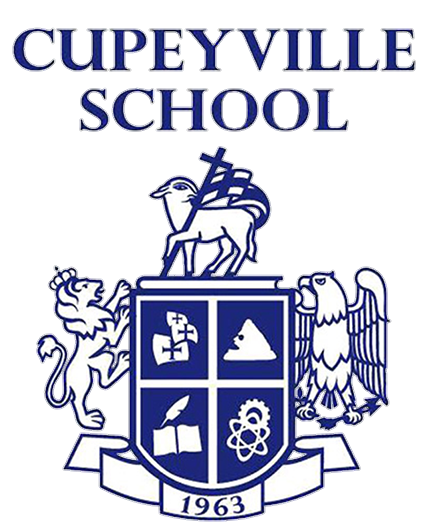

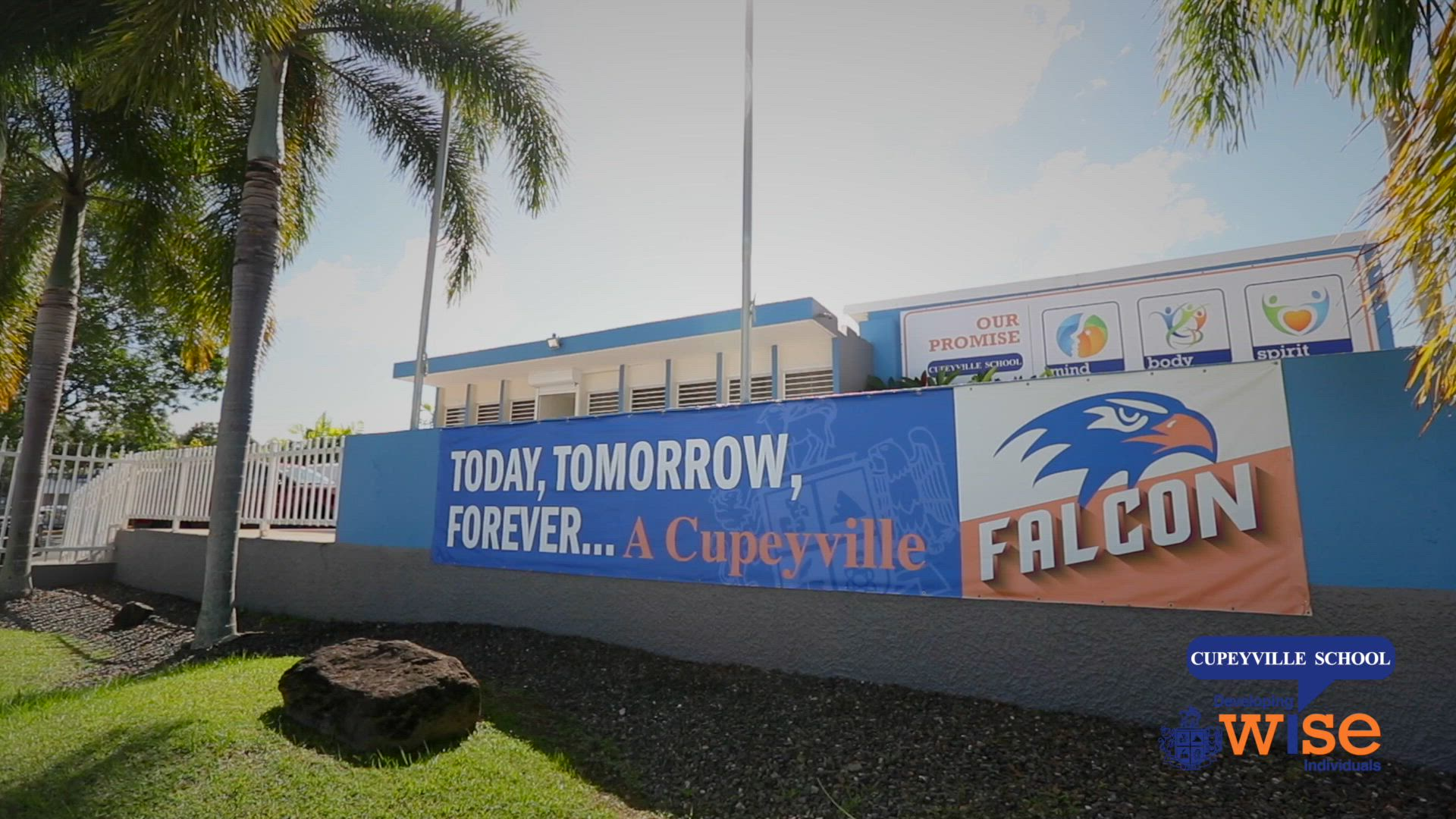

Location
- Río Piedras, San Juan, Puerto Rico; 18.373556°N 66.046540°W

Information
- Type: Private College-Preparatory elementary, middle, and high school.
- Motto: Developing WISE Individuals
- Established: 1963
- Founder: Ana Pagan
- Grades: PPK–12
- Enrollment: over 900
- Colors: Blue, Orange
- Mascot: Falcon
- Nickname: Cupeyville Falcons
- Accreditation: Middle States Association of Colleges and Secondary Schools, Licensed by the General Council of Higher Education of the Commonwealth of Puerto Rico, recognized as a School of Excellence by the U.S. Department of Education, Blue Ribbon School of Excellence
- Website: www.cupeyvilleschool.org

Cupeyville School, founded in 1963, is a small, private, non-sectarian, co-educational college preparatory institution located in Río Piedras, San Juan, Puerto Rico.

The school is accredited by the Middle States Association, the Department of Education of Puerto Rico, and C.A.D.I.E. It is the only accredited school in Puerto Rico in hands of a Puerto Rican family.

== Academic programs ==
Classes are divided into three programs: Regular, Bridges (for students needing more attention), and Advanced (Honor).

- English
- Spanish
- Math (Arithmetic, Pre-Algebra, Algebra I, Algebra II, Geometry, Pre-Calculus, AP Calculus)
- Science (Elementary, Life, Earth, Physics, Biology, Chemistry, AP classes)
- History (Puerto Rican, Latin American, World History, U.S. History, American History)
- Physical Education
- Home Economics
- Art
- Mosaic
- Music
- Writing
- Dance
- Health
- Computer
- College Board Preparation
- Counseling

== Clubs ==
=== Elementary school ===
- Art
- Audio Visual
- Chess
- Chimes
- Choir boys
- Choir girls
- Drama
- Falcon News
- Flute
- Mosaic
- Origami
- Readers
- Recycle

=== Middle and high school ===
- Dance
- English Club
- Environmental
- Falcon Chronicles
- Forensics
- Info
- Italian
- Math
- Model United Nations (U.N.)
- Music (choir, bells & chimes)
- Pandora
- Reading
- Science
- Dean's Student Security
- Sharing Hearts
- Spanish - Middle School Only (Club de Español)
- Spanish Club - High School Only (Círculo de Español)
- Spanish Oratory (Oratoria)
- Photography

== Memberships and affiliations ==
- College Board
- National Association of College Admissions Counselors
- Caribbean Counselors Association
- Asociación Puertorriqueña de Orientación
- National Association of Secondary School Principals
- National Association of Elementary School Principals
- Association for Supervision and Curriculum Development
- National Council of Teachers of Mathematics
- TESOL
- International Reading Association
- National Come Libro Society
- National Junior Honor Society
- Association of Private Education of Puerto Rico
- P.R. High School Athletic Alliance

== Notable alumni ==
- Héctor Villanueva, major league baseball player who won the Triple Crown
- Enrique Vivoni, Puerto Rican scientist and engineer specializing in hydrology
- Mariana Vicente, model and Miss Universe Puerto Rico 2010
