= James Fienup =

American scientist and physicist

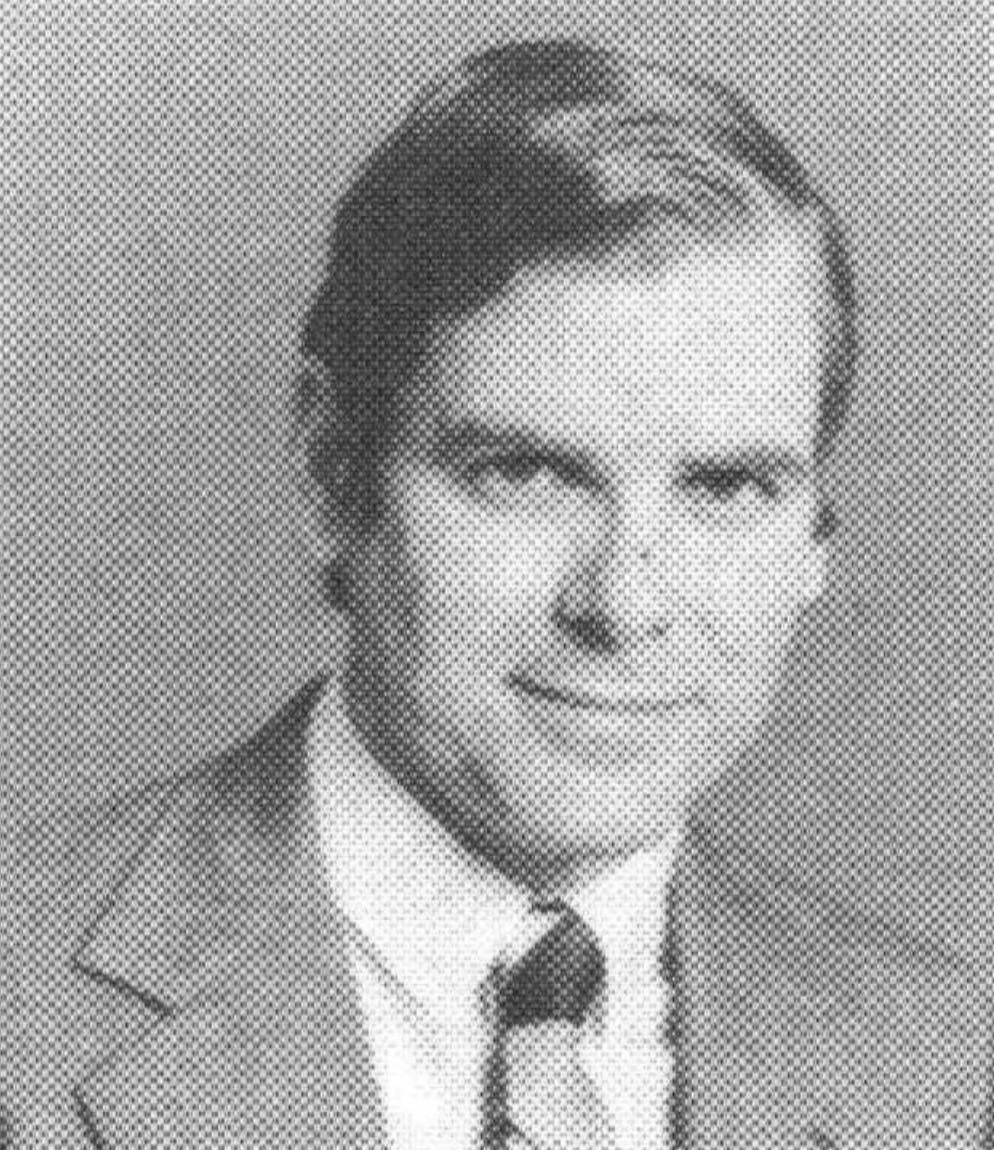
- Fienup in 1986
- Born: April 17, 1948 (age 78); St. Louis, Missouri, U.S.
- Education: College of the Holy Cross (BA); Stanford University (MS, PhD)
- Scientific career
- Fields: Applied physics
- Workplaces: University of Rochester
- Thesis: Improved synthesis and computational methods for computer-generated holograms (1975)
- Doctoral advisor: Joseph W. Goodman

James Ray Fienup (born April 17, 1948) is an American optical scientist and applied physicist. He is the Robert E. Hopkins Professor of Optics at the Institute of Optics of the University of Rochester, where he researches imaging science. Fienup was the editor-in-chief of the Journal of the Optical Society of America from 1998 to 2003.

== Early life and education ==
Fienup was born in St. Louis, Missouri, on April 17, 1948. After being educated at St. Louis University High School, he attended the College of the Holy Cross, where he graduated in 1970 with a Bachelor of Arts (B.A.), magna cum laude, in physics and mathematics. Fienup then pursued graduate studies at Stanford University as a fellow for the National Science Foundation.

In 1972, Fienup obtained a Master of Science (M.S.) from Stanford in applied physics and then earned his Ph.D. in applied physics from Stanford in 1975. His doctoral dissertation was titled, "Improved synthesis and computational methods for computer-generated holograms". His doctoral advisor was the physicist Joseph W. Goodman.

== Career ==
After serving as a research assistant at the Stanford Electronics Laboratories, Fienup became a senior scientist at the Environmental Research Institute of Michigan in July 1975. He remained there until June 2002, when he assumed a position at the University of Rochester as its Robert E. Hopkins Professor of Optics.

Fienup is a member of the National Academy of Engineering and a fellow of Optica. He received the Emmett N. Leith Medal in 2013, "for the integration of optics and digital systems as demonstrated in pioneering contributions to phase retrieval, image restoration, wavefront sensing and computational imaging." He is also a member of the Society of Photo-Optical Instrumentation Engineers (SPIE) and the Institute of Electrical and Electronics Engineers (IEEE).
