= Luna Leopold =

Geomorphologist and hydrologist

Luna Bergere Leopold
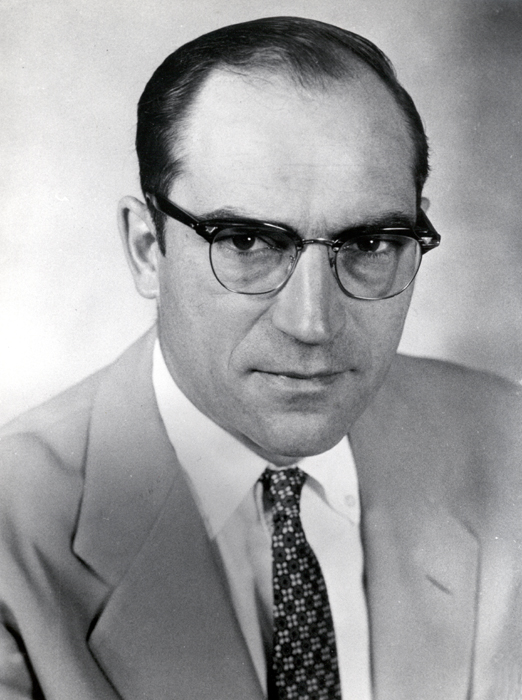
- Leopold, c. 1971
- Born: October 8, 1915; Albuquerque, New Mexico
- Died: February 23, 2006 (aged 90); Berkeley, California
- Education: University of Wisconsin–Madison, University of California, Los Angeles, Harvard University
- Parent: Aldo Leopold
- Scientific career
- Fields: geomorphology, hydrology

Luna Bergere Leopold (October 8, 1915 – February 23, 2006) was a leading U.S. geomorphologist and hydrologist, and son of Aldo Leopold. He received a B.S. in civil engineering from the University of Wisconsin in 1936; an M.S. in physics-meteorology from the University of California, Los Angeles in 1944; and a Ph.D. in geology from Harvard University in 1950.

Leopold is widely known in his primary field for his work in fluvial geomorphology and for the book, Fluvial Processes in Geomorphology, that he wrote with Gordon Wolman and John Miller.

Leopold suggested that a new philosophy of water management is needed, one based on geologic, geographic, and climatic factors as well as traditional economic, social, and political factors. He argued that the management of water resources cannot be successful as long as it is naïvely perceived from an economic and political standpoint, as it is in the status quo.

== Career ==
From 1937 to 1940, Leopold worked as an engineer for the U.S. Soil Conservation Service in New Mexico. In 1940, he enlisted and was a part of the U.S. Army Weather Service and the Army Air Force. He was in the Army until 1946 and he rose from the rank of Private to Captain.

From 1946 to 1950, Leopold served as the Chief Meteorologist of the Pineapple Research Institute, Hawaii. In 1950, he joined the U.S. Geological Survey. He worked for the USGS until 1972 serving as Hydraulic Engineer (1950–56), Chief Hydrologist (1956–66), and Senior Research Hydrologist (1966–72). During his tenure as Chief Hydrologist he made lasting changes in the conduct of hydrology in the USGS. He unified the field offices of the Water Resources Division from being identified as surface water, groundwater, or quality of water offices and formed single district offices, one for each state. He also created the National Research Program of the Water Resources Division. In addition he promoted the importance of USGS working on the important and controversial topics such as land use change, flood control, water pollution, and groundwater development.

In 1972, Leopold joined the faculty of the University of California, Berkeley as a professor in the Department of Geology and Geophysics and Department of Landscape Architecture. He retired in 1986 and continued as a Professor Emeritus until his death in 2006.

== Awards and honors ==
- 1958 - Recipient of the first Kirk Bryan Award of the Geological Society of America (with Thomas J. Maddock, Jr.)
- 1967 - Elected to the United States National Academy of Sciences
- 1968 - Recipient of the Cullum Geographical Medal of the American Geographical Society
- 1971 - Elected to the American Academy of Arts and Sciences
- 1972 - President of The Geological Society of America
- 1972 - Elected to the American Philosophical Society
- 1973 - Recipient of the G. K. Warren Prize from the National Academy of Sciences.
- 1980 - Honorary Doctorate from the University of Wisconsin
- 1981 - Honorary Doctorate from the University of St. Andrews, Scotland
- 1983 - Awarded the Busk Medal by the Royal Geographical Society.
- 1988 - Honorary Doctorate from the University of Murcia
- 1991 - Awarded the National Medal of Science.
- 1992 - Awarded the Robert E. Horton Medal
- 1994 - Awarded the Penrose Medal
- 1994 - Awarded the Joan Hodges Queneau Palladium Medal
- 2006 - Awarded The Benjamin Franklin Medal in Earth Science

== Books by Luna Leopold ==
- Leopold, Luna B. (1966). Water (Series: LIFE Science Library), Time Incorp, ISBN B000GQO9SM.
- Leopold, Aldo and Leopold, Luna B. (editor) (1972, reprint). Round River. Oxford University Press, USA. ISBN 0-19-501563-0.
- Leopold, Luna B. (1974). Water: A Primer. W H Freeman & Co. ISBN 0-7167-0263-0.
- Dunne, Thomas and Luna B. Leopold (1978). Water in Environmental Planning. W. H. Freeman & Co. ISBN 0-7167-0079-4.
- Leopold, Luna B. (1966, reprinted 1981). Water, Life Science Library, Time Life Education. ISBN 0-8094-4075-X.
- Leopold, Luna B.; Wolman, M. Gordon; and Miller, John P. (1995). Fluvial Processes in Geomorphology. Dover Publications. ISBN 0-486-68588-8.
- Leopold, Luna B. (1997). Water, Rivers and Creeks. University Science Books. ISBN 0-935702-98-9.
- Leopold, Luna B. (2006, reprint). A View of the River. Harvard University Press; New Ed edition. ISBN 0-674-01845-1.

== Other sources ==
- The San Francisco Chronicle, 3/3/2006
- New York Times, 3/20/2006
- EOS 3/19/2019,
- The Virtual Luna Leopold Project
- Association of Engineering Societies website
