= Gabriel Eckstein =

American lawyer

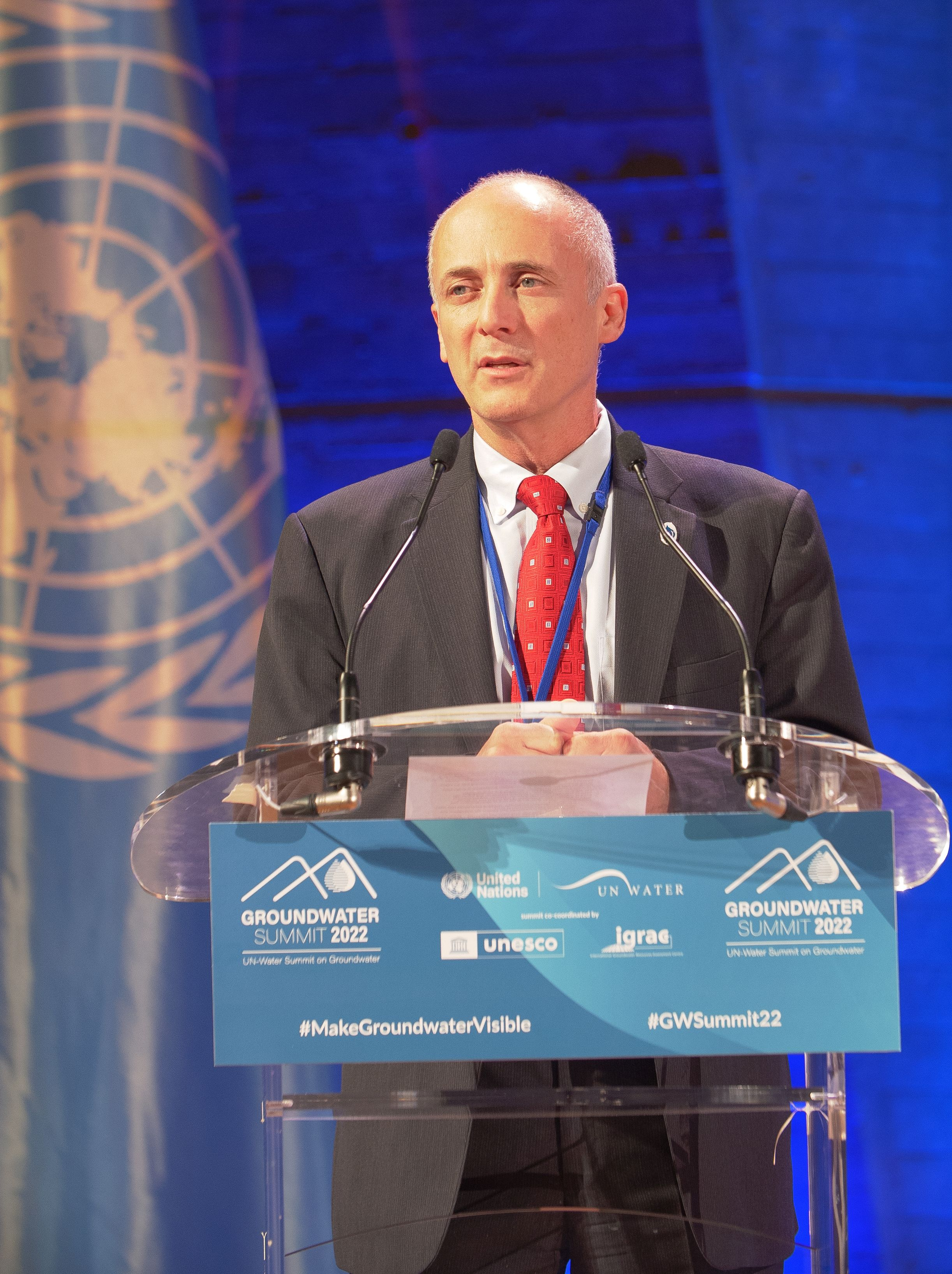
Gabriel Eckstein speaking at the UN Groundwater Summit held in Paris, France in December 2022

Gabriel E. Eckstein is an Israeli-born lawyer and professor at the Texas A&M University School of Law. His work focuses on water and environmental law and policy at the local, national, and international spheres. He is particularly known for his work addressing laws, regulations, and policies for managing transboundary freshwater resources, and especially the international law of transboundary groundwater resources. From 2017 until 2022, Eckstein represented the Plurinational State of Bolivia in its case against Chile in the Dispute over the Status and Use of the Waters of the Silala, and appeared before the International Court of Justice in April 2022.

Eckstein has served as an adviser for numerous national and intergovernmental organizations, including the U.S. Agency for International Development, World Bank, UN International Law Commission, UN Food and Agriculture Organization, UNESCO, and Organization of American States. Since 2011, Eckstein has served on the Executive Council of the International Association of Water Law. Between 2019 and 2022, he served as president of the International Water Resources Association (IWRA). Prior to that, he served as IWRA's Treasurer from 2010 to 2015. In addition, he has served as associate editor for Brill Research Perspectives: International Water Law, and on the Editorial Board of Lawtext Publishing's Journal of Water Law since 2014.

Eckstein joined the Texas A&M University School of Law faculty in 2013. He now also holds the following academic affiliations at Texas A&M University: associated professor in the Public Service and Administration Department and research fellow with the Institute for Science, Technology and Public Policy at the Bush School of Government and Public Service; graduate faculty member for the Texas A&M Water Management and Hydrological Science program; and affiliated faculty with the Texas A&M Energy Institute. From 2010 to 2013, he taught at the Texas Wesleyan University School of Law in 2010, before it was acquired by Texas A&M University. Prior to that, Eckstein was at the Texas Tech University School of Law where he taught as an associate professor from 2003, and was later appointed the George W. McCleskey Chair in Water Law in 2006.

Born in Israel and raised in Israel and the U.S., Eckstein studied geology and international relations at Kent State University before pursuing a master's degree in international affairs at Florida State University. Eckstein completed a Juris Doctor followed by a Master of Law in international environmental law at American University Washington College of Law. Eckstein is licensed to practice law in New York and maintains an inactive law license in West Virginia and Washington, D.C.
