= Claudio Vita-Finzi =

Australian-British academic

Claudio Vita-Finzi, FBA, FRGS (born 21 November 1936) is an Australian-British geologist and academic. He was Professor of Neotectonics at University College London from 1987 to 2001, and has been a scientific associate at the Natural History Museum, London since 2001. His research is interdisciplinary, and involves the application of tectonics and planetary science on landscape change: this has led to him working alongside archaeologists and climatologists among others. He studied at St John's College, Cambridge.

== Honours ==
Vita-Finzi is the recipient of two medals from the Royal Geographical Society: the Back Award in 1971, and the Busk Medal in 2012 "for fieldwork on Mediterranean landscape change". In 1994, he was awarded the G. K. Warren Prize by the United States National Academy of Sciences "for his distinguished contributions to fluvial morphology in relation to climate, tectonic activity, and human history (archaeological geology), on the basis of field investigations on several continents". He was elected to the American Philosophical Society in 1997. In 2012, he was elected a Fellow of the British Academy (FBA), the United Kingdom's national academy for the humanities and social sciences.

== Selected works ==
- Vita-Finzi, Claudio (1969). The Mediterranean Valleys: Geological Changes in Historical Times. Cambridge: Cambridge University Press. ISBN 978-0521073554.
- Vita-Finzi, Claudio (1978). Archaeological Sites in Their Setting. London: Thames and Hudson. ISBN 978-0500020906.
- Vita-Finzi, Claudio (1986). Recent Earth Movements: An Introduction to Neotectonics. London: Academic Press. ISBN 0-12-722370-3.
- Vita-Finzi, Claudio (2005). Planetary Geology: An Introduction. Terra Publishing. ISBN 978-1903544204.
- Vita-Finzi, Claudio (2012). Solar History: An Introduction. London: Springer. ISBN 978-9400742949.
- Vita-Finzi, Claudio (2018). The Sun: A User's Manual. London: Springer. ISBN 978-1402068805.
