= Peter S. Eagleson =

American hydrologist (1928–2021)

- Born: February 27, 1928; Philadelphia, Pennsylvania
- Died: January 6, 2021 (aged 92)
- Education: B.S. 1949, M.S. 1952, Lehigh University; Sc.D. 1956, Massachusetts Institute of Technology
- Known for: Integrating hydrology and ecology to redefine hydrology
- Scientific career
- Fields: Hydrology, Environmental Engineering
- Doctoral advisor: Arthur T. Ippen
- Doctoral students: Dara Entekhabi

Peter S. Eagleson (February 27, 1928 – January 6, 2021) was an American hydrologist, author of Dynamic Hydrology and Ecohydrology: Darwinian Expression of Vegetation Form and Function. He taught at the Massachusetts Institute of Technology since 1952 and was a Professor Emeritus. He held professional positions including member of the National Academy of Engineering (since 1982) and President of the American Geophysical Union from 1986-1988. He won many awards including the Stockholm International Water Institute's World Water Prize in 1997.

== Early life ==
Peter was born in 1928 in Philadelphia to Helen (née Sturges) and William Boal Eagleson and attended Lehigh University in Bethlehem, Pennsylvania. At Lehigh he overlapped with his older brother, Bill, and was called for active duty with the US Army Corps of Engineers following graduation in 1949. He later returned to Lehigh for a master's degree in engineering, focused on hydraulics, and was recruited there by Arthur Ippen to join MIT's new hydrodynamics laboratory (now the Parsons Laboratory for Environmental Science and Engineering). He joined the MIT faculty as an instructor in 1954, became an assistant professor in 1955, and completed his Sc.D. a year later in 1956 with a dissertation on shoaling waves.

== Career ==
Eagleson's research interests include dynamic hydrology, hydroclimatology, and forest ecology. His early research was on sediment transport and wave theory. He published multiple articles and book chapters about these subjects. It was not until 1964 that he significantly narrowed his focus to hydrology. In 1978 Eagleson published seven papers on climate, soil, and vegetation in a single issue of Water Resources Research, decades prior to the emergence of the field of ecohydrology. These papers immediately impacted the field of hydrology.

Eagleson chaired the 1991 National Research Council committee that published the Opportunities in Hydrological Sciences report, which established hydrology as a critical pillar of geoscience and Earth system science and led to the creation of the National Science Foundation’s Hydrologic Sciences Program.

Eagleson has taught at MIT since 1952, holding a chair as Professor of Civil and Environmental Engineering since 1965.

The Peter S. Eagleson Lecture in Hydrological Sciences was established by the Consortium of Universities for the Advancement of Hydrologic Sciences in 2008 in his honor.

== Awards ==
- John Dalton Medal (European Geosciences Union) 1999
- World Water Prize (Stockholm International Water Institute) 1997
- William Bowie Medal 1994
- James R. Killian Faculty Achievement Award, MIT 1992-1993
- International Hydrology Prize 1991
- Robert E. Horton Medal 1988

== Selected publications ==
- Eagleson, P.S. 2004. Ecohydrology. Darwinian Expression of Vegetation Form and Function. Cambridge University Press.
- Eagleson, P.S. 1970. Dynamic hydrology. McGraw-Hill.
- Eagleson, P.S. 1978. Climate, Soil, and Vegetation: 1. Introduction to Water Balance Dynamics. Water Resources Research, 14(5), 705–712. https://doi.org/10.1029/WR014i005p00705
- Eagleson, P.S. 1978. Climate, Soil, and Vegetation: 2. The Distribution of Annual Precipitation Derived from Observed Storm Sequences. Water Resources Research, 14(5), 713–721. https://doi.org/10.1029/WR014i005p00713
- Eagleson, P.S. 1978. Climate, Soil, and Vegetation: 3. A Simplified Model of Soil Moisture Movement in the Liquid Phase. Water Resources Research, 14(5), 722–730. https://doi.org/10.1029/WR014i005p00722
- Eagleson, P.S. 1978. Climate, Soil, and Vegetation: 4. The Expected Value of Annual Evapotranspiration. Water Resources Research, 14(5), 731–739. https://doi.org/10.1029/WR014i005p00731
- Eagleson, P.S. 1978. Climate, Soil, and Vegetation: 5. A Derived Distribution of Storm Surface Runoff. Water Resources Research, 14(5), 741–748. https://doi.org/10.1029/WR014i005p00741
- Eagleson, P.S. 1978. Climate, Soil, and Vegetation: 6. Dynamics of the Annual Water Balance. Water Resources Research, 14(5), 749. https://doi.org/10.1029/WR014i005p00749
- Eagleson, P.S. 1978. Climate, Soil, and Vegetation: 7. A Derived Distribution of Annual Water Yield. Water Resources Research, 14(5), 765. https://doi.org/10.1029/WR014i005p00765
