= Ven Te Chow =

- Born: October 7, 1919; Hangzhou, China
- Died: July 30, 1981 (aged 61)
- Education: National Chiao Tung University (B.S.) Pennsylvania State University (M.S.) University of Illinois (Ph.D.)
- Occupations: Professor of Civil and Hydrosystems Engineering
- Known for: Watershed experimentation systems and watershed hydraulics.

Ven Te Chow (周文德; October 7, 1919, Hangzhou, China, – July 30, 1981), was a Chinese-American engineer. He was a widely recognized hydrologist and hydraulic engineer, acclaimed for his contributions to hydrology and water resources development.

== Career ==
He was a professor of Civil and Hydrosystems Engineering at the University of Illinois at Urbana-Champaign. He received his B.S. degree in civil engineering from the National Chiao Tung University in 1940, his M.S. degree in engineering mechanics from Pennsylvania State University in 1948, and his Ph.D. degree in hydraulic engineering from the University of Illinois in 1950.

Chow joined the faculty of the University of Illinois in the Department of Civil Engineering in 1948 and became a naturalized U.S. citizen in 1962. Some of his unusual contributions include his watershed experimentation system, which produced storms in the laboratory using sophisticated electronic, pneumatic, and sonar controls. At the time it was one of the most sophisticated laboratories in the world for physical hydrology and attracted worldwide attention and interest among scientists, engineers, and the public. It was the subject of an article that appeared in Life magazine on June 6, 1969, and was also addressed in the 1969 March issue of Public Works magazine.

=== IWRA ===
With this unique instrumentation, he introduced a new field of technology known as watershed hydraulics. He also developed a formula for hydrologic frequency drainage design, a method of backwater curve computation.

Chow was the founder and first president of the International Water Resources Association (IWRA). Under Ven Te Chow's leadership, the IWRA began publishing the academic journal Water International in 1975. Over the last 49 years, IWRA has actively promoted the sustainable management of water resources around the globe and become one of the most influential organizations in the field of water.

The IWRA Ven Te Chow Memorial Award was created by the IWRA in his memory. The award includes a lecture, to be delivered at its triennial World Water Congresses.

Recipients of the Ven Te Chow Memorial Award
Year	Recipient
1988	Vujica M. Yevjevich
1991	Malin Falkenmark
1994	Andras Szollosi-Nagy
1996	Ben Chie Yen
1997	Glenn E. Stout
2000	Janusz Kindler
2003	Asit K. Biswas
2005	Benedito Braga
2008	John Pigram
2011	Peter H. Gleick
2015	Rabi Mohtar
2017	V. P. Singh and William N. Lehrer
2020	Soontak Lee

The American Society of Civil Engineers established the Ven Te Chow Award in his memory to recognize the lifetime achievements in the field of hydrologic engineering. The award is administered by the Surface Water Hydrology Technical Committee of the Environmental and Water Resources Institute (EWRI). The award ceremony and lecture are held at annual World Environmental & Water Resources Congress.

Recipients of ASCE/EWRI Ven Te Chow Award
Year	Recipient
2022	Gary Brunner
2021	George Kuczera
2020	Richard M. Vogel
2019	Rao S. Govindaraju
2018	Keith W. Hipel
2017	Soroosh Sorooshian
2016	Larry W. Mays
2015	Richard H. McCuen
2014	Jery R. Stedinger
2013	Slobadan P. Simonovic
2012	Ramachandra Rao
2011	David Maidment
2010	Jose D. Salas
2009	M. Levent Kavvas
2008	Stephen J. Burges
2007	Leo R. Beard
2006	David R. Dawdy
2005	Vijay P. Singh
2004	Norman H. Crawford
2003	Jacques W. Delleur
2002	Ignacio Rodriguez-Iturbe
2001	Robert A. Clark
2000	James E. Nash
1999	Vit Klemes
1998	James C. I. Dooge
1997	Vujica Yevjevich

== Works ==
- Ven Te Chow (1959). Open-channel hydraulics. McGraw-Hill. OCLC 4010975.
