= Thomas Dunne (geologist) =

British geomorphologist and hydrologist

- Born: April 21, 1943 (age 83)
- Education: Cambridge University, Johns Hopkins University
- Known for: Fluvial geomorphology
- Awards: G. K. Warren Prize (1998); Robert E. Horton Medal (2016)
- Scientific career
- Fields: Geomorphology, Hydrology
- Workplaces: University of California, Santa Barbara

Thomas Dunne (born April 21, 1943) is a British geomorphologist and hydrologist who is a professor at the University of California, Santa Barbara's Bren School of Environmental Science & Management and Department of Earth Science since 1995. From 1973 to 1995 he was a professor at the University of Washington's Department of Geological Sciences where his research focused on landslides.

His degrees are in physical geography, obtaining a B.A. from Cambridge University in 1964, and a Ph.D. in 1969 from The Johns Hopkins University. He is the coauthor, with Luna Leopold, of Water in Environmental Planning.
