= Joseph W. Goodman =

American electrical engineer and physicist

Joseph Goodman
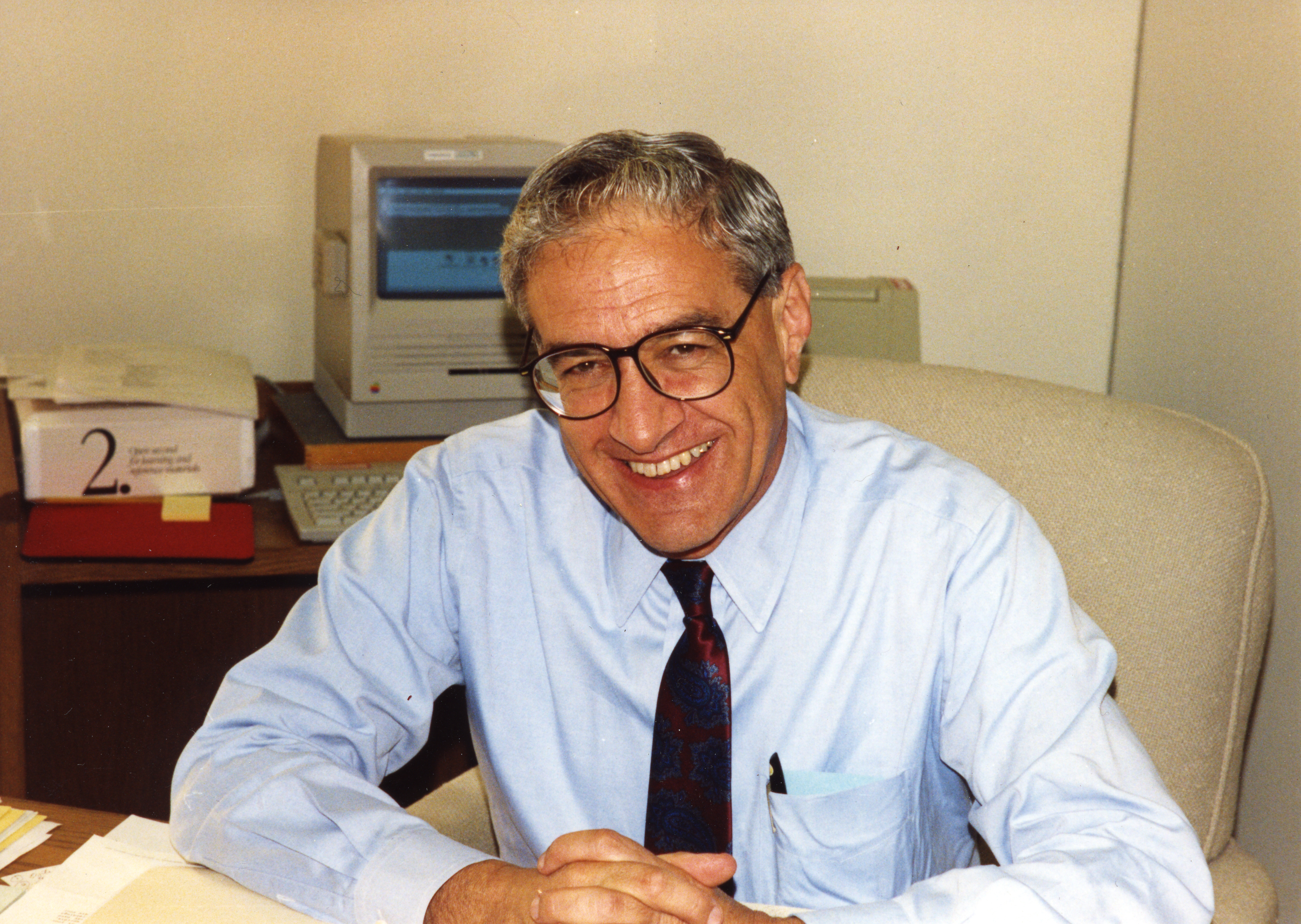
- Born: Joseph Wilfred Goodman
- Education: Harvard University (BA); Stanford University (MS, PhD)
- Awards: IEEE James H. Mulligan, Jr. Education Medal (1987); SPIE Gold Medal (2007)
- Scientific career
- Fields: Optics
- Workplaces: Stanford University
- Thesis: A study of some complex countermeasure signals and their compatibility (1963)
- Doctoral students: Albert Macovski; James Fienup; Kristina M. Johnson

Joseph Wilfred Goodman is an American electrical engineer and physicist.

== Education ==
Goodman received a Bachelor of Arts degree in engineering and applied physics from Harvard University in 1958 and Master of Science and Ph.D. degrees in electrical engineering from Stanford University in 1960 and 1963, respectively.

== Career and research ==
Goodman has held a number of positions in the field of optics, including the presidency of the Optical Society of America in 1992.

From 1958 through 1962, he was a research assistant in the Stanford Electronics Laboratories. During 1962 and 1963, he was a postdoctoral fellow at the Norwegian Defense Research Establishment, under the auspices of the Royal Norwegian Society for Scientific and Industrial Research. He returned to Stanford in 1963 as a research associate, a position he held until 1967. In 1967, he was appointed assistant professor of electrical engineering at Stanford. He was promoted to associate professor in 1969 and to professor in 1972. In 1988, he was appointed chairman of the department of electrical engineering and named the William E. Ayer Professor of Electrical Engineering. In 1996, he stepped down as chairman and assumed the position senior associate dean for faculty and academic affairs in the school of engineering. For the duration of the summer of 1999, he was the acting dean of engineering. Goodman assumed emeritus status on January 1, 2000.

During the academic year 1973–1974, he was a visiting professor at the Institut d'Optique, Orsay, France. In the summer of 1984, he was the William Girling Watson Traveling Scholar at Sydney University, Sydney, Australia.

=== Academic and professional positions ===
Goodman has held several positions of responsibility in the optics community. For the Optical Society of America, he has served as a traveling lecturer, as vice chairman and chairman of the Technical Group on information processing, as a member of the technical council, as a member and chairman of the Fellows Committee, and as a member of the Ives Award Committee. He was elected a director-at-large of the OSA for the years 1972–1974; he also served on the board of directors ex officio while he was chairman of the publications committee, and while he was editor of the Journal of the Optical Society of America (1978–1983). He was elected vice president of the OSA for 1990, served as president-elect in 1991, president in 1992, and past president in 1993.

For the Society of Photo-Optical Instrumentation Engineers, he was elected to the board of governors for the years 1980–1982 and has served as a member and chairman of the awards committee, as a member of the nominating committee, and as a member of the technical council. He also served a second term as a governor of the society for the years 1988–1990.

For the Institute of Electrical and Electronics Engineers, he chaired an ad hoc committee on Optical and Electro-Optical Systems in 1969, has served on the editorial board of the Proceedings of the I.E.E.E. for the years 1979 and 1980, has been a member of the Education Medal Committee for 1987–1989, and a member of the Simon Ramo Medal Committee for the years 2003–2006.

His international activities include membership on the program committees of several international optics meetings. He was a member of the U.S. delegations to the first and second U.S.–Japan Seminars on optical data processing and holography, and a member of the U.S. delegation to the first U.S.–U.S.S.R seminar on optical data processing. In 1979 he chaired the U.S delegation to the first U.S.-Argentina seminar on Fourier Optics. In 1984, he was elected to a three-year term as vice president of the International Commission for Optics (ICO), a commission affiliated with the International Union for Pure and Applied Physics (IUPAP). He served as president of the ICO for a term 1988–1990, and past president for 1991–1993.

Goodman is a Fellow of the OSA, the IEEE, and the SPIE. In 1971, he was chosen the recipient of the Frederick Emmons Terman Award of the American Society for Engineering Education. He received the 1983 Max Born Award of the Optical Society of America for his contributions to physical optics, and in particular to holography, synthetic aperture optics, image processing, and speckle theory. He received the 1987 IEEE Education Medal for his contributions to Electrical Engineering education, the 1987 Dennis Gabor Award of the International Optical Engineering Society (SPIE) for his contributions to holography, optical processing and optical computing, the 1995 Esther Hoffman Beller Medal of the OSA, and the 1990 Frederic Ives Medal, the highest award of the Optical Society of America. In 2018 he was elected one of 16 Honorary Members of the OSA. In 2007, he received the SPIE Gold Medal, the highest award of that society, and in 2009 he was named the winner of the Emmett Leith Medal of the OSA. He was elected a member of the National Academy of Engineering in 1987, and a Fellow of American Academy of Arts and Sciences in 1996. Also in 1996, he received an honorary D.Sc. degree from the University of Alabama, and in 2012 he received an honorary D.Sc. degree from the St. Petersburg (Russia) the National Research University of Information Technologies, Mechanics and Optics. He is the author of approximately 220 technical publications, including the textbooks Introduction to Fourier Optics (1968, Second Edition 1996, Third Edition 2005, Fourth Edition 2017), Statistical Optics (1985, Second Edition 2015), Speckle Phenomena in Optics (2006, Second Edition 2020) and (with R.M. Gray) Fourier Transforms: An Introduction for Engineers (1995). His first full-length publication (Proc. I.E.E.E., Vol. 53, 1688 (1965)) was named a "Citation Classic" by the Institute for Scientific Information.

=== Business roles ===
Goodman has served as a director of several corporations, including Optivision, Inc. (of which he was a co-founder), ONI Systems (for which he was the founding chairman of the board), and E-TEK Dynamics. He served on the board of directors for Ondax, Inc. from its founding until December 2004, and as the chairman of the Board of Nanoprecision Products, Inc., a company he co-founded, until September 2006.

=== Lectures ===
- 1992 - Optical logic for subsystems Lecture sponsored by the Dept. of Electrical and Computer engineering, University of California, San Diego. Electrical and Computer Engineering Distinguished Lecture Series. Digital object made available by UC San Diego Library.
