= Rafael L. Bras =

Puerto Rican civil engineer

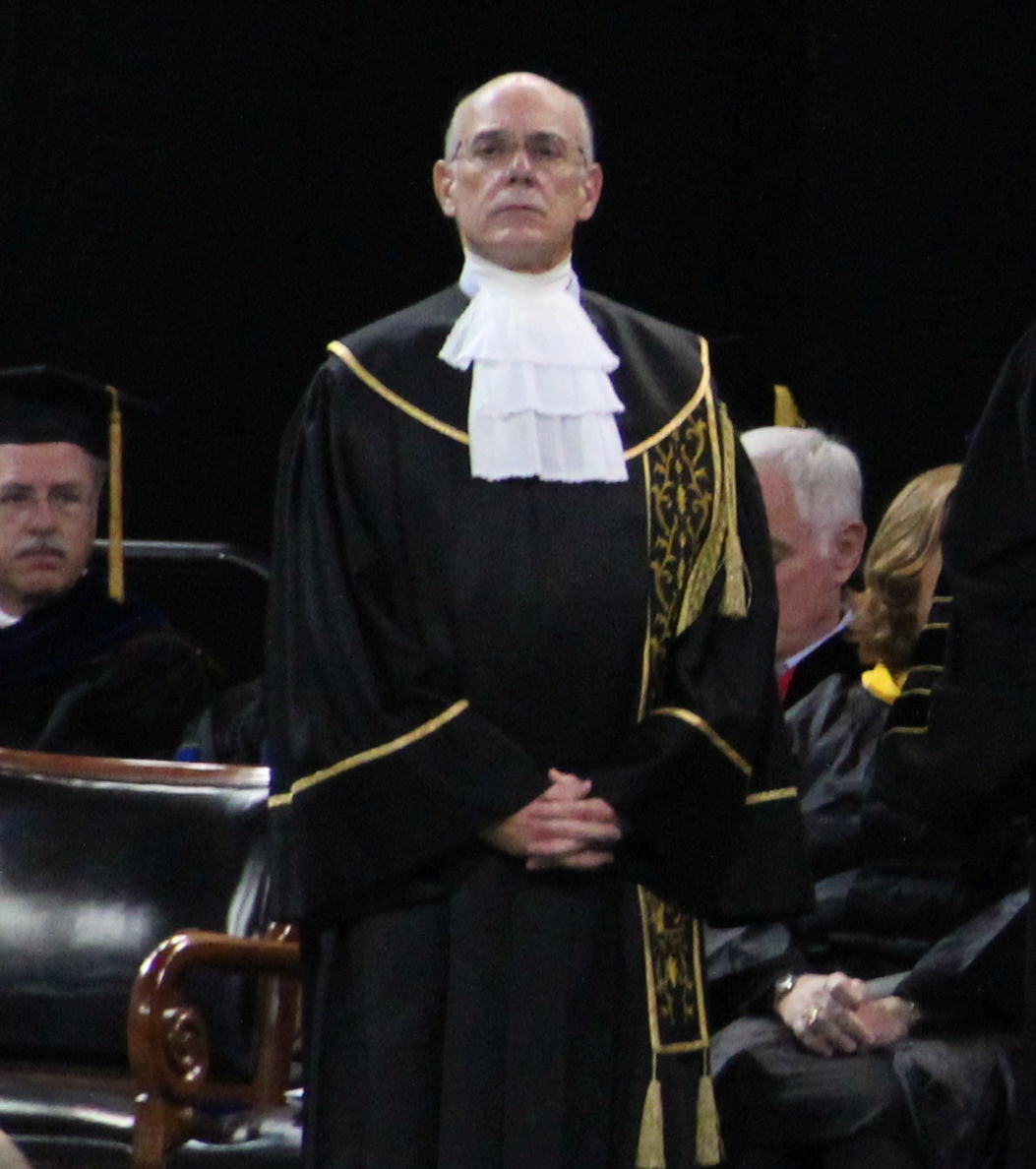
- Bras in 2016
- Born: Rafael Luis Bras; 1950 (age 75–76); San Juan, Puerto Rico
- Education: Colegio San Ignacio de Loyola; Massachusetts Institute of Technology
- Awards: Robert E. Horton Medal; National Academy of Engineering
- Scientific career
- Fields: Civil Engineering; Hydrology; Hydrometeorology; Hydroclimatology; Fluvial Geomorphology; Water Resources Systems
- Workplaces: Georgia Institute of Technology; University of California Irvine; Massachusetts Institute of Technology
- Website: Office of Provost

Rafael Luis Bras (born 1950) is a Puerto Rican civil engineer best known for his contributions in surface hydrology and hydrometeorology, including his work in soil-vegetation-atmosphere system modeling.

Bras served as the provost and executive vice president of Academic Affairs at the Georgia Institute of Technology from 2010 to 2020 with faculty appointments in the School of Civil and Environmental Engineering and the School of Earth and Atmospheric Sciences, and continues to be a professor at Georgia Tech.

== Education ==
A native of Puerto Rico, graduated from Colegio San Ignacio de Loyola. Bras studied at the Massachusetts Institute of Technology, where he received a bachelor's (1972), a master's in civil engineering (1974), and a science doctorate in water resources and hydrology (1975).

== Career ==
On completion of his doctorate, Bras worked for a time as an assistant professor at the University of Puerto Rico school of engineering.

Bras returned to MIT in July 1976, where he served for more than 32 years as a professor of Civil and Environmental Engineering and held an appointment in the Departments of Earth, Atmospheric and Planetary Sciences. He is a past chair of the MIT faculty, former head of the Civil and Environmental Engineering department, and director of the Ralph M. Parsons Laboratory at MIT.

On April 24, 2008, Bras was appointed as Dean of The Henry Samueli School of Engineering at the University of California, Irvine, effective September 1, 2008.

On July 15, 2010, Bras was named provost of the Georgia Institute of Technology. From 2010 to 2020, Bras was a professor at the Georgia Institute of Technology in the Schools of Civil and Environmental Engineering and of Earth and Atmospheric Sciences On January 22, 2020, Bras announced plans to step down as provost and remain a professor at the Georgia Institute of Technology. He officially stepped down on October 1, 2020 and continues to be a professor in the School of Civil and Environmental Engineering.

== Research ==
As an engineering hydrologist, Bras' major areas of interest include land-atmosphere interactions and geomorphology. With the goal of "coherent understanding of the global water cycle", Bras and Peter S. Eagleson at MIT led scientists to rethink the role of water as an essential component of Earth systems. Bras' books Random functions and hydrology (1985) and Hydrology : an introduction to hydrologic science (1990) are considered foundational publications in hydrologic sciences, combining traditional land hydrology with atmospheric science, ecology, geology, and geomorphology.

Bras has integrated probability and statistics into hydrology to improve forecasting and risk estimation. By examining the interactions of precipitation, runoff, and soil moisture, he has improved river-flow forecasting and flood estimation. Remote sensing, satellite data, and information technology can now be used to support distributed hydrologic modeling and the global mapping of water in near to real time. Bras has developed models of the structure and evolution of river basins in terms of their fractal organization and geometry. His work enables researchers to better understand erosional development on hillslopes and channels within catchments. Mass transport processes modelled include fluvial sedimentation, creep, rainsplash and landslides.

In his work in ecohydrology, Bras tries to integrate information about the hydrosphere, atmosphere and biosphere. He seeks to quantify the ways in which plants affect and are affected by hydrologic and energy cycles in the environment. With Elfatih Eltahir he examined the role of precipitation recycling on the atmospheric branch of the water cycle of the Amazon River basin, and showed that deforestation can have serious impacts on climate. Bras is considered a leading authority on soil-vegetation-atmosphere system modelling and the evolution of landscapes due to climatic disturbances including global warming.

Bras is listed as an ISI highly cited researcher by the Institute for Scientific Information in Ecology/Environment, Engineering. He is a registered professional engineer in several states. He has served as a professional consultant in multiple projects around the world. Beginning in 1995 Bras chaired an international panel for oversight of a system of barriers for the flood protection of Venice, Italy.

== Honors and awards ==
- 2017, Lifetime Achievement Award, Environmental & Water Resources Institute (EWRI) of the American Society of Civil Engineers (ASCE)
- 2015, Distinguished Member, American Society of Civil Engineers
- 2011, Corresponding Member, National Academy of Sciences of Mexico (Academia Nacional de Ciencias de México)
- 2010, Anthony J. Drexel Exceptional Achievement Award, Drexel University
- 2009, National Academy of Arts and Sciences of Puerto Rico (Academia de Artes y Ciencias de Puerto Rico)
- 2008, James R. Killian Jr. Faculty Achievement Award, MIT
- 2008, Simon W. Freese Environmental Engineering Award and Lecture, ASCE "for advancing the theory and practice of hydrologic sciences, including hydrometeorology and hydroclimatology."
- 2007, Honorary Diplomate of Water Resources Engineering, American Academy of Water Resources Engineers
- 2007, Robert E. Horton Medal, AGU
- 2006, Fellow, American Association for the Advancement of Science
- 2004, Corresponding Member, National Academy of Engineering, Mexico
- 2003, Hall of Fame (HHF), Hispanic Engineer National Achievement Awards Conference (HENAAC)
- 2002, NASA Exceptional Public Service Medal
- 2001, National Academy of Engineering, "For innovation in hydrological forecasting and hydrometeorology through application of new technology, probability, and statistics, and for the advancement of civil engineering education."
- 2001, Giants in Science Award of the Quality Education for Minorities (QEM) Mathematics, Science and Engineering Network
- 2000, Dr. Martin Luther King Jr. Leadership Award, MIT
- 1998, Clarke Prize Laureate for Outstanding Achievement in Water Science and Technology, National Water Research Institute (NWRI)
- 1994, Member, American Society of Civil Engineers (ASCE)
- 1993, Walter Huber Civil Engineering Research Prize, ASCE
- 1992, Fellow, American Meteorological Society
- 1992, Honoris Causa Laurea, Instituto di Idraulica Agraria, Universita Degli Studi di Perugia, Italy
- 1982, James B. Macelwane Medal, American Geophysical Union
- 1982, Fellow, American Geophysical Union
- 1982, John Simon Guggenheim Fellowship
- 1981, Hydrologic Sciences Award, American Geophysical Union

== Selected works ==
- Bras, Rafael L.; Rodriguez-Iturbe, Ignacio (1985). Random functions and hydrology. Reading, Mass.: Addison-Wesley. ISBN 9780201058659. Reprinted Dover, 1993.
- Bras, Rafael L. (1990). Hydrology : an introduction to hydrologic science. Reading, Mass.: Addison-Wesley. ISBN 978-0201059229.
- Bras, Rafael L., ed. (1993). The World at risk : natural hazards and climate change, Cambridge, MA 1992 (AIP Conference Proceedings 277). New York: American Institute of Physics. ISBN 1563960664.

== See also ==
- List of Puerto Ricans
- Puerto Rican scientists and inventors
