= John R. L. Allen =

British geologist (1932–2020)

John Robert Lawrence Allen, FRS, FSA (25 October 1932 – 18 October 2020) was a British geologist who made substantial contributions to sedimentology and archeology. He took a 1st class degree in geology at the University of Sheffield in 1955 and then proceeded to research for a PhD. However, notwithstanding declining to submit his thesis for examination, his outstanding qualities were recognised by the Professor of Geology at Reading University, another, but unrelated Percival Allen, with the award of the Martin Lees Research Fellowship in 1958. So began a career at the University of Reading which continued to his retirement: appointment as lecturer in geology in 1961 was followed by promotion to Reader in 1967 and to a Personal Professorship of Geology in 1972 at the age of 39. In 1988 he was appointed Director of the newly formed Postgraduate Research Institute in Sedimentology. The flagship MSc trained many outstanding students, among whom are leading figures of the world's oil industry. Emeritus Professor since 2001, John continued to teach and be involved in the university until his death.

== Honours ==
Allen received a number of awards in his career:

- The Lyell Medal of the Geological Society of London in 1980.
- The Twenhofel Medal of the Society for Sedimentary Geology SEPM, in 1987.
- The G. K. Warren Prize of the US National Academy of Sciences in 1990.
- The Sorby Medal of the International Association of Sedimentologists (IAS) in 1994.
- The Penrose Medal of the Geological Society of America in 1996.

He was elected a Fellow of the Royal Society (FRS) on 1979. and a Fellow of the Society of Antiquaries of London (FSA) on 21 November 1991.

== Selected works ==
- Sedimentary Structures vol. 1, Elsevier Science, 1982, ISBN 978-0-444-41935-4
- Sedimentary Structures vol. 2, Elsevier, 1982, ISBN 978-0-444-41945-3
- Principles of Physical Sedimentology Allen & Unwin, 1985, ISBN 0-04-551096-2
- Carrstone in Norfolk Buildings British Archaeological Reports British Series 2004, ISBN 978-1-84171-613-8
- Geology for Archaeologists: A Short Introduction Archaeopress Publishing Limited 2017, ISBN 978-1-78491-687-9
