= William F. Powers =

Former Vice President of Research for the Ford Motor Company

William F. Powers (born 1940) is a former Vice President of Research for the Ford Motor Company. In 1992 he was elected a Foreign Member of the Royal Swedish Academy of Engineering Sciences.

Powers earned his bachelor's degree in Aerospace Engineering in 1963 at the University of Florida, then a master's degree in Aerospace Engineering in 1966 and a Ph.D. in Engineering Mechanics in 1968 from the University of Texas at Austin. He was at NASA Marshall Space Flight Center from Jan 1960 - Mar 1968, on the Apollo program. Between Mar 1968 and Dec 1980, Bill was Professor of Aerospace Engineering at the University of Michigan and consulted on the Space Shuttle. He was with Ford Motor Company from 1979 until 2000. When he retired from Ford in 2000, he was a Vice President and the head of Ford Research.

He was elected a member of the National Academy of Engineering in 1993 for leadership in advancing research and development of automotive technology.
