= Martha Anderson =

Hydrologist

- Education: University of Minnesota
- Scientific career
- Thesis: The Evolution of relativistic electron populations in shell supernova remnants (1993)

Martha Carol Anderson is research scientist with the United States Department of Agriculture. She is known for her work in using satellite imagery to track droughts and their impact on crops. In 2022, she was elected a fellow of the American Geophysical Union. In 2024, she was elected a fellow of the National Academy of Engineering.

== Education and career ==
Anderson has a B.A. in physics from Carleton College (1987), and she earned her Ph.D. in astrophysics from the University of Minnesota in 1993. Following her Ph.D., she moved to the University of Wisconsin-Madison where she worked first as a postdoctoral researcher and then as an associate researcher and assistant scientist. In 2005, she moved to the Agricultural Research Service as a research physical scientist.

== Research ==
Anderson conducted her Ph.D. research in the field of observational astrophysics, focusing on the investigation of supernovae. She then changed her research focus to the interactions between soils, plants, and the atmosphere and how this is detected using remote sensing. She uses data from satellites to develop models that are used to predict droughts and soil moisture stress, and the subsequent impacts on crops.

== Selected publications ==
- Anderson, M. C.; Norman, J. M.; Diak, G. R.; Kustas, W. P.; Mecikalski, J. R. (1997-05-01). "A two-source time-integrated model for estimating surface fluxes using thermal infrared remote sensing". Remote Sensing of Environment. 60 (2): 195–216. Bibcode:1997RSEnv..60..195A. doi:10.1016/S0034-4257(96)00215-5. ISSN 0034-4257.
- Anderson, Martha C.; Norman, John M.; Mecikalski, John R.; Otkin, Jason A.; Kustas, William P. (2007-05-27). "A climatological study of evapotranspiration and moisture stress across the continental United States based on thermal remote sensing: 1. Model formulation: EVAPOTRANSPIRATION AND MOISTURE STRESS". Journal of Geophysical Research: Atmospheres. 112 (D10). doi:10.1029/2006JD007506.
- Anderson, M. C.; Kustas, W. P.; Norman, J. M.; Hain, C. R.; Mecikalski, J. R.; Schultz, L.; González-Dugo, M. P.; Cammalleri, C.; d'Urso, G.; Pimstein, A.; Gao, F. (2011-01-21). "Mapping daily evapotranspiration at field to continental scales using geostationary and polar orbiting satellite imagery". Hydrology and Earth System Sciences. 15 (1): 223–239. Bibcode:2011HESS...15..223A. doi:10.5194/hess-15-223-2011. hdl:10447/53094. ISSN 1607-7938.
- Roy, D. P.; Wulder, M. A.; Loveland, T. R.; C.e., Woodcock; Allen, R. G.; Anderson, M. C.; Helder, D.; Irons, J. R.; Johnson, D. M.; Kennedy, R.; Scambos, T. A.; Schaaf, C. B.; Schott, J. R.; Sheng, Y.; Vermote, E. F. (2014-04-05). "Landsat-8: Science and product vision for terrestrial global change research". Remote Sensing of Environment. 145: 154–172. Bibcode:2014RSEnv.145..154R. doi:10.1016/j.rse.2014.02.001. ISSN 0034-4257. S2CID 109926873.

== Awards and honors ==
In 2022, Anderson was elected a fellow of the American Geophysical Union. In 2022, she also received the John Dalton medal from the European Geosciences Union in recognition of her work on "multi-scale thermal remote sensing to evapotranspiration and drought impact assessments."
