= Andrew J. Ouderkirk =

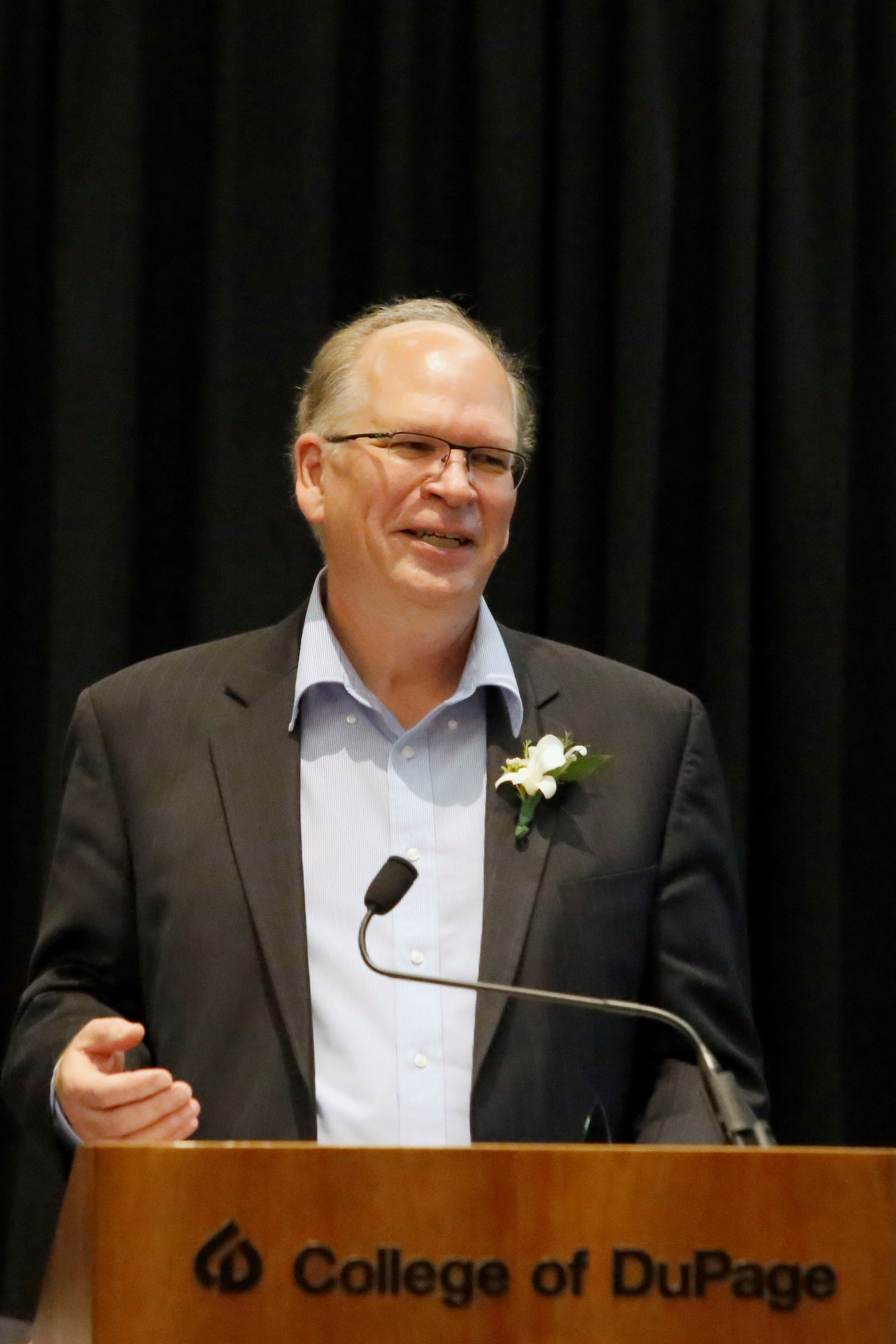
- Andrew J. Ouderkirk at the College of DuPage Distinguished Alumni of 2016 event
- Education: Ph.D. in Physical Chemistry
- Alma mater: Northwestern University
- Occupation: Material Engineer
- Employer: Oculus Research
- Known for: Optic Film Research

Andrew J. Ouderkirk is a widely recognized senior scientist at 3M, an American multinational conglomerate. He was elected a member of the National Academy of Engineering in 2005 for the development and commercialization of multilayer polymer films with unique optical properties. He is prolific inventor listed on 308 U.S. patents as of September 29, 2020 and a principal developer of a class of highly efficient polymer-based mirrors Dr. Ouderkirk currently works for Oculus Research.

== See also ==
- 3M
- List of prolific inventors
- Materials Science
- Oculus VR
