= Water International =

Water resources academic journal

- Discipline: Water management
- Language: English
- Edited by: James E. Nickum

Publication details
- History: 1972-present
- Publisher: Routledge
- Frequency: 8/year
- Open access: Hybrid
- Impact factor: 3.395 (2021)

Standard abbreviations
- ISO 4: Water Int.

Indexing
- CODEN: WAINEL
- ISSN: 0250-8060 (print); 1941-1707 (web)
- LCCN: 2008214335
- OCLC no.: 2244031

Links
- Journal homepage; Online access; Online archive

Water International is a peer-reviewed scientific journal covering research on water resources. It is the official journal of the International Water Resources Association and was established in 1972. The journal is published by Routledge in 8 issues per year and focuses on international water resources including science, technology, governance, management, and policy. The editor-in-chief is James E. Nickum (International Water Resources Association, Japan).

== Abstracting and indexing ==
The journal is abstracted and indexed in:

- Aquatic Sciences and Fisheries Abstracts
- CAB Abstracts
- EBSCO databases
- Inspec
- Metadex
- PASCAL
- ProQuest databases
- Science Citation Index Expanded
- Scopus

According to the Journal Citation Reports, the journal has a 2021 impact factor of 3.395.

== See also ==
- Water Research
- Water (journal)
- Journal of Irrigation & Drainage Engineering
