= Dara Entekhabi =

- Education: Massachusetts Institute of Technology; Clark University
- Scientific career
- Fields: Hydrology; Hydroclimatology; Remote Sensing
- Workplaces: Massachusetts Institute of Technology
- Doctoral advisor: Peter S. Eagleson
- Website: Personal Website

Dara Entekhabi is the Bacardi and Stockholm Water Foundations Professor in the Department of Civil and Environmental Engineering and the Department of Earth, Atmospheric and Planetary Sciences at Massachusetts Institute of Technology. His research spans a variety of topics in hydrology, including land-atmosphere interactions, surface water - groundwater interactions, data assimilation, and remote sensing.

In 2015, he was named Fellow of the Institute of Electrical and Electronics Engineers (IEEE) for contributions to microwave remote sensing of soil moisture. In 2017, he was elected as a member of National Academy of Engineering for leadership in the hydrologic sciences including the scientific underpinnings for satellite observation of the Earth's water cycle.

== Awards ==
- Presidential Young Investigator Award, National Science Foundation (NSF), 1991
- Lettere ed Arti, Cav. Arturo Parisatti Prize, Istituto Veneto di Scienze, 1994
- James B. Macelwane Medal, American Geophysical Union (AGU), 1996
- Fellow, American Geophysical Union (AGU), 1996
- Fellow, American Meteorological Society (AMS), 2003
- Robert E. Horton Lecture, American Meteorological Society, 2012
- Boussinesq Lecture, Boussinesq Center for Hydrology, The Netherlands, 2014
- Fellow, Institute of Electrical and Electronics Engineers (IEEE), 2015
- Hydrologic Sciences Award, American Geophysical Union, 2015
- Hydrology Days Award, CSU and AGU, 2016
- Eagleson Lecture, Consortium Universities for Advancement of Hydrologic Science, 2016
- Member, National Academy of Engineering (NAE), 2017
- Dave & Lucille Atlas Remote Sensing Prize, American Meteorological Society, 2017
- NASA Group Achievement Award (Soil Moisture Active Passive Mission), 2017
- NASA Outstanding Public Leadership Medal, 2017

== Leadership ==
- Science Team Leader, Soil Moisture Active Passive (SMAP) mission, NASA, Phase E, January 31, 2015, launch.
- Science Team Member, Airborne Microwave Observatory of Subcanopy and Subsurface (AirMOSS), NASA, Phase E, 2012-2018.
- International Science Team Member, Water Cycle Observation Mission (WCOM), China Academy of Science, Phase A, 2017 Launch.
- Principal Investigator, The Hydrosphere State satellite mission (HYDROS), NASA Earth System Science Pathfinder program, 2000-2005.
