= M. Gordon Wolman =

American geographer

Markley Gordon Wolman (August 16, 1924 – February 24, 2010) was an American geographer, son of Abel Wolman. He was born in Baltimore, Maryland. He attended Haverford College before being drafted into the U.S. Navy during World War II. After the war, he returned to Baltimore and graduated from the Johns Hopkins University in 1949 with a degree in geography. He earned a doctorate in geology from Harvard University in 1953.

At the age of 12, he was sent to work on a Connecticut dairy farm for the summer. “My mother said she wanted me to know that milk didn’t come from a bottle.” Returning to the farm for several years after that, he first became exposed to the problem of soil erosion and the effect it has on water supplies. After serving in the US Navy during World War II, he returned to Baltimore and earned his BA in geology in 1949.

As a scientist at the U.S. Geological Survey in the 1950s, he and colleague Luna Leopold published pioneering studies on how and why rivers change. With their emphasis on measuring rivers' characteristics, including depths and velocities and the size of river-bottom pebbles, they transformed geomorphology—the study of landforms' evolution—from a descriptive to a quantitative discipline, making it possible to predict how natural and human-caused perturbations might affect river channels. Their 1964 textbook, "Fluvial Processes in Geomorphology," co-written with John Miller, is considered a seminal work. His method for sampling particle size distribution of riverbeds became known as the “Wolman Pebble Count” and is still a standard technique for geomorphologists.

Dr. Wolman applied his expertise to local problems beginning in the 1960s, when his report on how runoff from construction projects was choking Maryland's streams with sediment helped lead to new state regulations. He later headed the Oyster Roundtable, a coalition of environmentalists, watermen and scientists that designed a plan to reverse the Chesapeake Bay's catastrophic oyster decline during the 1990s. Wolman was also one of the leading forces behind Maryland's sediment and erosion control law, passed in 1970, based on the US federal Clean Water Act.

In 1958, Dr. Wolman accepted a faculty position at the Johns Hopkins University. An early proponent of interdisciplinary education, he helped combine the departments of geography and sanitary and water resources to create the department of geography and environmental engineering, which he chaired for 20 years until 1990. In 1988, Wolman was elected to the National Academy of Sciences, and in 1992 he was elected to the National Academy of Engineering.

== Honors ==
- 1988 - Elected to the National Academy of Sciences.
- 1989 - Cullum Geographical Medal
- 1999 - Penrose Medal
- 2000 - Robert E. Horton Medal
- 2006 - Awarded, along with Luna Leopold, the prestigious Benjamin Franklin Medal in Earth and Environmental Science
- Past president of the Geological Society of America.
