= Rong Fu =

Chinese-American climatologist

Rong Fu is a Chinese-American climatologist, meteorologist, researcher, professor, and published author with more than 100 articles, books, and projects detailing changes that occur in Earth's atmosphere and how they affect climate, seasons, rainfall, and the like. Fu has been invited to present over 115 presentations and seminars, and has administered more than 32 projects that received over 11 million dollars in funding. The focus areas of Fu's research are convection; cloud and precipitation processes and their role in climate; atmospheric transport in the upper troposphere and lower stratosphere; the interaction between the atmosphere and ocean and terrestrial vegetation; satellite remote sensing applications and retrievals; the interaction between rainfall rates and the rainforest in regions of the Amazon rainforest; and drought prediction in states across the United States, including California and Texas. She is currently a professor in the Atmospheric and Oceanic Sciences Department at UCLA and the associate director of UCLA's Joint Institute for Regional Earth System Science and Engineering. She is also an adjunct professor in the Jackson School of Geosciences at the University of Texas at Austin.

== Early life and education ==
Rong Fu was born in China. At the time, women were encouraged to pursue an education and enter the workforce afterwards. Fu attended Peking University and graduated as a meteorology major. She continued her education at Columbia University, where she worked as a graduate research assistant and obtained her Ph.D. in atmospheric sciences. After completing her degree at Columbia University, Fu came to the University of California, Los Angeles (UCLA) as a post-doctoral researcher in the Department of Atmospheric Sciences.

== Career ==
Fu's career spans decades of work as a climatologist, meteorologist, faculty and chair at multiple universities, and president of scientific organizations. After receiving degrees from Columbia University and UCLA, Fu was welcomed to the Geophysical Fluid Dynamics Laboratory at Princeton University as a visiting scientist. After her time in Princeton, Fu spent five years at the University of Arizona as an assistant professor in the Department of Atmospheric Sciences. Moving on from the University of Arizona, Fu became an associate professor in the School of Earth Atmospheric Sciences at the Georgia Institute of Technology. During her time at Georgia Tech, Fu served as a guest professor at Beijing Normal University from 2007 through 2011. Fu's time at the University of Texas at Austin was as a professor at the Jackson School of Geosciences. During this time, Fu was also the associate chair of the Department of Geological Sciences and the leader of the Climate Dynamics Discipline. Fu was also elected as the president of the Global Environmental Change Focus Group of the American Geophysical Union, serving from January 2013 to December 2016. During her time in Austin, Texas, Fu was on a team of climatologists and meteorologists who worked with a Texas state agency to design a prediction system that would help predict seasons of drought.

Fu has been invited to attend and speak at over 115 presentations and seminars. She has been the keynote speaker and invited to give presentations at Universidad De Antioquia, in Medellin, Colombia, Stanford University, Princeton University, UCLA, University of Illinois, University of Tennessee, Nanjing University of Information Science and Technology in Nanjing, China, University of Hawaii at Manoa, and many more.

Fu has administered over 32 projects with more than $11 million in funding and has been the principal investigator for more than $9 million of that funding. Many of these projects focused on the effects of rainfall, climate variations, and seasonality on environments and on predicting climatic trends. Fu's research overlaps with that of hydrologists, agriculturists, and ecologists.

Fu has been on the board of reviewers for 15 journals and publications, including Science, Nature, Journal of Climate, Journal of Hydrometeorology, Earth's Future, andInternational Journal of Climatology. She has reviewed grant proposals for agencies including the National Science Foundation (NSF), National Aeronautic and Space Administration (NASA), National Oceanographic and Atmospheric Administration (NOAA), and the Canadian Foundation for Climate and Atmospheric Sciences.

Her career has also included work teaching graduate and undergraduate courses in the geosciences and atmospheric sciences at universities including Georgia Tech, UT Austin, the University of Arizona, and UCLA.

Fu currently works at UCLA as a faculty member in the Department of Atmospheric and Oceanic Sciences and is serving as a visiting chair professor at Tsinghua University in China.

== Research ==
Fu's research has spanned topics including convection, cloud and precipitation processes and their role in climate; atmospheric transport in the upper troposphere and lower stratosphere; interactions between the atmosphere, the ocean, and the vegetation produced by the land; and satellite remote sensing applications and retrievals.

Fu's research in the Amazon and across South America has demonstrated the importance of maintenance of the rainforest in sustaining the rainfall rates of the Amazon. Fu hopes to expands these research efforts to other areas such as the Congo.

== Honors and awards ==
Fu has received numerous awards. Fu has been the recipient of the NSF Career Award 1995, NASA Mission to Planet Earth New Investigator Award 1996, The Chinese National Science Foundation (CNSF) Outstanding Overseas Chinese Scientist Award 2004, Georgia Institute of Technology Hesbourgh Award Teaching Fellow 2004, American Geophysical Union 2006 Editors' Citation for Excellence in Refereeing for Geophysical Research Letter, NASA Group Achievement Award 2007, Upper Atmosphere Research Satellite Team and Fellow, and the American Meteorological Society 2015.

Fu has had her work published by newspapers and other media, including New York Times, Wall Street Journal, Washington Post, Newsweek, United Press International, LiveScience, the Huffington Post, BBC Discovery Natural History, NASA News and Earth Observing Features, BBC Natural History One Planet, and the Discovery Channel.
