= Hyla Napadensky =

American chemical and mechanical engineer

Hyla Sarane Napadensky (née Siegel, 1929–2022) was an American chemical and mechanical engineer known for her expertise in rocket propellants and explosives, their vulnerability to detonation caused by low-speed impacts, and the risks of handling explosive materials and devices.

== Early life and education ==
Napadensky was born on November 12, 1929 in Chicago. Her parents were emigrants from Russia to the US by way of Toronto, and earned a meager living, in poor health, operating a stationary business in Chicago. Motivated to do better, Napadensky set aside her interests in music and art, finished high school at age 15, and studied mathematics at the University of Chicago, where she received a bachelor's degree in 1950 and a master's degree in 1952. She also studied physics at the University of Chicago, and chemical and mechanical engineering at the Illinois Institute of Technology, at the graduate level but without receiving a degree in those subjects.

== Career and later life ==
After finishing her studies in 1952, Napadensky worked for five years at International Harvester, where her work included an early application of computers in the design of tractor engine gearing. In 1956, in Caracas, Venezuela, she married Isaac Arnaldo (Arnold) Napadensky Cahanovich, an Argentine-born Brazilian-Venezuelan immigrant of Romanian descent, whom she had met in Illinois Institute of Technology. They had two daughters, and in later life her husband worked as a land surveyor and construction inspector.

In 1957 she moved to the Illinois Institute of Technology as a researcher in the Explosion Science and Engineering Department. In her time there, she became a director of research, and a senior engineering advisor. In 1988 she founded the consulting company Napadensky Energetics.

She retired with her husband in 1994, and moved from Illinois to a home near Grand Marais, Minnesota. She died on March 19, 2022 in Madison, Wisconsin.

== Recognition ==
Napadensky was elected to the National Academy of Engineering, in 1984, "for developing experimental and analytical models of propellant and explosive sensitivity to initiation of detonation by low-velocity impact".
