= Georgia Destouni =

Geophysicist

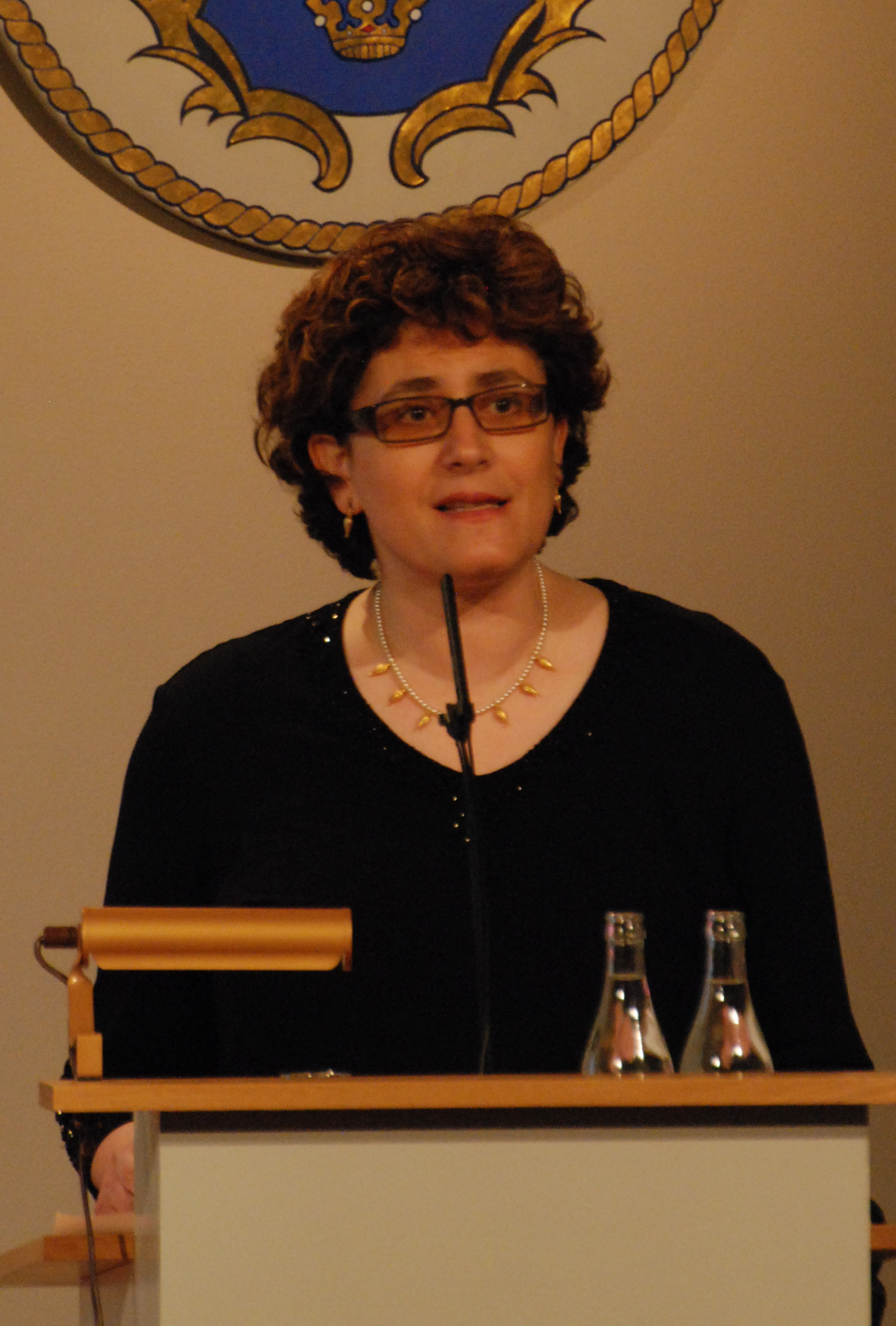
- Born: 26 January 1961 (age 65)
- Education: KTH Royal Institute of Technology
- Awards: European Geosciences Union Henry Darcy Medal (2013)
- Scientific career
- Workplaces: Stockholm University
- Thesis: Hydraulics Engineering, Title: Solute fluxes and travel times in heterogeneous soil (1991)

Georgia "Gia" Destouni (born 26 January 1961) is a professor of hydrology at Stockholm University. She works on the Baltic Sea Region Programme as well as studying the impact of climate change on societies in Northern Europe. She is the chair of the Global Wetland Ecohydrology Network (GWEN) and was involved with the National Geosphere Laboratory.

== Early life and education ==
Destouni studied civil engineering at KTH Royal Institute of Technology, earning her master's degree in 1987. She remained there for her doctoral studies, working in hydraulic engineering and completing her PhD in 1991. Owing to Destouni's contributions to academia, she was awarded a docent degree in 1993.

== Research and career ==
Destouni was a research fellow at the Swedish Natural Science Research Council from 1992 to 1998. Here she worked on hydrological transport models, and spent a year as a visiting scientist at the University of Florida. Her early research included the transport of solutes by groundwater in aquifers. In particular, she looked at hydrological transport in soil-groundwater systems. Destouni was appointed as an associate professor at the KTH Royal Institute of Technology in 1998, and was made a full professor in 1999.

In 2005 Destouni moved to Stockholm University. She has looked at leaching from mining rocks, and how pollution can be managed in large water resource systems. She has investigated how nutrient loads are discharged into the Baltic Sea. During these investigations, she identified hotspots of pollution that had been overlooked from environmental monitoring. After Destouni identified these hotspots, Sweden set up 10 new monitoring stations to augment the environmental network.

Destouni was one of the first to demonstrate the impact of dams and irrigation on the global amount of fresh water. The freshwater footprint estimated by Destouni and colleagues was significantly larger than previously thought.

=== Academic service ===
Destouni was made Secretary General of the Swedish Research Council Formas in 2013. In 2014 she was elected to Academia.Net for her work in hydrology. She was elected to the Scientific Advisory Committee of Science Europe in 2016. She serves as the Vice Chair of the International Association of Hydrological Sciences and is part of the Baltic Sea Region Programme. She is a board member of the Stockholm Resilience Centre, as well as a member of the American Geophysical Union Union Fellows Committee.

=== Awards and honours ===
- 2003 Elected to the Royal Swedish Academy of Sciences
- 2003 Elected to the Academy of Engineering Sciences
- 2013 European Geosciences Union Henry Darcy Medal
- 2015 Elected to the American Geophysical Union
