= Walter B. Langbein =

American hydrologist (1907–1982)

Walter B. Langbein (1907 – 1982) was an American hydrologist and geomorphologist. He worked at the US Geological Survey for 33 years.

Langbein was the co-author of Water Facts for the Nation's Future. He won a G. K. Warren Prize and a Robert E. Horton Medal.
