= Elfatih Eltahir =

Sudanese American geophysicist and climate scientist

Elfatih Eltahir FAGU FTWAS
- الفاتح الطاهر
- Born: Elfatih Ali Babiker Eltahir; October 1961 (age 64); Omdurman, Sudan
- Citizenship: United States; Sudan
- Education: University of Khartoum (BSc); National University of Ireland (MSc); Massachusetts Institute of Technology (MSc, Sc.D.)
- Awards: PECASE (1997); Kuwait Prize in Applied Sciences (1999); Hydrologic Sciences Award, AGU (2017)
- Scientific career
- Fields: Hydrology; Water resources Climate change Meteorology
- Institutions: Massachusetts Institute of Technology
- Thesis: Interactions of hydrology and climate in the Amazon basin (1993)
- Doctoral advisor: Rafael L. Bras
- Website: https://eltahir.mit.edu/

Elfatih Ali Babiker Eltahir (Arabic: الفاتح علي بابكر الطاهر; born October 1961) is a Sudanese-American Professor of Civil and Environmental Engineering, H.M. King Bhumibol Professor of Hydrology and Climate, and Director of the MIT-UM6P Research Program at the Massachusetts Institute of Technology.

== Early life and education ==
Elfatih Eltahir was born in Omdurman, Sudan, in October 1961 to Ali Babiker Eltahir and Nafisa Hassan Musa.

He earned a Bachelor of Science (First Class Honours) in civil engineering from the University of Khartoum in 1985. He won the university Merghani Hamza Prize. He then completed a Master of Science (First Class Honours) in hydrology at the National University of Ireland in 1988, and winning the McLaughlin Award. Eltahir then completed another Master of Science in meteorology and a Doctor of Science (Sc.D.) in Hydro-climatology, both in 1993, from the Massachusetts Institute of Technology (MIT). His project was about the “interactions of hydrology and climate in the Amazon basin”, which was funded by the NASA Fellowship in Global Change Research and was supervised by Rafael L. Bras.

== Career and research ==
Eltahir continued working at MIT after his Sc.D. as a post-doctoral associate before being promoted to assistant professor in 1994. In 1995, he became the Gilbert Winslow Career Development Chair (1995–1998). In 1998, he became an Associate Professor and then a professor of Civil and Environmental Engineering in 2003. He is the H.M. King Bhumibol Professor of Hydrology and Climate, and the Director of the MIT-Mohammed VI Polytechnic University (UM6P) Research Program which focuses on sustainable development in Africa.

Eltahir's research focuses on developing numerical models, that are verified against satellite observations, to study how global climate change may impact society through changes in water availability and disease outbreaks, especially in Africa and Asia.

== Award and honours ==
Eltahir received NASA's New Investigator Award in 1996, US Presidential Early Career Award for Scientists and Engineers (PECASE) in 1997, and Kuwait Prize in Applied Sciences for his work on Climate Change in 1999. He was elected a Fellow of the American Geophysical Union (AGU) in 2008, and then received AGU's Hydrologic Sciences Award in 2017.

In 2023, he was elected a member of the National Academy of Engineering (NAE), and a Fellow of The World Academy of Sciences (TWAS) for the advancement of science in developing countries. Eltahir is a member of the American Meteorological Society, the Royal Meteorological Society, the American Society of Civil Engineers, the Sudan Engineering Society, and the Sudanese National Academy of Sciences.

== Personal life ==
Eltahir has six siblings, and married Shahinaz Ahmed Badri in December 1991. He has two children, Nafisa (Reuters’ Correspondent for Sudan and Egypt) and Mohamed.

== Books ==
- Eltahir, Elfatih A. B. (2019-11-11). A Path Forward for Sharing the Nile Water: Sustainable, Smart, Equitable, Incremental. Eltahir Research Group. ISBN 978-1734069617. OCLC 1243325049.
- Eltahir, Elfatih A. B.; Bomblies, Arne; Yamana, Teresa K. (2020-09-28). Projecting the Impacts of Climate Change on Malaria Transmission in Africa. Eltahir Research Group. ISBN 978-1734069631.
- Eltahir, Elfatih A. B.; Wang, Guiling; Siam, Mohamed S. (2021-05-14). Natural Variability of the Nile Floods: From Pharaoh's Dream to El Niño / La Niña. Eltahir Research Group. ISBN 978-1734069662.
- Eltahir, Elfatih A. B.; Tuel, Alexandre (2022-05-31). Future Climate of the Mediterranean and Southern Europe. Eltahir Research Group. ISBN 978-1734069679.
- Eltahir, Elfatih A. B. (2022-08-01). Hotspots for Heat Stress in a Changing Climate: Persian Gulf, South Asia, and Eastern China. Eltahir Research Group. ISBN 979-8986287409.
