= Hydroclimatology =

Scientific field

Hydroclimatology is a scientific field of research that studies the impact of climate on the water cycle. The concept was defined by Walter B. Langbein in 1967 and further expanded by Wayne M. Wendland in 1987. Although research within the scope of the field has been traced back to Ancient Greece, it has only achieved some maturity by the 20th century.

Plato was among the first ancient Greek philosophers who studied, by the 400s BC, what would later be called hydroclimatology. His study was later built on by Aristotle and then ancient Roman scholar Vitruvius. The field would be quantified later by Pierre Perrault, Edme Mariotte and Edmond Halley in the 17th century.
