= Diploma of Imperial College =

Doctoral certificate of English university

The Diploma of the Imperial College (DIC) is an academic certificate awarded by Imperial College London to its doctoral and master's students upon graduation. DIC is a post-nominal award that is issued by Imperial College London to postgraduate students who successfully complete the PhD, EngD, MD(Res), MSc, MRes, MBA, MPH, MEd or MPhil degree. For example, Brian May PhD DIC implies that the student was awarded a PhD from the University of London / Imperial College and the DIC from the Imperial College London.

The DIC is typically jointly awarded to degree students satisfactorily completing a minimum of one year's postgraduate work consisting of research and advanced study. Imperial was part of the University of London until 2007 and Imperial College bestowed the University of London's degrees as well as its own diplomas. Now Imperial College degrees are awarded, although the award may be studied for on its own.

To be awarded a DIC by research, the student needs to be registered as a student of the college and apply for registration on the appropriate form within three months of entering upon the course. Imperial also hosts visiting students from institutions outside the UK who attend classes and complete courses at the college. Although visiting students are not awarded a degree by Imperial and the final degree is awarded by the overseas institution the student is affiliated with, visiting students working at the college for at least a year are eligible for the Imperial College International Diploma. For example, students from the French engineering school Centrale Paris are eligible for the diploma, granted they pass all the modules.
