= International Water Resources Association =

International Water Resources Association (IWRA)
- Established: 1971, 46 years ago
- Type: Professional Association
- Purpose: Sustainable water management
- Headquarters: Paris, France
- Region served: Worldwide
- Method: Congresses, events, publications, webinars, networking
- Key people: Ven Te Chow (founder), Gabriel Eckstein (President), Callum Clench (Executive Director)
- Website: iwra.org

The International Water Resources Association (IWRA) is a nonprofit and non-governmental organization, with the purpose of improving the management of water resources. It is a professional network of water experts which facilitates global knowledge sharing of water resources information across disciplines and geographies. IWRA accomplishes its goal of education and knowledge sharing through events, publications and networking opportunities. The IWRA executive office is located in Paris.

== History ==
The IWRA was incorporated in the U.S. state of Wisconsin in 1971 as a global forum for interdisciplinary knowledge and experience exchange, to supplement the activities of existing organisations and to fill interdisciplinary voids that existed in the professional field of water resources. The association began operation in 1972 with Ven Te Chow as the first president. In 1988, the Ven Te Chow Memorial Lecture and Award was initiated to honor the founding president.

== World Water Congress ==
The flagship event organized by the IWRA is the World Water Congress. It has occurred 16 times since 1973, in various locations around the world, having previously occurred in the USA, India, Mexico, Argentina, Belgium, Canada, Morocco, Egypt, Australia, Spain, France, Brazil, and Scotland. These congresses are a meeting space for stakeholders from multiple disciplines to connect, identify global water themes and present new knowledge, research and developments in the industry. Its themes work towards achieving elements of the Sustainable Development Goals and the COP 21 Paris Agreement. During the VIIIth World Water Congress held in Cairo, Egypt in November 1994, a special session led to the development of the World Water Council. The XVIth World Water Congress took place in Cancun, Mexico in May 2017, and focused on the theme of Bridging Science and Policy.

== Cancun Declaration ==
A major outcome of the XVI World Water Congress was IWRA's Cancun Declaration - A Call for Action to Bridge Science and Water Policy-Making for Sustainable Development. This Declaration calls for urgent mobilization of knowledge generators, governments, donors, professionals and civil society to join their efforts to achieve the 2030 Agenda and Sustainable Development Goals. At a time where science is often pressured from both policy and funding perspectives, this declaration stresses that business as usual in science, policy and implementation is not an option, and that stronger efforts for new interdisciplinary knowledge and better knowledge sharing are crucial. This means that scientific evidence-based policy making is essential, and the dissemination of good practices is key for fostering the implementation of adaptive solutions. The Declaration calls for action from policy makers, scientists and professionals as well as civil society.

IWRA Cancun Declaration

== Publications ==
The official peer-reviewed journal of IWRA is Water International (WI), published through Taylor and Francis. It contains original articles and technical notes. In addition, IWRA publishes Policy Briefs alongside WI articles, published with support from Routledge. IWRA Update is the quarterly newsletter distributed to members on global water news and association activities.
