= Evelyn Wang =

American mechanical engineer and professor (born 1978)

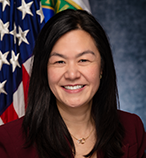
- Born: 1978 (age 47–48); New York, U.S.
- Education: Massachusetts Institute of Technology (BS); Stanford University (MS, PhD)
- Parent: Kang L. Wang (father)
- Awards: Prince Sultan bin Abdulaziz International Prize for Water (2018); US National Academy of Engineering (2025)
- Scientific career
- Fields: Mechanical engineering
- Workplaces: Bell Labs; Massachusetts Institute of Technology
- Thesis: Characterization of Microfabricated Two-Phase Heat Sinks for IC Cooling Applications (2006)
- Doctoral advisors: Thomas W. Kenny; Kenneth E. Goodson
- Website: meche.mit.edu/people/faculty/enwang@mit.edu

Evelyn Ning-Yi Wang is an American mechanical engineer and academic who is the Ford Professor of Mechanical Engineering at the Massachusetts Institute of Technology (MIT), where she is the Vice President for Energy and Climate. She is also the director of the Device Research Laboratory at MIT. Topics in her research include heat transfer, ultrahydrophobicity, solar energy and nanostructures.

== Early life and education ==
Wang was born to a Taiwanese American family in New York in 1978. Her father, Kang L. Wang, is an engineering professor who emigrated from Taiwan to the US to attend graduate school at the Massachusetts Institute of Technology (MIT). Her mother, Edith Wang, was also a graduate student at MIT. After her father became a professor at the University of California, Los Angeles, Wang grew up in Santa Monica, California, where she attended public school and traveled internationally as part of a youth orchestra.

After high school, Wang graduated from the Massachusetts Institute of Technology with a B.S. in mechanical engineering in 2000. Her two older brothers also attended MIT. She then earned her M.S. in mechanical engineering in 2001 and her Ph.D. in mechanical engineering in 2006 from Stanford University. Her dissertation, "Characterization of Microfabricated Two-Phase Heat Sinks for IC Cooling Applications," was jointly supervised by professors Thomas W. Kenny and Kenneth E. Goodson.

== Career and research ==
After receiving her doctorate, Wang did postdoctoral research at Bell Labs before returning to MIT as a faculty member in 2007.

Wang is particularly known for her research on solar-powered devices to extract drinkable water from the atmosphere. Scientific American and the World Economic Forum named her technology that produces water from air in an arid climate as one of the "Top 10 Emerging Technologies of 2017". Her water extraction device, which she designed in collaboration with Omar M. Yaghi, has been compared to the moisture vaporators on the desert planet Tatooine in Star Wars. However, rather than using refrigeration to condense water vapor, it uses a metal–organic framework to trap water vapor in the night and then uses the heat from solar energy to release the water from the framework during the day. Her research group has also developed a solar powered desalination system for producing clean water as well as a solar steam generator for medical sterilization in areas without reliable access to electricity or fuel.

=== Biden administration ===
Wang was nominated by President Joe Biden in March 2022 as director of the Advanced Research Projects Agency-Energy of the U.S. Department of Energy. She was confirmed by the United States Senate on December 22, 2022.

=== Vice President for Energy and Climate at MIT ===
Wang was appointed as the Vice President for Energy and Climate at MIT in January 2025 by MIT President Sally Kornbluth. She began in the role on April 1, 2025.

== Awards and honors ==
Wang was awarded the Young Faculty Award by the U.S. Defense Advanced Research Projects Agency in 2008 for the project Tunable Nanostructured Arrays for Stable High-Flux Microchannel Heat Sinks. She was awarded the Air Force Office of Scientific Research Young Investigator Award in 2011, the U.S. Office of Naval Research Young Investigator Award in 2012, and the American Society of Mechanical Engineers (ASME) Bergles-Rohsenow Young Investigator Award in 2012. The ASME gave Wang their Gustus L. Larson Memorial Award in 2017; she is also a Fellow of the ASME. In 2018 she and co-author Omar M. Yaghi won the 8th Prince Sultan bin Abdulaziz International Prize for Water. She was named to the 2021 class of Fellows of the American Association for the Advancement of Science. In 2023 she was elected to the American Academy of Arts and Sciences. In 2025, Wang was elected to the National Academy of Engineering.
