= Shafiqul Islam (academic) =

Bangladeshi American researcher, academic and author

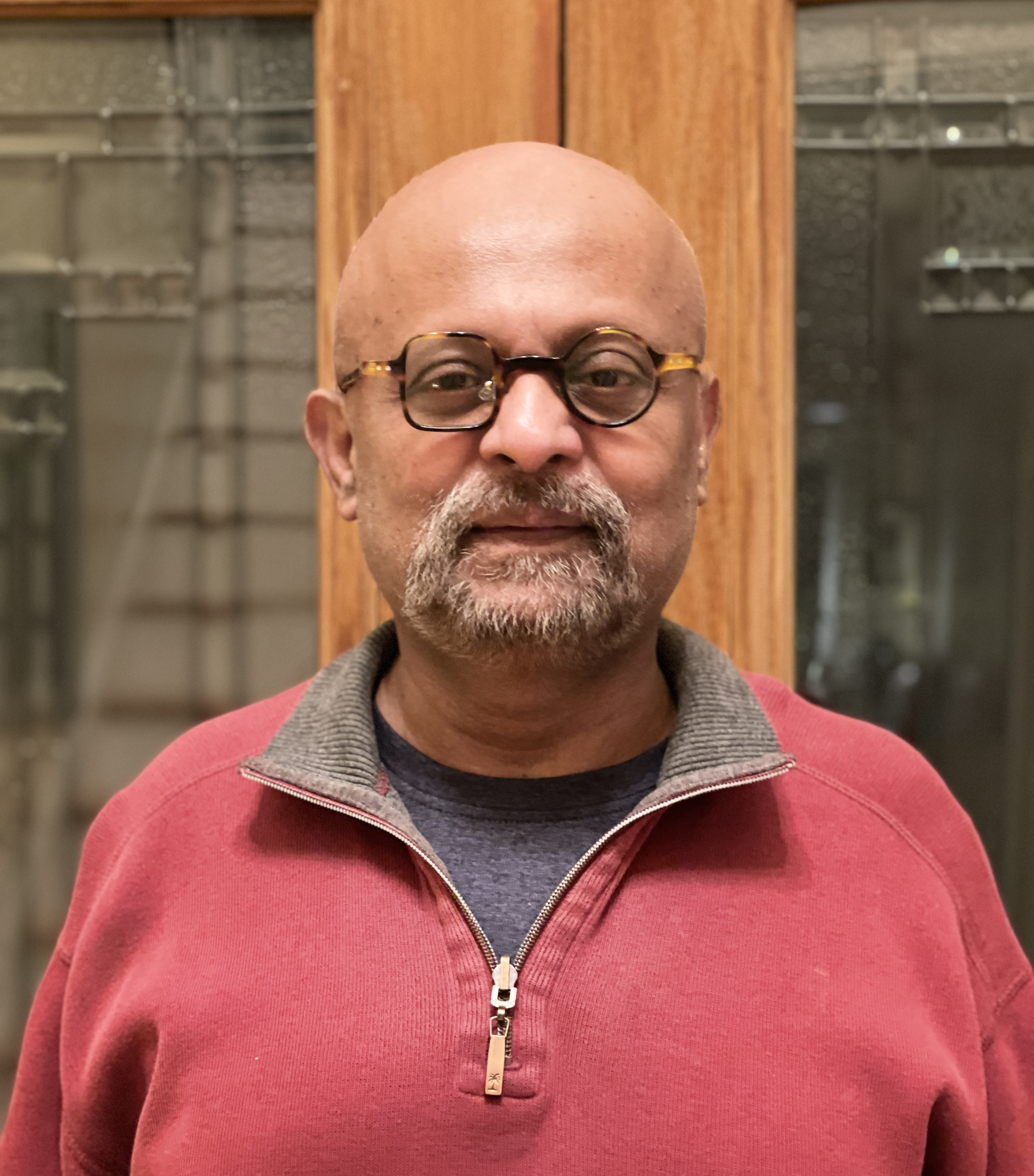
- Born: Bangladesh
- Other name: Shafik Islam
- Occupations: Researcher, academic and author
- Known for: Water diplomacy, Engineering Diplomacy, Climate and Health, Principled Pragmatism

Academic background
- Education: Faujdarhat Cadet College, HSC; Bangladesh University of Engineering and Technology, B.S. Massachusetts Institute of Technology, Sc.D.

Academic work
- Discipline: Water - science, engineering, policy, and politics; Engineering Diplomacy
- Institutions: Tufts University

Shafiqul Islam is a Bangladeshi American researcher, academic and author. He is a professor of civil and environmental engineering and professor of water diplomacy at Tufts University. He serves as the director of water diplomacy. He is also the founding editor of the Water Diplomacy Series.

Islam's work has been focused on availability, access and allocation of water within the context of climate challenges, health, and diplomacy. His work has been significant in the creation of the area of Water diplomacy. He has written over 100 scientific articles and four books.

In 2016, Islam received the Prince Sultan bin Abdulaziz International Prize for Water. He was elected fellow of the American Geophysical Union in 2020.

In 2025, Islam was selected as a Fellow at the Harvard Radcliffe Institute. His fellowship project focuses on advancing the Engineering Diplomacy Framework, which synthesizes scientific reasoning, systems thinking, and negotiation theory to address complex societal challenges. As part of the fellowship, he is working on a book that introduces the concept of a new profession: Engineer-Diplomat. He publishes a regular newsletter on related topics by exploring the application of principled pragmatic approaches in areas such as water governance and management, climate adaptation, infrastructure resilience, and public health.

== Early life and education ==
Islam was born in Bangladesh. He attended Faujdarhat Cadet College and stood First in the combined merit list of all groups. He received his Bachelor of Engineering in Civil Engineering from Bangladesh University of Engineering and Technology (BUET) with Honors. He taught in BUET for a year before moving to the United States. In the United States, he received his Master of Science in Environmental Engineering from the University of Maine.

Islam received his Doctor of Science from the Massachusetts Institute of Technology in 1991. He worked with Rafael L. Bras and Ignacio Rodriguez-Iturbe from hydrology and Edward Lorenz and Kerry Emanuel from meteorology to examine predictability of precipitation for his doctoral dissertation.

== Career ==
Islam joined University of Cincinnati as an assistant professor in 1991, becoming associate professor in 1997 and full professor in 2001. He served as the founding director of Cincinnati Earth Systems Sciences Program from 1995 to 2004 and as the director of Graduate Studies, Department of Civil and Environmental Engineering from 2000 to 2004.

In 2004, Islam left University of Cincinnati and joined Tufts University. There he served as the associate dean of engineering for research from 2006 to 2009. In 2010, he was appointed the director of water diplomacy program. In 2012, Islam became the founding editor of the Water Diplomacy Series. This series has been expanded and renamed as Science Diplomacy: Managing Food, Energy, and Water Sustainability.

Islam's research has been covered in several media outlets, including BBC World Service, New York Times, Boston Globe, World Bank, Vox, The Hague Department of Justice, The Daily Star, and Yale Environment 360.

In 2020, Islam founded D3M@Tufts (Data Driven Decision Making @ Tufts) Program, which synthesizes numbers and narratives to help STEM and non-STEM students to make data driven decisions under uncertainty. This program is funded by the US National Science Foundation. In 2021, Islam was appointed as the Editor of Water Resources Research, a journal of the American Geophysical Union. He has helped initiate a Theory-Practice Synthesis for Actionable Outcomes as a Special Collection for Translational Water Research.

== Research and work ==
=== Water diplomacy ===
In his early career, Islam took two complementary areas of geoscience research: scale issues and remote sensing within the context of climate challenges and water-borne diseases to solve scientific problems. Between 1990 and 2000, he focused on a research strategy that integrated issues of scales with another area: growing availability of multi-sensor data from remote sensing. Later, Islam started focusing on water science and engineering for actionable societal impact.

Islam addressed the problem of water science for societal impact in his first book Water diplomacy: A Negotiated Approach to Managing Complex Water Networks where he suggested that "the solution space for these complex problems - involving interdependent variables, processes, actors, and institutions - can't be pre-stated. Consequently, one can't know what will or can happen with any reasonable certainty. To address these persistent water problems, one needs to start by acknowledging the limits of our knowing to act and the contingent nature of our actions. When neither the certainty of scientific solutions nor the consensus of what solutions to implement exists, what we need is Water Diplomacy." In an NSF funded project, Islam initiated the Water Diplomacy Program. In another NSF funded project, Islam helped to create a Water Diplomacy Research Coordination Network with over 400 water scholars and professionals from 70 countries. A Negotiated Approach to Managing Complex Water Networks was translated in Chinese by the China Ministry of Water Resources and Chinese Research Academy of Environmental Sciences and published by the Science Press of China.

To put the theory of Water Diplomacy Framework into practice, Islam initiated Water Diplomacy Workshop in Boston. His second book Water Diplomacy in Action: Contingent Approaches to Managing Complex Water Problems came out in 2017, followed by Complexity of Transboundary Water Conflicts: Enabling Conditions for Negotiating Contingent Resolutions in 2018. In 2019, he wrote Interdisciplinary Collaboration for Water Diplomacy: A Principled and Pragmatic Approach.

=== Engineering Diplomacy ===
Building on his extensive work in Water Diplomacy, Dr. Islam has started expanding his work into Engineering Diplomacy. He has initiated a newsletter and writes regularly on related topics. His recent work on the role of engineering diplomacy in addressing 2024 flood problems in Bangladesh has been featured in a premier daily newspaper, The Daily Star. The 360Info has published Dr. Islam's take on how Bangladesh has shown how the engineering diplomacy framework for managing the 2024 floods crisis could be a pathway to resilience for many global challenges of our time. His research group has developed several models and tools for flood forecasting across the world and featured here and here.

In a Forum article published by the American Society of Civil Engineers, he argued that for science and engineering to provide the broadest beneficial impact on society, their findings need to be translated by integrating scientific integrity with empathy. Given the intricate coupling of scientific and social facts in shaping collective decision-making, a carefully crafted synthesis of the principles of scientific methods and the pragmatism of social facts is needed. In collective decision-making, scientific facts and social facts complement each other by providing a holistic understanding of the physical and social worlds. Dr. Islam's adherence to synthesizing the notion of social facts with scientific facts in decision-making is not an attempt to define the truth but to agree on a truth that is negotiable and implementable given the capacity, constraints, and context of a problem. He argues that a 'perfect solution' is impossible, and prefers "principled pragmatic interventions that are scientifically defensible, socially acceptable, and politically feasible." Professor Islam's proposed principled pragmatic framework (PPF) suggests the conception, design, implementation, and evaluation of interventions with concrete tasks and activities. A key element of a PPF is fallibilism—the idea that one cannot be sure of anything, and that any intervention needs to be tentative and subject to revision based on changing circumstances.

In February 2025, The Daily Star featured Dr. Islam's take on how engineering diplomacy can address Bangladesh-India water puzzle by synthesizing scientific facts (numbers) with cultural and political contexts (narratives) to create solutions that are technically defensible, societally acceptable, ethically responsible, and politically feasible. Rather than framing the floods merely as a natural disaster or a political weapon, engineering diplomacy would encourage both nations to explore shared interests.

On 15 March 2025, Bangladesh University of Engineering and Technology (BUET) hosted a visionary workshop on Engineering Diplomacy. In this inaugural ceremony, Dr. Islam gave a keynote speech outlining the foundation of a Center of Excellence in Engineering Diplomacy (CEED). The CEED will serve as a hub involving public-private partnerships, other academic institutions, and non-governmental organizations for addressing multi-faceted challenges. The CEED's mission will be aligned with Bangladesh's long-term development goals. The CEED will:

- Develop a theory-practice synthesis of technical problem solving and finesse of Diplomacy to train scientists, engineers, decision-makers, and diplomats.
- Foster cross-sector collaboration between academia, government, and industry.
- Address national, regional, and global challenges by applying principled and pragmatic frameworks to problem-solving.
- Create a problem-focused and solutions-oriented model to prepare Engineer-Diplomats to address multi-faceted challenges of our time.

After the fallout of the Pahalgam attack in May 2025, Islam's take on the conflict was published in The Guardian. He noted the marginalization of Kashmiri voices and argued that it was absolutely necessary to include them in peace dialogue.

=== Climate and health ===
Islam's research group has also looked at the apparently disconnected water problems of cholera and water conflict to provide synthesis of theory and practice of science for measurable societal outcomes. Islam in collaboration Rita Colwell provided an approach to develop a satellite-based cholera prediction model. Islam-Colwell team was awarded the 2016 Prince Sultan bin Abdul Aziz International Water Prize in Creativity at the UN Headquarter in New York by the UN Secretary General. In 2026, Islam chaired a panel hosted by Harvard's Mittal Institute called "From Thinking and Feeling to Doing in a Climate-Changed South Asia" during a conference surrounding the interdependence of human communities and the environment.

=== 2024 Anti-discrimination Students Movement ===
Professor Islam has contributed with several articles to inform and influence the unprecedented student-public-led anti-discrimination movement that started in July 2024. His views on Bangladesh's path to principled governance emphasized that there is a deep and growing disconnect between the elites and the vast majority of Bangladesh in an Op-Ed published by The Daily Star. This detachment has only grown as technology and social media have made the lifestyles of the elite more visible, amplifying the sense of injustice and inequality. By carefully examining examples of the two types of democracies in other countries and focusing on actionable, context-specific strategies, Bangladesh can synthesize a governance model that works for its people—Boishamma Birodhee Jonogan (BBJ)—a regime that upholds equity, inclusion, and justice while remaining pragmatic in its implementation.

Dr. Islam provided a nuanced assessment of Chief Adviser Dr. Yunus's national speech on August 25, 2024 in The Daily Star. He suggested that the speech was remarkable not only for what it said but for how it was delivered—free of arrogance, malice or personal gratification. Instead, it was a call to action, focusing on the urgent need for national unity and the commitment to building a new, democratic, and inclusive. He also cautioned that to build and sustain public trust, the government must prioritize meaningful reforms over superficial actions, avoiding the appearance of arbitrary decisions in recent high-profile arrest cases. Citizens aren't looking for quick fixes; they want a sustainable, principled approach that respects the complexity of the task. Using the journey metaphor, Dr. Islam suggested that building the nation from Tetulia to Teknaf isn't about instant results, but about starting with a strong foundation of principles and pragmatism.

In another piece published by the BDNews24, he floated a proposal titled Bangladesh 2.0 to begin a national dialogue to envision a new Bangladesh – a path for principled, pragmatic governance. He proposed that this is an opportune time to build on the past, present, culture, and heritage of the nation with a vision that is actionable, adaptive, fair, just, and inclusive.

Bangladesh faced a formidable double challenge in August 2024. In a piece published by 360Info, Dr. Islam articulated how Bangladesh's flood response can turn a crisis into cooperation. Bangladesh has shown how its engineering diplomacy approach to managing a flood crisis could be a pathway to resilience. Engineering diplomacy offers a framework for navigating these complexities, turning potential conflicts into opportunities for cooperation. As the world confronts the escalating threats of climate change, the lessons from Bangladesh's 2024 floods are clear. The global community must embrace a new approach —one that blends technical expertise with diplomatic finesse to build a more resilient, cooperative global community. Engineering diplomacy provides a path forward, not just for managing disasters but for crafting a future where nations work together to tackle shared challenges.

== Awards and honors ==
- 2001 - Senior Fulbright Scholar
- 2004 - Distinguished Senior Faculty Research Award, Engineering, University of Cincinnati
- 2004 - Bernard M. Gordon Senior Faculty Fellow in Engineering, Tufts University
- 2016 - Prince Sultan Bin Abdulaziz International Water Prize in Creativity
- 2016 – Remarkable Feats: National Recognition Award, The Daily Star, Bangladesh
- 2020 - Fellow, American Geophysical Union.
- 2025 – Radcliffe Fellow, Harvard University.
