= Inter Services Selection Board =

Inter Services Selection Board may refer to:

- Inter Services Selection Board (Bangladesh), military organisation in Bangladesh
- Inter Services Selection Board (Pakistan), military organisation in Pakistan
