= Faujdarhat Cadet College =

Military high school in Bangladesh

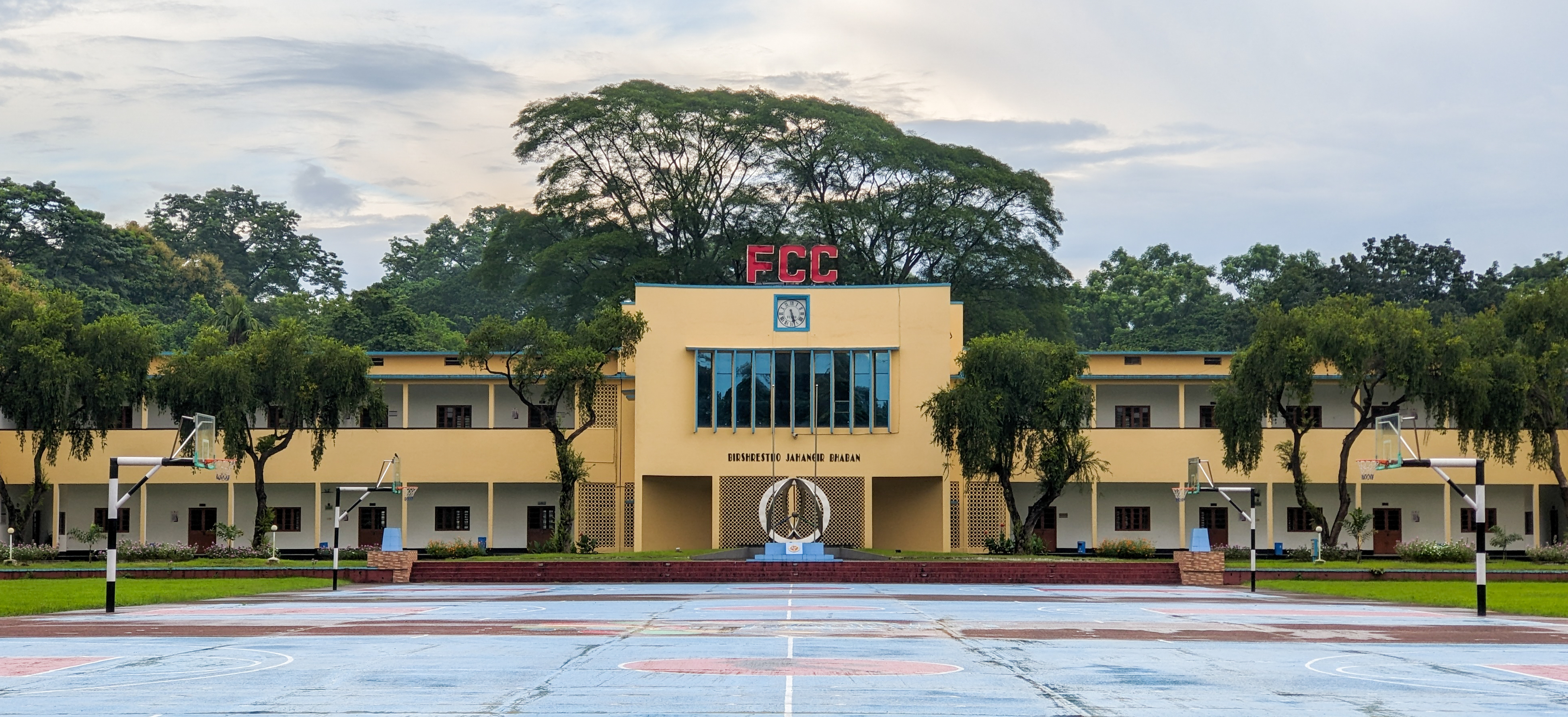
- Bir Sreshtha Jahangir Academic Block

Location
- Sitakunda, Chittagong, Bangladesh; Chittagong, Bangladesh, 5404; 22.4000°N 91.7624°E

Information
- Former name: East Pakistan Cadet College
- Motto: Deeds not Words (বাংলা: কথা নয় কাজ)
- Established: 28 April 1958; 68 years ago
- School board: Board of Intermediate and Secondary Education, Chittagong
- Principal: MD.Yeasin (Acting)
- Adjutant: Major Ihsan Ul Haque Shaan
- Language: English
- Area: 185 acres (750,000 m^{2})
- Color: Royal Blue
- Demonym: Faujian
- First Principal: Sir William Maurice Brown
- EIIN: 105116
- Website: fcc.army.mil.bd

Faujdarhat Cadet College is a historic public military high school being the first of its kind in Bangladesh (then East Pakistan) and second in entire Pakistan, modelled after public schools in the UK (according to the Public Schools Act 1868), run following the national curriculum of Bangladesh in English medium, financed partially by the Bangladesh Army, located at Faujdarhat, near Chittagong, in Bangladesh.

== History ==
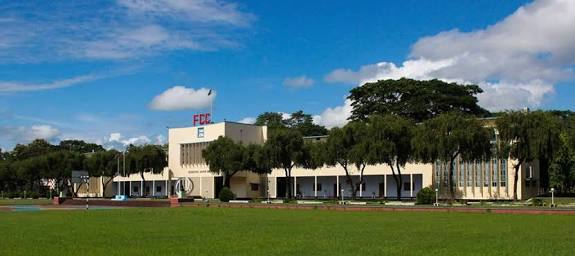
Campus building of Faujdarhat Cadet College

Faujdarhat Cadet College was the first cadet college to be established by Field Marshal Muhammad Ayub Khan in erstwhile East Pakistan facing the Bay of Bengal. The government spent 40 lakh taka behind the project and it was opened on 28 April 1958 by Brigadier General Qurban Ali. The classes started with 60 students in the seventh and eighth grade. Two sons of the then Chief Minister of East Pakistan, Ataur Rahman Khan, were part of the inaugural cohort of the school. The school was known as East Pakistan Cadet College until 1965, when three new cadet colleges were established. The school has an area of 185 acres, making it the largest high school in Bangladesh. The school was designed by Joynul Abedin.

After independence in 1971, Tofail Ahmed attempted to introduce Awami League's student politics in the school. As he convened a meeting to discuss the prospects with students, senior students of the school boycotted it. The consequences that followed were the enactment of a new policy to convert the four existing cadet colleges to government residential colleges. Cadets from all colleges led by Faujdarhat started "Keep Cadet College Campaign". They met with the then chairman of the cadet college governing body, Brigadier Ziaur Rahman who arranged a meeting for them with M. A. G. Osmani who was then the part of Sheikh Mujib's cabinet. Osmani talked with Prime Minister Sheikh Mujib and convinced him to repeal the new policy.

From 2003, the cadet colleges in Bangladesh were converted to the English version of the National Curriculum.

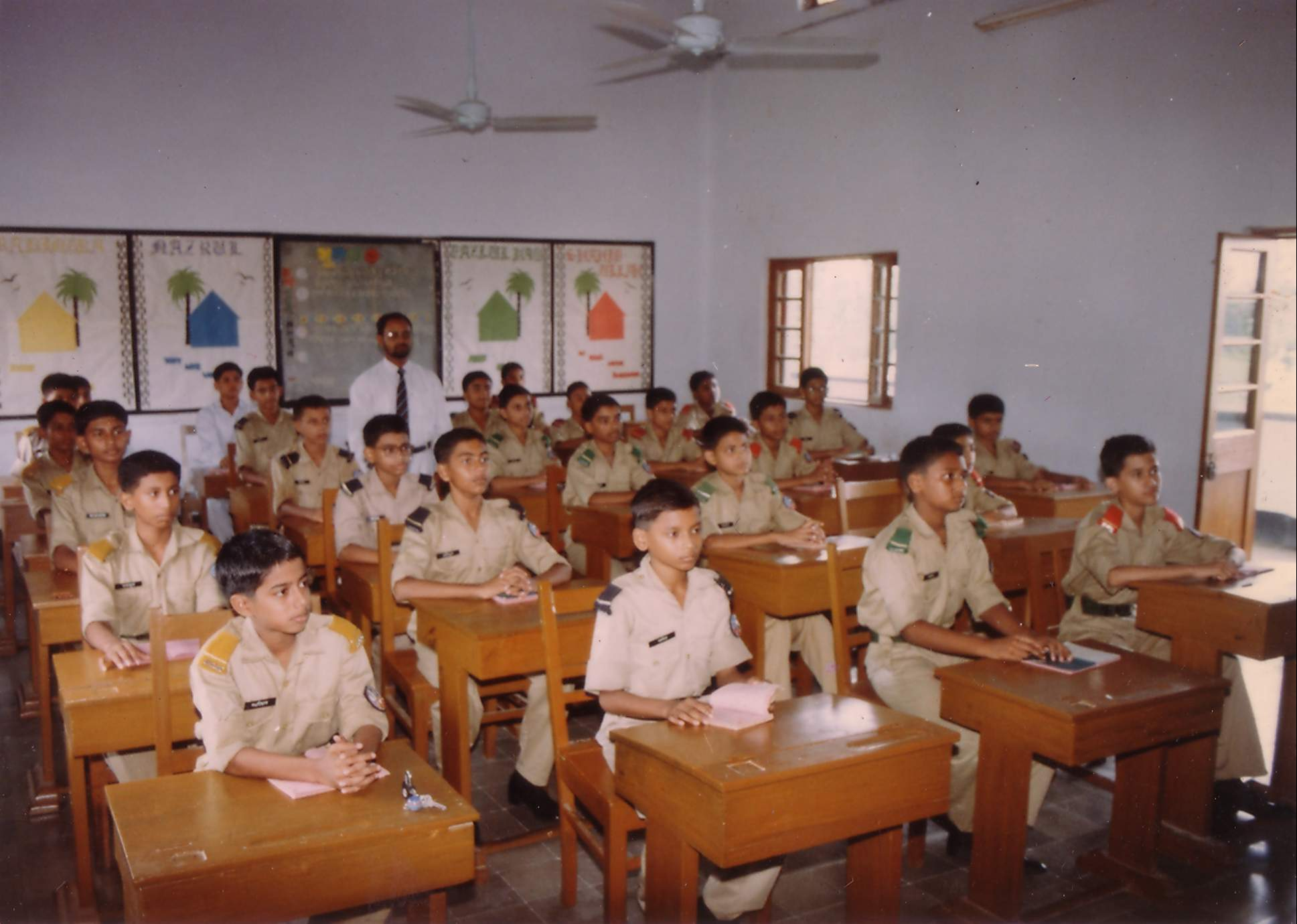
Cadets in class room

== Academic system ==
Faujdarhat Cadet College boards up to 300 boys for grades 7 to 12. Every year, around 50 students are admitted to the college at grade 7 through a nationwide admission test composed of written (Bangla, English, Mathematics, General Knowledge), interviews and Medical Examinations,combindly with all other cadet colleges in Bangladesh.

Cadets are enrolled in class 7 of the Bangladesh National Curriculum and continue their study for six years up to the end of higher secondary or college level (high school in international standard). They follow the English version syllabus of the National Curriculum and Textbook Board.

== Reunion programs ==
The reunion in 2014 was a notable event, as the Armed Forces also lent a hand in organizing this extravagant 3-day event. The Alumni endowed the college with their support in building new infrastructure and residential facilities, as well as carrying out the large event, which was held from 25 December to 27 December.

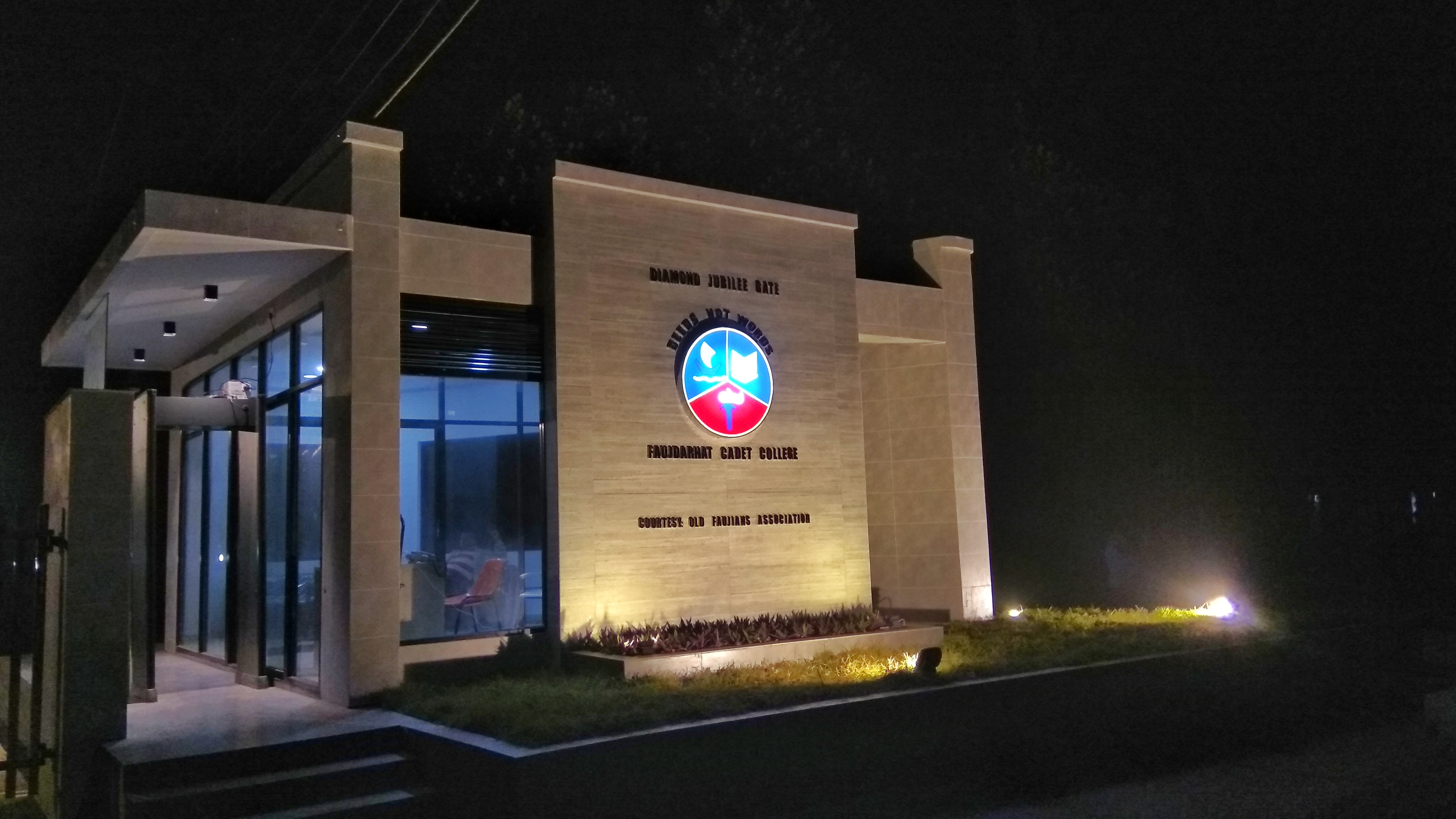
Diamond Jubilee Gate of Faujdarhat Cadet College

On 18 January 2018, the Old Faujians Association (alumni association of the college) organized an event called Diamond Jubilee Reunion. Chief of Army Staff, General Abu Belal Muhammad Shafiul Haque inaugurated the event. The program lasted for three days. It started on 18 January and ended on 20 January. On the second day of the program, the legendary singer of this subcontinent, Runa Laila performed on the occasion.

== Alumni ==
=== Government and politics ===
Name	Class year	Notability	Reference(s)
Kazi Rakibuddin Ahmad		Chief Election Commissioner of Bangladesh	
Barrister Anisul Islam Mahmud		Eminent lawyer, Politician, Academician, Former President of Bangladesh Cricket Board (BCB), Former Minister and Member of Parliament	
Hossain Zillur Rahman		Former Advisor, Bangladesh Caretaker Government	
Imran Ahmad		Politician and Businessman, Minister of Bangladesh	
Syed Muhammad Ibrahim		Bir Protik, Chairman of Bangladesh Kalyan Party	
A. J. Mohammad Ali		Former Attorney General of Bangladesh	
Fazle Kabir		Former Governor of Bangladesh Bank (country's central bank)	

=== Military and diplomacy ===
Name	Class year	Notability	Reference(s)
Lieutenant General Abu Saleh Mohammad Nasim		8th Chief of Bangladesh Army	
General Iqbal Karim Bhuiyan		15th Chief of Bangladesh Army	
Major Gen AMSA Amin		Ambassador to Russia and Brazil	
Major Gen Mia Mohammad Zainul Abedin		Military Secretary to Prime Minister from 2011 to 2019	
Vice Admiral Mohammad Moyeenul Haque		Assistant Chief of Naval Staff (Material)	
Brigadier General Sharif Uddin Ahmed		President of the Inter Services Selection Board	

=== Academia and science ===
Name	Class year	Notability	Reference(s)
Mohammad Ataul Karim		Provost and Executive Vice Chancellor of the University of Massachusetts Dartmouth with expertise in electro-optical systems, optical computing, and pattern recognition	
Gowher Rizvi		The second Bangladeshi Rhodes Scholar. He is a former international affairs adviser to the prime minister of Bangladesh. He taught at University of Oxford and Harvard Kennedy School	
A. M. M. Safiullah		Vice Chancellor, Bangladesh University of Engineering & Technology	
Shafiqul Islam		Professor at Tufts University. Graduate of Massachusetts Institute of Technology.	

=== Culture, entertainment and sports ===
Name	Class year	Notability	Reference(s)
Shakoor Majid		Ekushey Padak, the second-highest state award winner travel novelist	

== See also ==
- Military College Jhelum
- Cadet College Hasan Abdal
- Cadet College Swat
