= Herman Bouwer =

Dutch-born American hydrological scientist

- Bouwer in 1975
- Born: 1927
- Died: July 28, 2013 (aged 85–86); Phoenix, Arizona
- Education: Cornell University
- Known for: groundwater management, aquifer recharge and reuse
- Awards: Walter L. Huber Research Prize; Prince Sultan bin Abdulaziz International Prize for Water
- Scientific career
- Institutions: U.S. Water Conservation Laboratory; Arizona State University; Arizona University

Natural processes of groundwater flow and recharge

Herman Bouwer (1927–2013) was a hydrological scientist who worked in groundwater hydrology and water resources management, with a specialization in the area of Managed Aquifer Recharge (MAR). He was born in the Netherlands and moved to the United States in 1952 to study for his PhD at Cornell University. He went on to work at the U.S. Water Conservation Laboratory, U.S. Dept. of Agriculture, serving as director from 1972 to 1990. His research efforts on characterizing and modeling the movement of water and pollutants in the vadose zone and groundwater resulted in field and analytical methods that are used in the groundwater sciences. He authored or co-authored over 300 publications and wrote the textbook Groundwater Hydrology.

As a hydrogeologist, Bouwer is credited as "one of the first to bridge the gap between engineering, soil physics, and hydrogeology."

== Early life and education ==
Herman Bouwer was born and raised in Haarlem, the Netherlands, in 1927, and was a teenager under German occupation during World War II.

After the war, Bouwer enrolled in the Agricultural University in Wageningen, Netherlands, and received a BS degree and a MS degree in drainage and irrigation in 1952. As a graduate student at Cornell University he conducted research in how to drain the waterlogged soils of central New York and received his PhD in agricultural and civil engineering and agronomy in 1955.

== Career ==
He accepted a faculty position in the Agricultural Engineering Department at Auburn University, where he also served as an associate agricultural engineer for the Auburn Agricultural Experiment Station. In Auburn, he conducted research on unsaturated flow using resistance network analogs to solve soil physics problems prior to the development of analytical and numerical models in the groundwater sciences in the 1970s and 1980s.

In 1959, Bouwer took a position at the U.S. Water Conservation Laboratory in Phoenix, Arizona; in that position he analyzed surface water/ground water interactions including seepage from irrigation canals, groundwater mounding below groundwater recharge facilities, the effect of mounding on groundwater recharge rates and effect of ground water pumping on stream flow. Using analog resistance networks, he developed several field methods for measuring saturated hydraulic conductivity to include the double tube permeameter, falling head seepage meter, pit bailing method, air entry permeameter, Bouwer-Rice slug test in unconfined aquifers, and the single-ring cylinder infiltrometer with correction for lateral divergence and hydraulic gradients.

Bouwer helped to develop the science and application of managed aquifer recharge (MAR) and soil aquifer treatment (SAT) in the United States. His MAR and SAT research started in 1967 with the construction of the Flushing Meadows project in the dry Salt River bed in Phoenix. This was a field laboratory to study groundwater recharge using secondary treated sewage effluent. The research included studies on hydraulic loading rates, soil clogging, virus and bacteria removal, nutrient removal, nitrification-denitrification reactions, and trace organics and pharmaceutical products. His research demonstrated that soil and biological interactions in the river bed improved the sewage effluent water quality and could be adjusted through SAT wetting and drying cycles. Groundwater recharge and reuse, including potable use, would become the focus of much of his work and interests for the rest of his career.

His research work had a major impact on groundwater issues in the American Southwest and in Arizona in particular. His methods using managed soil-beds to filter treated sewage effluent (greywater) to the degree that it can be reused to irrigate food crops was able to "stretch" the city of Phoenix's "water supply at half the per gallon cost." Additionally non-soil-bed treated effluence can be used for non-edible crops like cotton. The Arizona Reporter newspaper wrote that his technology could "boost Phoenix's annual freshwater supply by as much as 40,000 acre feet. By 1967 the Salt River Project Flushing Meadows recharge field was producing 70,000 acre feet of filtered water for non-food crops, and at that time it was expected to treat up to 300,000 acre feet. The pilot plant consisted of a series of 6 recharge basins, each being 700 feet long by 20 feet wide. After percolating ten feet below the surface the water, it was purified, however Bouwer recommended at least 30 feet of percolation for safety considerations. Bouwer stated of the project that the earth "has always been nature's water purifier." By 1980, the technology developed to the degree that effluent water was re-purified through nanofiltration methods, recharged via injection wells into the ground and stored in aquifers.

During his lifetime, Bouwer authored or co-authored over 300 journal articles, wrote 12 book chapters. and also taught as an adjunct faculty member of both the University of Arizona and Arizona State University. He contributed many scientific articles to the journal Groundwater. As an educator, he taught courses and held seminars on artificially-engineered groundwater recharge in North Africa (Morocco, Tunisia) the Middle East (Jordan), India and the United States. He also traveled to other countries, including Cyprus, Morocco and India, to teach waste-water reuse techniques. In the U.S., Bouwer advised other states, for example Florida, on sewage disposal through soil-percolation reclamation processes. His textbook, Groundwater Hydrology, was published in 1978 by McGraw-Hill.

He died on July 28, 2013, at the age of 86 from Parkinson's disease complications.

== Awards ==
Bouwer received two USDA Superior Service Awards; the Walter L. Huber Civil Engineering Research Prize from the American Society of Civil Engineers; the Prince Sultan bin Abdulaziz International Prize for Water in 2004 in the area of artificial groundwater recharge; the Arizona Hydrological Society Lifetime Achievement Award; and the National Ground Water Association Life Member Award in 1992 for his service contributions to the field of groundwater. He received, in 2007, a Lifetime Achievement Award at the 6th International Symposium on Managed Aquifer Recharge. The United States Department of Agriculture named Bouwer a Scientist of the Year.

== Legacy ==
Bower is considered to be one of the first hydrogeologists "to bridge the gap between engineering, soil physics, and hydrogeology. "

Bouwer helped to establish the Biennial Symposium on Managed Aquifer Recharge (BSMAR), the International Symposium on Managed Aquifer Recharge (ISMAR), the Arizona Hydrological Society (AHS) and AHS Foundation.

The Herman Bouwer Award is named for him; it was established in 2000 by the Groundwater Resources Association of California and the Arizona Hydrological Society. The award is a scholarship for students in the field of hydrology and water resources.
