= Sharif Uddin Ahmed (general) =

Bangladeshi military officer

- Born: c. 1945; Feni, Bengal Province, Bangladesh
- Died: 28 April 2022 (aged 76–77); Dhaka, Bangladesh
- Military career
- Allegiance: Pakistan (before 1973); Bangladesh
- Branch: Pakistan Army; Bangladesh Army
- Service years: 1968 -1993
- Rank: Brigadier General
- Unit: East Bengal Regiment
- Commands: President of Inter Services Selection Board; Station Commander, Dacca; Commander of 65th Infantry Brigade; Commander of 93rd Armoured Brigade
- Awards: Legion of Merit

Sharif Uddin Ahmed (1945 – 28 April 2022) was a Bangladeshi one star military. Over a 25-year career, he held several senior command and staff appointments in the Bangladesh Army. He served as the country's military attaché to the United States, where he received the Legion of Merit.

== Early life and education ==
Ahmed was born in 1945 in Noakhali District, Bengal Province, British India (present-day Feni District, Bangladesh). He studied at Faujdarhat Cadet College as part of its 6th batch. After completing his Higher Secondary Certificate examinations, he joined the Pakistan Military Academy as a cadet of the 39th PMA Long Course.

== Career ==
Ahmed served in a range of command and staff roles throughout his military career. As a lieutenant colonel, he worked as a grade one staff officer in an infantry division and later commanded the 5 East Bengal Regiment. He also served as the personal secretary to the chief of army staff and later personal secretary to President Hussain Muhammad Ershad.

After his promotion to colonel, Ahmed commanded the Bangladesh Army's only armoured brigade from 1984 to 1985. As a brigadier general, he was appointed military attaché to the United States, serving from 1985 to 1989. During this assignment, he was awarded the Legion of Merit by the president of the United States. He was the chief martial law administrator of Pabna District, Sirajganj District, Rajshahi District, Natore District, Naogaon District and Chapai Nawabganj District.

Following his return to Bangladesh, Ahmed commanded an infantry brigade in the Chittagong Hill Tracts during counterinsurgency operations. He later served as the military secretary of the Bangladesh Army and as president of the Inter Services Selection Board.

== Death ==
Ahmed died on 28 April 2022.
