= Mohammad Adil Chowdhury =

Retired Bangladeshi two-star general

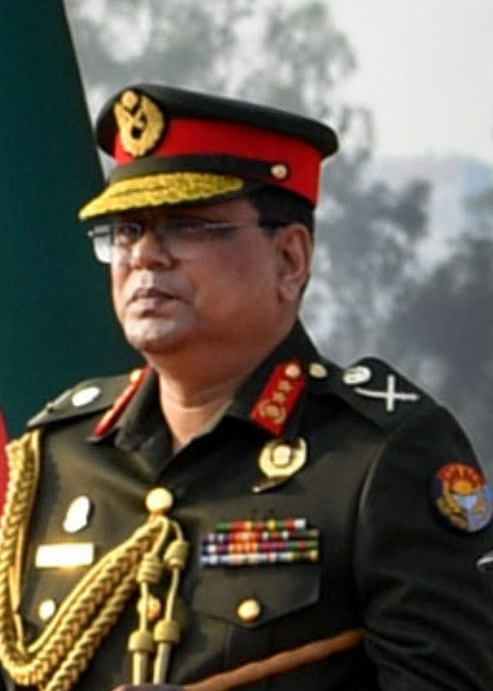
- Military career
- Allegiance: Bangladesh
- Branch: Bangladesh Army
- Service years: 1990-2026
- Rank: Major General
- Unit: East Bengal Regiment
- Commands: Military Secretary to President; GOC of 19th Infantry Division; President of Inter Service Selection Board

Mohammad Adil Chowdhury, ndc,psc is a retired two-star officer of the Bangladesh army. He once served as the military secretary to the president of Bangladesh (MSP).

== Military career ==
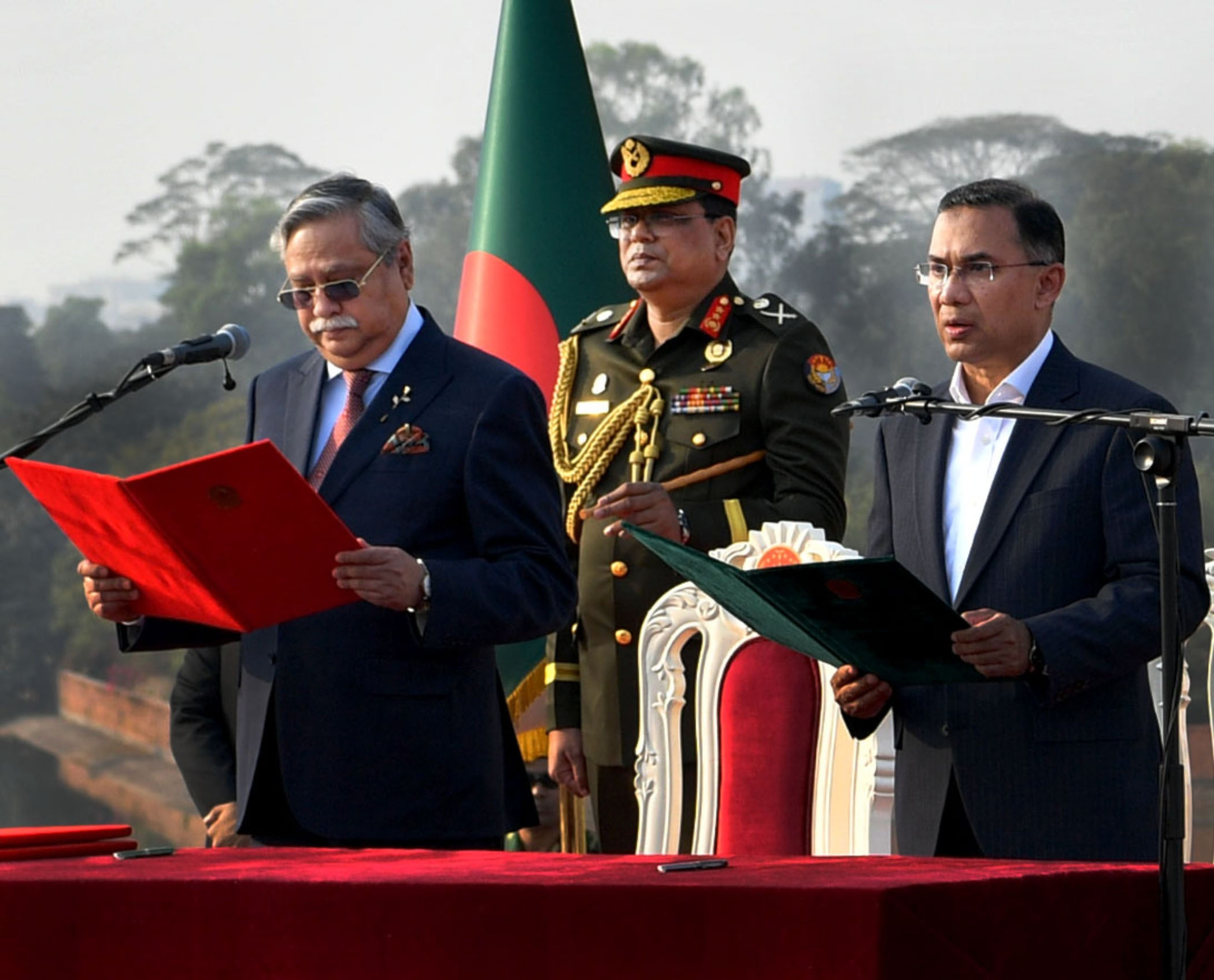
Chowdhury during PM Rahman's swearing-in ceremony

Chowdhury was commissioned in the 22nd BMA Long Course in the Corps of Infantry. He completed the National Defence Course (ndc) from the National Defence College in 2019.

As brigadier general, he served as president of the Inter-Services Selection Board (ISSB). As major general, he served as the GOC of the 19th Infantry Division at Ghatail. He served as military secretary to President Mohammed Shahabuddin.

He retired from military service in 2026.
