= Marconnet =

Marconnet is a surname of French origin. Notable people with the surname include:

- Alain Marconnet (1945–1990), French association football player
- Amy Marconnet, American mechanical engineer
- Christelle Marconnet, on the 1994 France women's national artistic gymnastics team
- Georges Marconnet, 1908 inventor of a valveless pulsejet engine
- Sylvain Marconnet (born 1976), French rugby union footballer

== See also ==
- Aristide Marconnet, fictional character in 1955 British comedy film To Paris with Love
- Senator Marconnet, fictional character in French thriller AKA (2023 film)
