= ISSB =

ISSB may refer to:

- Inter Services Selection Board (Bangladesh)
- Inter Services Selection Board (Pakistan)
- International Sustainability Standards Board
