= Qiuhua Liang =

Chinese academic and researcher

- Born: 28 August 1974 (age 51); Guangdong, China
- Education: Dalian University of Technology, China; University of Oxford, UK
- Engineering career
- Discipline: Flood risk engineering Water engineering
- Employer(s): Newcastle University; Loughborough University

Professor Qiuhua Liang is an academic and researcher specialising in water engineering and flood risk management. He holds the position of Professor of Water Engineering at Loughborough University and is the UNESCO Chair in Informatics and Multi-hazard Risk Reduction.

== Career ==
Professor Liang received his BEng in civil engineering from Dalian University of Technology, China in 1997, and obtained his DPhil from the University of Oxford in 2005. He has since worked in computational hydraulics and flood modelling. He became a lecturer of hydraulic engineering at Newcastle University in 2006, and was promoted to senior lecturer in 2011 and full professor in Hydrosystems Modelling in 2013. In 2018, he joined Loughborough University as Chair Professor in Water Engineering, and was appointed the UNESCO Chair in Informatics and Multi-hazard Risk Reduction in 2023, recognising his contributions to the field. Professor Liang is also a Co-director of the EPSRC Centre for Doctoral Training Water-WISER. He was elected as a Fellow of the Royal Academy of Engineering in 2024. In July 2024, he received the Prince Sultan bin Abdulaziz International Prize for Water, for innovation in water research.

== Research ==
His work focuses on developing high-performance mathematical and numerical models for flood simulation and forecasting. Liang has made contributions to real-time flood forecasting by coupling GPU-accelerated hydrodynamic models with numerical weather predictions. His research encompasses various aspects of flood modelling, including urban flood simulations, dam-break scenarios, and the integration of multiple data sources. Liang's approaches, such as using deep convolutional neural networks for rapid flood prediction, are used for flood risk management.
