= Kang L. Wang =

Taiwanese physicist (born 1941)

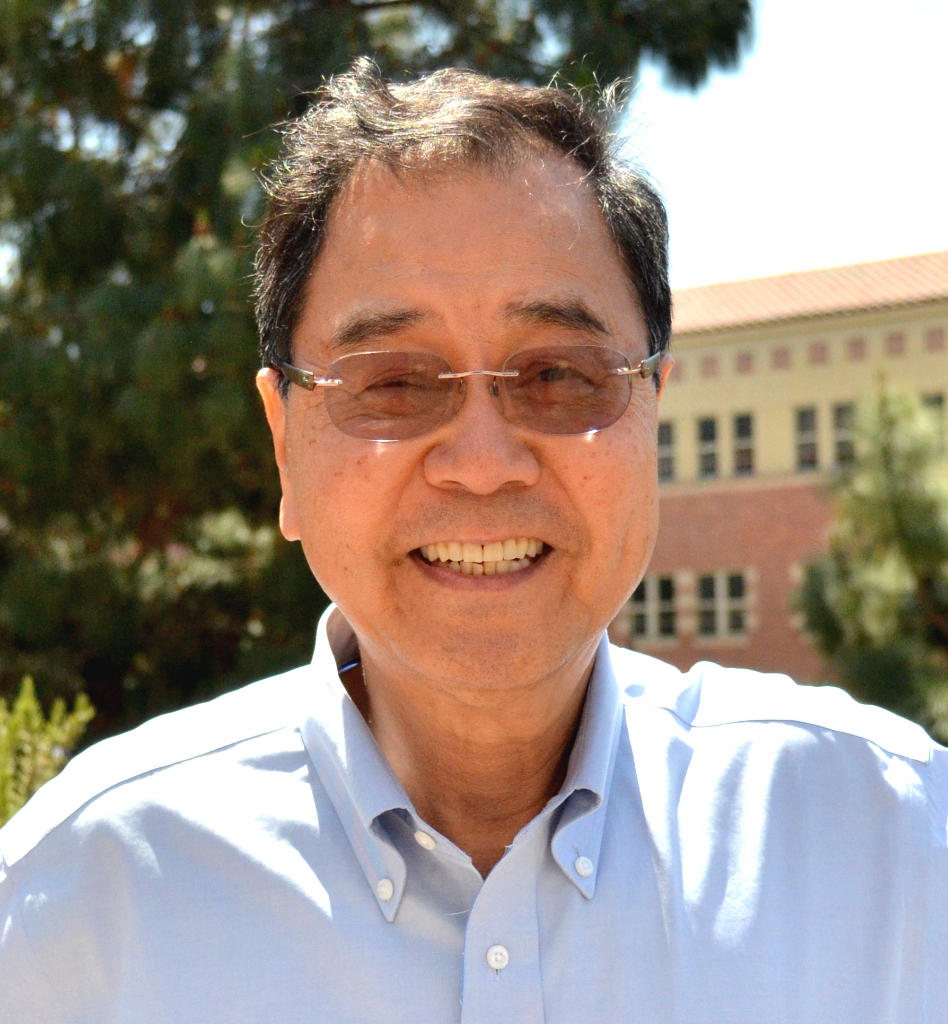
- Born: 1942 (age 83–84); Lukang, Changhua, Taiwan
- Education: National Cheng Kung University (BS); Massachusetts Institute of Technology (MS, PhD)
- Children: 3, including Evelyn
- Scientific career
- Fields: Electrical engineering
- Workplaces: University of California, Los Angeles; Academia Sinica
- Thesis: Electron impact ionization cross sections for carbon vapor (1970)
- Doctoral advisor: C. K. Crawford

Chinese name
- Chinese: 王康隆
Transcriptions
Standard Mandarin
- Hanyu Pinyin: Wáng Kānglóng

Kang Lung Wang (Chinese: 王康隆; born 1941) is a Taiwanese physicist and electrical engineer specializing in nanotechnology, semiconductors, and quantum systems. He is the Raytheon Chair in Electrical Engineering at the University of California, Los Angeles (UCLA), where he leads its Device Research Laboratory. He was previously a professor at the Massachusetts Institute of Technology (MIT).

== Early life and education ==
Wang was born in Lukang, Changhua, Taiwan, in 1941. After high school, he graduated from National Cheng Kung University with a B.S. in 1964. He then earned an M.S. and his Ph.D. from the Massachusetts Institute of Technology (MIT) in 1966 and 1970, respectively. His doctoral dissertation was titled, "Electron impact ionization cross sections for carbon vapor".

== Academic career ==
After receiving his doctorate, Wang was an assistant professor at the Massachusetts Institute of Technology from 1970 to 1972. He then worked as a physicist and engineer at the General Electric Research Laboratory from 1972 to 1979. Since 1979, he has been a professor at the University of California, Los Angeles (UCLA), and from 1993 to 1996 he served as the chair of the electrical engineering department at UCLA. From 2000 to 2002, he was dean of the School of Engineering at the Hong Kong University of Science and Technology. Between 2003 and 2013, he served as Director of the MARCO Focus Center on Functional Engineered Nano-Architectonics, and from 2007 to 2013 he was also Associate Director of the California NanoSystems Institute. From 2006 to the present, he has held the position of Raytheon Chair Professor of Physical Electronics and served as Director of the Western Institute of Nanoelectronics. He was the editor-in-chief of IEEE Transactions on Nanotechnology from 2011 to 2014.

Wang serves on the editorial board of the Encyclopedia of Nanoscience and Nanotechnology (American Scientific publishers). He currently also serves as the Director of Marco Focus Center on Functional Engineered Nano Architectonics, an interdisciplinary research center funded by Semiconductor Industry Association and the Department of Defense to address the need of information processing technology beyond scaled CMOS.

He is also the director of the Western Institute of Nanoelectronics (WIN), a coordinated multi-project research institute. WIN is funded by the NRI, Intel, and the State of California. The current on-going projects are aimed at spintronics for low power applications. He currently serves as the editor-in-chief for the journal IEEE Transactions on Nanotechnology. He was also the founding director of Nanoelectronics Research Facility at UCLA (established in 1989). In addition to these technical leadership contributions, he has provided academic leadership in engineering education. He was also the Dean of Engineering from 2000 to 2002 at the Hong Kong University of Science and Technology.

== Research ==
Wang's research activities focus on nanotechnology and semiconductor nano devices. Specific topics include:

- nanoscale science: nanoelectronics, nanoarchitectures, and nanomagnetics
- spintronic materials and devices
- quantum systems: self-assembly growth of quantum structures and cooperative assembly of quantum dot arrays; electron spin and coherence properties of SiGe and InAs quantum structures for implementation of spin-based quantum information
- silicon-based molecular beam epitaxy; nano-epitaxy of hetero-structures
- nonvolatile electronics and low-dissipation devices
- optoelectronics, solar cells, and microwave devices

He was the inventor of strained layer MOSFET, quantum SRAM cell, and band-aligned superlattices. He holds 45 patents and has published over 700 papers.

In 2018, the International Union of Pure and Applied Physics (IUPAP) recognized Wang for his discovery of chiral Majorana fermions and his contributions to spintronics.

== Awards and recognition ==
2018: Magnetism award and Nēel Medal, International Union of Pure and Applied Physics

2018: Laureate of Industrial Technology Research Institute, Taiwan

2018: Dr. Dan S. Louie lifetime achievement award

2017: J. J. Ebers Award by IEEE International Electron Devices Society

2017: Fellow, APS (American Physical Society)

2016: Academician of Academia Sinica, Taiwan

2015: Pan Wen Yuan Outstanding Research Award, Hsinchu, Taiwan

2012: Outstanding Alumni Award of National Cheng Kung University, Taiwan

2009: Semiconductor Industry Award Research Award

2007: IBM Faculty Award

1996: Semiconductor Research Corporation Technical Excellency Award

1992: Fellow, IEEE (Institute of Electrical and Electronics)

1987–88: Guggenheim Fellow Award, Max Planck Institute, Germany

== Personal life ==
Wang met his wife, Edith Wang, while they were both graduate students at MIT. They have two sons and a daughter, Evelyn Wang.

== Books ==
- Wang, K.L. and Ovchinnikov, I., "Nanoelectronics and Nanospintronics: Fundamentals and Materials Perspective", In: Advances in Electronic Materials, Kasper, E., Mussig, H- J. and Grimmeiss, H. (Eds.), Trans Tech Publications, Switzerland, Vol. 608, pp. 133–158 (2009)
- Wang, K.L., Galatsis, K., Ostroumov, R., Ozkan, M., Likharev, K. and Botros, Y., "Chapter 10: Nanoarchitectonics: Advances in Nanoelectronics", In: Handbook of Nanoscience, Engineering, and Technology, Second Edition, Goddard, W., Brenner, D.W., Lyshevski, S.E. and Iafrate, G.J. (Eds.), CRC Press, pp. 10.1–10.24 (2007)
- Eshaghian-Wilner, M. M., Flood, A. H., Khitun, A., Stoddart, J. F., Wang, K.L., "Chapter 14. Molecular and Nanoscale Computing and Technology", In: Handbook of Nature- Inspired and Innovative Computing: Integrating Classical Models with Emerging Technologies, Zomaya, A.Y. (Ed.), USA: Springer-Verlag, 477–510 (2006)
- Wang, K.L. and Balandin, A.A., editors, The Handbook of Semiconductor Nanostructures and Nanodevices, America Scientific Publishers, 2005
