= Prince Sultan Research Center for Environment, Water and Desert =

Prince Sultan Institute for Environmental, Water and Desert Research معهد الأمير سلطان لأبحاث البيئة والمياه والصحراء
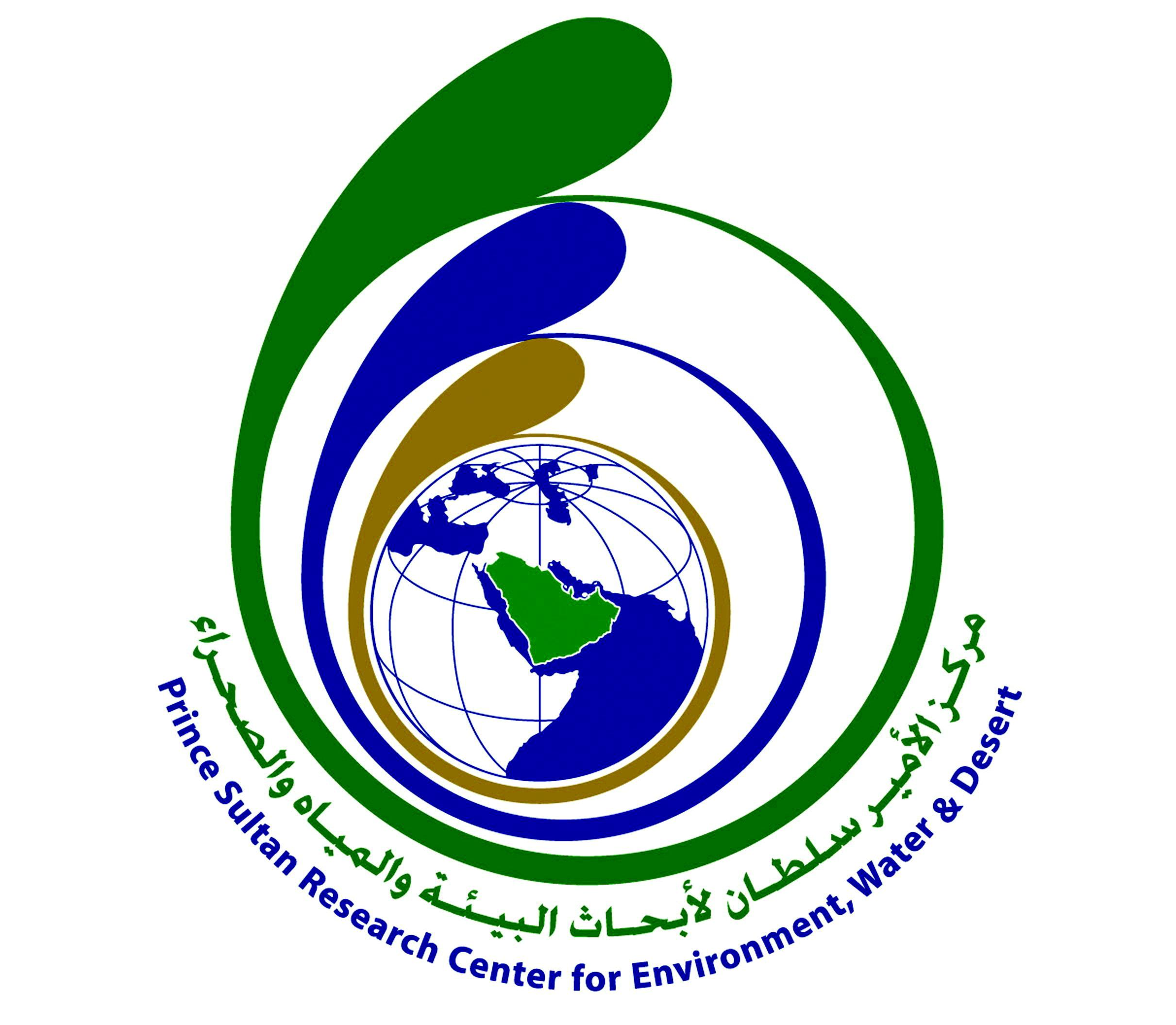
- Abbreviation: PSIEWDR
- Formation: 1986
- Headquarters: King Saud University, Riyadh
- Location: Saudi Arabia
- Region served: Saudi Arabia
- Director: Abdul Malek Al al-Shaikh
- Website: http://www.psrcewd.edu.sa
- Formerly called: Prince Sultan Research Center for Environment, Water and Desert

The Prince Sultan Institute for Environmental, Water and Desert Research is a Saudi Institute was established in 1986 under the name "Center for Desert Studies". It is as an independently administered research organization directly linked to the rector's office of King Saud University. The Institute's purpose is to design and conduct scientific research which is related to desert development and to combating desertification in the Arabian Peninsula.

The Institute is active in the environmental application of remote sensing technologies and maintains its own Remote Sensing Unit equipped with GIS and advanced programs for satellite image processing. In 2007, the Institute published the Space Image Atlas of the Kingdom of Saudi Arabia ISBN 9960-57-011-8, which it produced in partnership with the Space Research Institute of King Abdulaziz City for Science & Technology and Geospace Austria.

The Institute is a primary sponsor of the International Conference on Water Resources and Arid Environments which has been held biennially in Riyadh, Saudi Arabia since 2004.

The Institute also serves as headquarters for the General Secretariat of the Prince Sultan Bin Abdulaziz International Prize for Water.

== Fields of Research Interest ==
Within the context of the arid environments of the Arabian peninsula, the Institute is interested in pursuing research in the following areas:

- Desert environment systems
- Aridity, and aridity control measures
- Environmental pollution
- Environmental awareness and education
- Environmental impact of projects
- Climate change and early warning of climatic disasters
- Maintaining environmental balance
- Ecotourism
- Land deterioration, desertification, and sand dune stabilization
- Natural resources of the desert and their development and protection
- Forests and afforestation
- Rangeland management and maintenance
- Forage crops in both arid and desert environment
- Adaptation of imported plants and animals under desert conditions
- Identification and evaluation of indigenous plants
- Deriving benefit from desert fauna, camels in particular
- Genetic modification of indigenous flora and fauna, and protection of native genomes
- Preservation of wildlife and biodiversity
- Arid land regions
- Reclamation and cultivation of desert lands
- Traditional agriculture and sustainable development in Saudi Arabia
- Care and development of date palms
- Water resources, methods of exploring water supplies to avoid scarcity, and the development of relevant technologies.
- Irrigation systems
- Administration of water resources, particularly rainwater harvesting and storage
- Water policy for achieving water security
- Water reservation; economical ways of using water for agricultural purposes
- Desalination
- Economies of utilizing saline water and sea water in agriculture
- Utilization of new technologies in research, especially remote sensing and geographic information systems
- Solar energy; its utilization in agriculture and desert development
- Economic studies relating to patterns of exploitation and agricultural production in the desert.

== See also ==
- List of environmental organizations
