= Linda Abriola =

American environmental/civil engineer

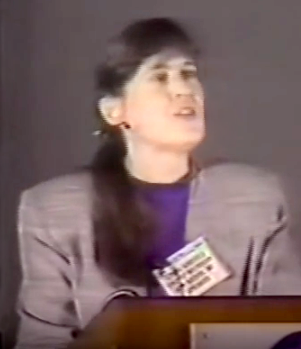
- Abriola at the 1996 Henry Darcy Lecture Series
- Born: 1954 (age 71–72); Pennsylvania, US
- Education: Drexel University; Princeton University
- Known for: Environmental engineering
- Scientific career
- Fields: Environmental engineering Civil engineering
- Workplaces: University of Michigan; Tufts University; Brown University

Linda Marie Abriola is an American environmental and civil engineer who specializes in the study of organic chemical liquid contaminants in porous media. She is currently the Joan Wernig and E. Paul Sorensen Professor of Engineering at the Brown University School of Engineering.

== Academic history and positions ==
Abriola attended Drexel University, graduating with a B.S. in civil engineering in 1976. She continued her education at Princeton University, where she earned her Ph.D. in civil engineering in 1983.

From 1984 to 2003 she served on the faculty of the Department of Civil and Environmental Engineering at the University of Michigan. There she directed the Environmental and Water Resources Engineering Program from 1996 to 2001.

In 2003 she left the University of Michigan to become dean of the School of Engineering at Tufts University, and holds a position as professor of civil and environmental engineering, and adjunct professor in chemical and biological engineering. She also directs the Integrated Multiphase Environmental Systems Laboratory at Tufts.

She was named university professor at Tufts in 2015, a prestigious title awarded in recognition of the contributions she has made to her field as well as her commitment to the university's community.

In 2016, she was selected as a U.S. Science Envoy by the United States State Department.

== Research ==
Abriola's research has focused on describing the behavior of organic chemical liquid contaminants in porous media, through the combination of laboratory experimentation and mathematical models. She was one of the first to create a mathematical model of the interphase mass partitioning and non-aqueous phase migration of organic liquid contaminants in the subsurface flow. She is particularly known for the research she has done on the characterization and remediation of chlorinated solvent-contaminated aquifers.

Recently, she has used a combination of models and lab experimentation to examine the influence of abiotic and biotic processes on the persistence of organics and on the effectiveness of aquifer remediation technologies.

Abriola is the author of more than 120 refereed publications, and is an ISI Highly Cited Researcher in Ecology/Environment.

== Selected honors and awards ==
- 2022 Groundwater Prize of the 10th Prince Sultan bin Abdulaziz International Prize for Water
- 2022 class of Fellows of the American Association for the Advancement of Science (AAAS)
- 2013 Engineering Leader of the Year Award, Drexel University
- 2012 Strategic Environmental Research and Development Program (SERDP) Environmental Restoration Project of the Year Award
- 2011 The Power List, CE News
- 2011 Annual Distinguished Ryckman Lecture, McKelvey School of Engineering at Washington University in St. Louis 2010 Listed in encyclopedia American Women of Science since 1900
- 2010 Charles & Mary O'Melia Lecture in Environmental Sciences, Johns Hopkins University
- 2008 CESEP Distinguished Lecture, Colorado School of Mines
- 2006 SERDP Environmental Restoration Project of the Year Award
- 2006 Elected to the American Academy of Arts and Sciences
- 2006 Lichtenstein Distinguished Lecture, Ohio State University College of Engineering
- 2004 Distinguished Lecturer for Georgia Institute of Technology Lecture Series
- 2003 Elected to the National Academy of Engineering
- 2002 ISI Highly Cited Research in Ecology/Environment
- 2001-03 Horace Williams King Collegiate Professorship (University of Michigan College of Engineering)
- 2000 Elected Fellow of the American Geophysical Union
- 1998 College of Engineering Teaching Excellence Award, The University of Michigan
- 1996 Outstanding Educator Award, Association for Women Geoscientists
- 1996 Distinguished Darcy Lecturer, National Ground Water Association
- 1994 College of Engineering Research Excellence Award, The University of Michigan
- 1991 Republic Bank Corp. Centennial Professorship in Petroleum Engineering (The University of Texas at Austin)
- 1988 Recipient, Class of 1938E Distinguished Service Award to Outstanding Members of the Engineering Faculty, The University of Michigan
- 1985 Recipient, National Science Foundation Presidential Young Investigator Award

== Family ==
Abriola is the daughter of Joseph and Gloria Christian Abriola. She is married to Lawrence Albert, and has three children.
