= Gowher Rizvi =

Bangladeshi historian, scholar, and academic

- গওহর রিজভী
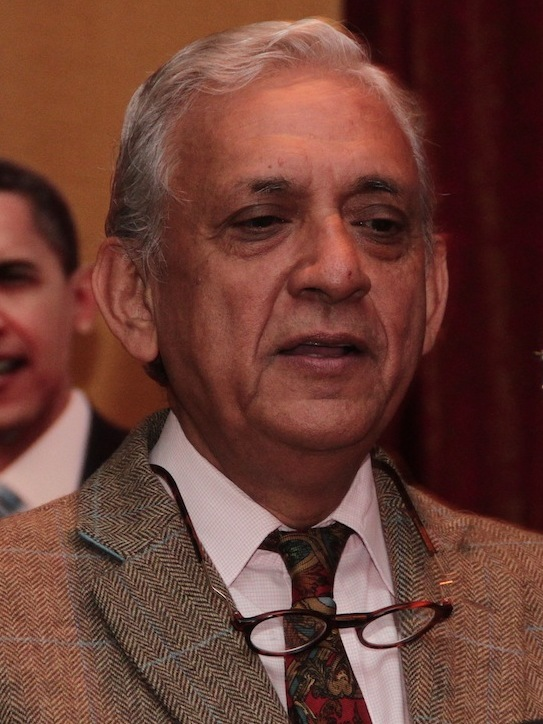

International Affairs Advisor to the Prime Minister of Bangladesh
- In office 11 January 2024 – 5 August 2024
- Prime Minister: Sheikh Hasina
- Preceded by: Himself
- Succeeded by: TBA
- In office 25 January 2009 – 29 November 2023
- Prime Minister: Sheikh Hasina
- Preceded by: office established
- Succeeded by: Himself

Personal details
- Born: April 28, 1948 (age 78) Chittagong, East Bengal, Dominion of Pakistan
- Spouse: Agnese Barolo
- Education: Faujdarhat Cadet College; University of Dhaka; University of Oxford
- Website: www.gowherrizvi.org

Gowher Rizvi is a Bangladeshi historian, scholar and academic. He is a former international affairs adviser to the former prime minister Sheikh Hasina of Bangladesh. Prior to that he was a MacArthur Fellow in international relations at Nuffield College, Oxford University. He was an editor of Contemporary South Asia and a Fellow of the Royal Historical Society. He held various appointments at Oxford University, the University of Warwick, the University of Canterbury, Harvard Kennedy School and the University of Virginia. His publications cover the disciplines of history, international relations, and public policy.

== Early life ==
Rizvi's ancestors moved from Murshidabad to East Bengal during the Partition of India. Rizvi spent the early part of his student life in Faujdarhat Cadet College. He passed both BA and MA in the first class from the University of Dhaka. In 1972, he went to Trinity College, Oxford as the second Rhodes scholar from Bangladesh (the first being his senior fellow at Faujdarhat) and garnered a D.Phil. in history.

Rizvi is married to Agnese Barolo. They have one daughter, Maya Barolo Rizvi, a 2008 graduate of Vassar.

== Career ==
Rizvi was at St. Antony's College, Oxford as the Alfred Beit Junior Lecturer and senior associate member from 1976 to 1978. From 1979 to 1981 he taught history at Balliol College, Oxford. He was MacArthur Scholar and Fellow in Politics and International Relations at Nuffield College, Oxford from 1988 to 1994. In 1992, he collaborated with the Royal Institute of International Affairs to organize a high-level Anglo-Iranian Roundtable in order to facilitate direct dialogue between senior officials of the two countries. In the same year he taught as Arnold Bernhard Visiting Professor of History at Williams College, Massachusetts. From 1994 to 1995 Professor Rizvi served as the director of contemporary affairs at the Asia Society in New York. In 1995 he joined the Ford Foundation, where he headed their operations in South Asia. In 1998 to 2002 he was appointed the Ford Foundation Representative to New Delhi with responsibilities for directing the foundation's activities in South Asia. From 2002 to 2008 he was a lecturer of Public Policy at Harvard Kennedy School. He was also director of the Ash Center for Democratic Governance and Innovation. In 2008 he was appointed vice provost for international programs at the University of Virginia. In 2009 he has become the International Affairs adviser to Sheikh Hasina Prime Minister of Bangladesh. Despite mounting international allegations of corruption, election irregularities, torture, and human-rights abuses against former Prime Minister Sheikh Hasina and her government, Rizvi, during his tenure as an advisor, persistently justified and defended the administration’s actions in various global forums. . That regime was ultimately toppled in 2024 by the July Revolution a- nationwide uprising.

Since her departure, the former PM has been indicted on numerous charges of serious crimes and human-rights violations, including murder, mass killings, and enforced disappearances—in contrast to Rizvi’s prior public claims.

== Selected publications ==
- —— (1978). Linlithgow and India: A Study of British Policy and the Political Impasse in India, 1936-43. Royal Historical Society. ISBN 978-0-901050-49-6.
- Copley, A.; Rizvi, Gowher, eds. (1984). Indo-British Relations in Retrospect. Madras: Indo-British Historical Society. OCLC 863485375.
- Holland, R. F.; Rizvi, Gowher, eds. (1984). Perspectives on Imperialism and Decolonization: Essays in Honour of A.F. Madden. London: Frank Cass. ISBN 978-1-138-97828-7.
- Allen, N. J.; Gombrich, R. F.; Raychaudhuri, T.; Rizvi, Gowher, eds. (1986). Oxford University papers on India. Oxford University Press. OCLC 1006160231.
- Buzan, B.; Rizvi, Gowher (1986). South Asian Insecurity and the Great Powers. London: Macmillan. ISBN 978-1-349-07941-4.
- —— (1985). Bangladesh: The Struggle for the Restoration of Democracy. London: Bangabandhu Society. OCLC 16710531.
- —— (1993). South Asia in a Changing International Order. New Delhi: SAGE. ISBN 978-81-7036-326-2.
- —— (2008). Democracy & Development: Restoring Social Justice at the Core of Good Governance. Colombo: International Center for Ethnic Studies. OCLC 1124279486.
- de Jong, J.; Rizvi, Gowher, eds. (2008). The State of Access. Success and Failure of Democracies to Create Equal Opportunities. Washington DC: Brookings Institution Press. ISBN 978-0-8157-0176-7.
