= Western Institute of Nanoelectronics =

Research institute in Los Angeles

Coordinates: 34.0687°N 118.4444°W

The Western Institute of Nanoelectronics (WIN) is a research institute founded in 2006 and headquartered at the UCLA Henry Samueli School of Engineering and Applied Science in Los Angeles, California, US. The WIN Center networks multiple universities with the Industry and government based sponsors (members of the Semiconductor Industry Association consortium NRI) and the National Institute of Standards and Technology (NIST) in pursuit of replacing Complementary Metal-Oxide Semiconductor Field-Effect Transistors (CMOS FET). WIN's research is focused on spintronics extending from materials, devices, and device interactions, metrology and circuits/architectures. Sponsors include:

- Nanoelectronics Research Initiative (NRI)
- UC Discovery
- NIST
- Intel Corporation

WIN is one of four research centers within the Nanoelectronics Research Initiative (NRI). Dr. Kang L. Wang serves as director. Current WIN university participants include four University of California campuses (Los Angeles, Berkeley, Santa Barbara and Irvine) and Stanford University, Denver University, Portland State University, and University of Iowa. NRI is a research initiative of the Nanoelectronics Research Corporation (NERC). NERC in turn is a subsidiary of the Semiconductor Research Corporation.
