= Zbigniew Kundzewicz =

Polish hydrologist, climatologist

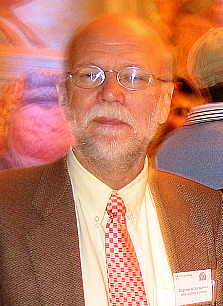
- Born: Zbigniew Kundzewicz; December 4, 1950; Augustów, Poland
- Education: Warsaw University of Technology
- Occupation: climatologist

Zbigniew Władysław Kundzewicz (born 4 December 1950 in Augustów, Poland) – is a Polish hydrologist and climatologist, a professor of Earth Sciences, and a corresponding member of the Polish Academy of Sciences and of Academia Europaea.

== Education and employment ==
Zbigniew Kundzewicz earned his undergraduate degree from the Department of Electronics at the Warsaw University of Technology. He earned his doctorate (PhD) in 1979, followed by his higher doctorate (DSc) in 1985, both in the physical sciences with a specialization in geophysics and hydrology. Since 1993 he has held the rank of professor of Earth sciences. Since 2010 he has been a corresponding member of the Polish Academy of Sciences (PAS), and since 2017 a member of Academia Europaea.

From 1974 to 1989 he worked at the PAS Institute of Geophysics. Since 1990 he has worked at the PAS Institute for the Agricultural and Forest Environment in Poznań. He has additionally been a research staff member at the Potsdam Institute for Climate Impact Research (2001-2016), one of the world’s top climate change research centers.

== Research ==
Kundzewicz’s research interests include hydrological extremes (especially floods), the climate and water (especially the impact of climate change on water resources), and the consequences of climate change on sectors and systems. He has served as an expert in these fields, in various capacities. He served as the chairman of the PAS Committee on Threat Research, and also the PAS Committee on Water Threat Research. Since 1994 he has been one of the experts of the Intergovernmental Panel on Climate Change (IPCC), including as a four-fold Co-ordinating Lead Author.

He has published extensively as a scientist, with more than 550 scientific publications authored or co-authored by him. From April 1997 to April 2015 he served as editor-in-chief of Hydrological Sciences Journal.

== Awards and distinctions ==
Kundzewicz has received various decorations and awards for his research work. He obtained an honorary doctorate from the Warsaw University of Life Sciences (SGGW) in 2018 and also an honorary professorship from the Nanking University of Information Science and Technology (NUIST) in 2018. He has received the Prince Sultan bin Abdulaziz International Prize for Water (2020), the International Hydrological Prize (Dooge Medal) (2017), the Grand Golden Seal Award of the City of Poznań (2008), the Tison Award of the International Association of Hydrological Sciences (1987) and the Award of the Secretary General of the Polish Academy of Sciences (1986). He contributed to the work of the Intergovernmental Panel on Climate Change (IPCC), which in 2007 earned a collective Nobel Peace Prize. In Poland, Prof. Kundzewicz has been decorated with a Knight’s Cross of the Polonia Restituta Order and a Golden Cross of Merit.

== Publications ==
- Kundzewicz, Z.W., Rosbjerg, D., Simonovic, S.P. & Takeuchi, K. (ed.), Extreme Hydrological Events: Precipitation, Floods and Droughts. IAHS Publ. No. 213, IAHS Press, Wallingford, U. K., pp. 459 + ix., 1993.
- Kundzewicz, Z.W. (ed.), New Uncertainty Concepts in Hydrology and Water Resources, Cambridge University Press, Cambridge, U.K., 322 pp., 1995.
