= Water diplomacy =

Political tool

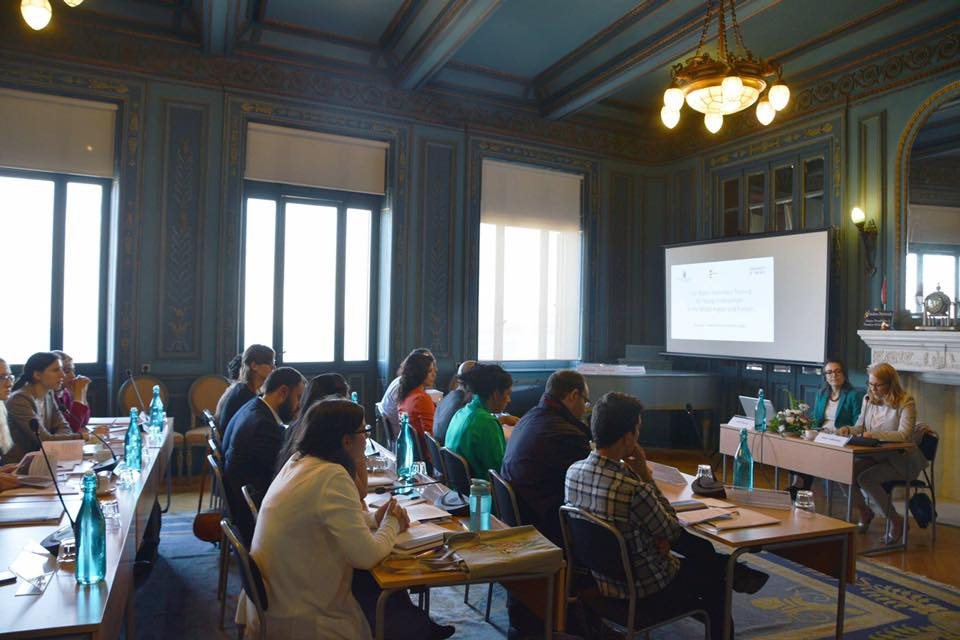
Participants at water diplomacy training in Swedish Institute Alexandria

Water diplomacy focuses on establishing novel solutions founded on a scientific basis and sensitive to societal constraints to a wide range of water problems. Tools of water diplomats include environmental policy, water management strategy, and engineering solutions and are applied within the context of the individual water problem at the appropriate scale.

== Emerging Approaches to Water Diplomacy ==
Water problems involve stakeholders such as agriculture and industry, urban developers and environmental conservationists competing for the limited and common resource of available water. These problems also cross physical, disciplinary, and jurisdictional boundaries. Because of these competing needs and objectives, it is difficult to find acceptable solutions to water problems. Recognizing that women are disproportionally affected by water supply and quality issues, there is increasing attention worldwide to including women in water diplomacy. Training and capacity building programs for water professionals in developing regions are intended to develop skills to help resolve unaligned interests.

The “Water 2100” approach, differing from other tools used in water politics and traditional diplomacy, is to examine problems as an interconnected grouping of natural and societal domains in which competition and feedbacks occur between variables. The natural constraints of quantity, quality, and ecosystem needs interact with societal domain variables including social values/norms, economy, and governance. This “Water 2100” approach seeks to synthesize scientific and contextual water knowledge into actionable solutions through formulating/framing water problems as questions that can be used to negotiate solutions appropriate to the context and stakeholders for each water dispute.

== Organizations and initiatives ==
- Strategic Foresight Group
- INWRDAM
- Arab Water Academy
- Tufts University Water Diplomacy PhD Program
- World Water Council
- AquaPedia
- IHE Delft Institute for Water Education
- Stockholm International Water Institute
- Women in Water Diplomacy Network

== See also ==
- Environmental Policy
- Water conflict
- Water politics
