= Thomas W. Kenny =

American engineer

Thomas William Kenny Jr. (Note: Name stated in patents, e.g. in "Apparatus for Conditioning Power and Managing Thermal Energy in an Electronic Device".) is an American entrepreneur and mechanical engineer at Stanford University, where he holds the Richard W. Weiland Professorship in the School of Engineering. Along with Ken Goodson and Juan Santiago, Kenny was a co-founder of Cooligy, which was acquired by Emerson Network Power in 2005.

Kenny received a Bachelor of Science degree in physics from the University of Minnesota in 1983, as well as Master of Science and Doctor of Philosophy degrees in physics from the University of California, Berkeley in 1989 and 1993, respectively. He worked for the Jet Propulsion Laboratory from 1989 to 1993, where his research included the "development of electron-tunneling high-resolution microsensors." He moved to the mechanical engineering department at Stanford University in 1994, where he continues to study sensors and micromechanics. Kenny works with professors Goodson and Santiago within the department; in 2001, the trio founded an electronics cooling company named Cooligy, which was acquired by Emerson in 2005.

At Stanford, Kenny serves as Richard W. Weiland Professor, and was formerly Paul Davies Family University Fellow in Undergraduate Education. He is the professor of the eponymous Kenny Group, which studies microstructures and sensors. Kenny's awards and honors include: the CAREER Award (NSF, 1995–1999), the Technical Achievement Award (IEEE, 2011), fellowship in the American Society of Mechanical Engineers (2014), the Daniel Noble Award for Emerging Technologies (IEEE, 2019), and election to the National Academy of Engineering (2022). In 2024, Kenny gave the Yunchuan Aisinjioro-Soo Distinguished Lecture at the National Center for Supercomputing Applications.
