= Amy Marconnet =

American mechanical engineer

Amy Marie Marconnet is an American mechanical engineer and an expert in heat transfer, especially for nanoscale materials. She is a professor of mechanical engineering at Purdue University. Her research has included the development of graphene-based tunable thermal climate control systems for batteries and electronics, and the effects of heat in straightening hair.

== Education and career ==
Marconnet studied mechanical engineering as an undergraduate at the University of Wisconsin–Madison, graduating in 2007. She went to Stanford University for graduate study in mechanical engineering, earned a master's degree in 2009, and completed her Ph.D. in 2012. Her doctoral dissertation, Thermal phenomena in nanostructured materials & devices, was supervised by Kenneth E. Goodson.

After postdoctoral research at the Massachusetts Institute of Technology, she joined the Purdue University faculty in 2013. She was promoted to full professor in Purdue's School of Mechanical Engineering 2024. At Purdue, she is also a Perry Academic Excellence Scholar and holds a courtesy appointment in the School of Materials Engineering.

== Recognition ==
In 2017, the American Society of Mechanical Engineers (ASME) Electronics and Photonics Packaging Division named Marconnet as their Woman Engineer of the Year. In 2020 she received the Bergles-Rohsenow Young Investigator Award in Heat Transfer of the ASME Heat Transfer Division, "for the development of a creative, interdisciplinary approach to evaluate, understand and control the physical mechanisms governing the thermal transport properties of materials, machines and systems". She was elected as an ASME Fellow in 2022.
