= AquaPedia =

AquaPedia is free, web-based, collaborative self-learning repository of interactive and searchable water case studies from across the planet for information and analysis of water conflicts. It was developed at Tufts University in 2008.

AquaPedia has the goal of sharing water conflict case studies that integrate information from the science/engineering aspects with understanding of the societal/cultural issues that are also integral to the framing and solution of the problem

AquaPedia is currently in a beta testing phase with contributions from academics. Case studies are categorized within the framework of 6 variables from two domains (natural/societal). The natural domain contributes: water quantity, quality, and ecosystem constraints. The societal domain contributes the interactions between values and norms, economic considerations, and governance structures

Like traditional wiki-style sites, anyone can contribute water case studies or potential revisions; however, AquaPedia editors review these submissions prior to being added to the website to ensure accuracy
