= Ignacio Rodríguez Iturbe =

Venezuelan hydrologist (1942–2022)

Ignacio Rodríguez Iturbe (8 March 1942 – 28 September 2022) was a Venezuelan hydrologist who was a professor at Texas A&M University.

== Biography ==
Rodríguez Iturbe was born in Maracaibo, Zulia State in 1942. He graduated from the University of Zulia as a civil engineer and did graduate studies at Caltech, earning his PhD at Colorado State University in 1967.

Rodríguez Iturbe taught at many universities, including the University of Zulia, MIT, Texas A&M, Princeton University and the University of Iowa. He also taught for 20 years at Simon Bolivar University.

Rodríguez Iturbe was a member of the US National Committee for the International Institute for Applied Systems Analysis from 2004. In 2008, he received a special recognition from the World Cultural Council.

Rodríguez Iturbe died on 28 September 2022, at the age of 80.

== Honors ==
- 1988 - Elected a member of the National Academy of Engineering in 1988 for innovations in the analysis, synthesis, and sampling of hydrologic signals, and for inspirational leadership in hydrologic research and education.
- 1998 - Awarded the Robert E. Horton Medal
- 2002 - Awarded the Stockholm Water Prize for his role in developing the science of hydrology
- 2009 - Awarded the William Bowie Medal.
- 2010 - Awarded the Creativity Prize of the Prince Sultan bin Abdulaziz International Prize for Water, along with Andrea Rinaldo, for developing the field of Ecohydrology.
- 2010 - Elected a member of the United States National Academy of Sciences.
- 2010 - Appointed by Pope Benedict XVI to the Pontifical Academy of Sciences
