= Kenneth E. Goodson =

American engineer and academic (born 1967)

- Born: Kenneth Eugene Goodson; August 1, 1967; Lafayette, Indiana
- Occupation: Professor
- Spouse: Laura Dahl

Academic background
- Education: Massachusetts Institute of Technology (BS, BS, MS, PhD)
- Thesis: Thermal conduction in microelectronic circuits (1993)

Academic work
- Discipline: Engineering
- Sub-discipline: Heat transfer; Electronics cooling; Energy conversion
- Institutions: School of Engineering, Stanford University
- Doctoral students: Amy Marconnet, Eric Pop

Kenneth Eugene Goodson (born August 1, 1967) is an American mechanical engineer and academic at Stanford University. He serves as Davies Family Provostial Professor within the university, as well as Senior Associate Dean for Faculty and Academic Affairs within its School of Engineering.

== Early life ==
According to Who's Who in the World, Goodson was born in Lafayette, Indiana on August 1, 1967.

== Education ==
Goodson has received four academic degrees from the Massachusetts Institute of Technology (MIT): two Bachelors of Science in 1989 (one in mechanical engineering and another in music), a Master of Science in 1991 (in mechanical engineering), and a Doctor of Philosophy in 1993 (also in mechanical engineering).

== Career ==
From 1993 to 1994, he worked for Daimler-Benz AG in Germany as a visiting materials scientist. He has been employed at Stanford since 1994 as a professor in the mechanical engineering department. By courtesy, he also holds a professorship in the materials science & engineering department. (Note: Both departments fall under the Stanford University School of Engineering.) Starting in 2008, he was the vice chair of mechanical engineering, and from 2013 to 2019, he held the Robert Bosch Chairman position in the department. Additionally, since 2014, he has held the Davies Family Professorship.

He is the principal investigator of the Stanford NanoHeat Lab, and is also an affiliated faculty member of Stanford Bio-X.

Goodson is a fellow of the American Association for the Advancement of Science, American Society of Mechanical Engineers, Institute of Electrical and Electronics Engineers, American Physical Society, and National Academy of Inventors. He is also an elected member of the National Academy of Engineering (class of 2020).

=== Recognition ===
Goodson appears in the 35th through 38th editions of American Men and Women of Science. (Note: Gale CX3664354638, CX3677159918, CX7734062640, CX8010164519.)

== Personal life ==
Goodson moonlights as a baritone soloist in oratorio, and has held voice fellowships from the Tanglewood Music Festival and a Sudler Prize for Arts Achievement (conferred by MIT in 1989). He also posts about woodworking and cycling to his Instagram and Strava accounts, respectively. His wife, Laura Dahl, is a pianist who plays with the Stanford music faculty.

Goodson has also been noted as a cellist.
