= Prince Sultan bin Abdulaziz International Prize for Water =

Saudi Arabian scientific prize

The Prince Sultan bin Abdulaziz International Prize for Water (PSIPW)
- Awarded for: Outstanding scientific contributions related to surface water, ground water, alternative (non-traditional) water resources, and water conservation. The Prize also awards a Creativity Prize to an innovative work in any water-related field.
- Country: Saudi Arabia
- Presented by: The PSIPW Prize Council
- First award: 2004
- Website: Official website

The Prince Sultan bin Abdulaziz International Prize for Water (PSIPW) is a Saudi Arabian scientific prize, established on 21 October 2002 by Prince Sultan Bin Abdulaziz Al Saud. The Prize has its headquarters at the Prince Sultan Research Center for Environment, Water and Desert (PSRCEWD) at King Saud University.

It is a bi-annual international scientific award that accepts nominations from all over the world. For its third round (2006–2008), the Prize received 198 nominations from 53 countries, with the Creativity Prize, worth more than a quarter of a million dollars, receiving 73 of those nominations.

== Prizes Awarded ==
PSIPW offers five distinct prizes. One million Saudi Riyals (about $266,000) is allocated for the Creativity Prize, while half a million Saudi Riyals (about $133,000) is allocated for each of the other four Specialized Prizes. The Prize is accompanied by a gold medallion, a trophy and a certificate.

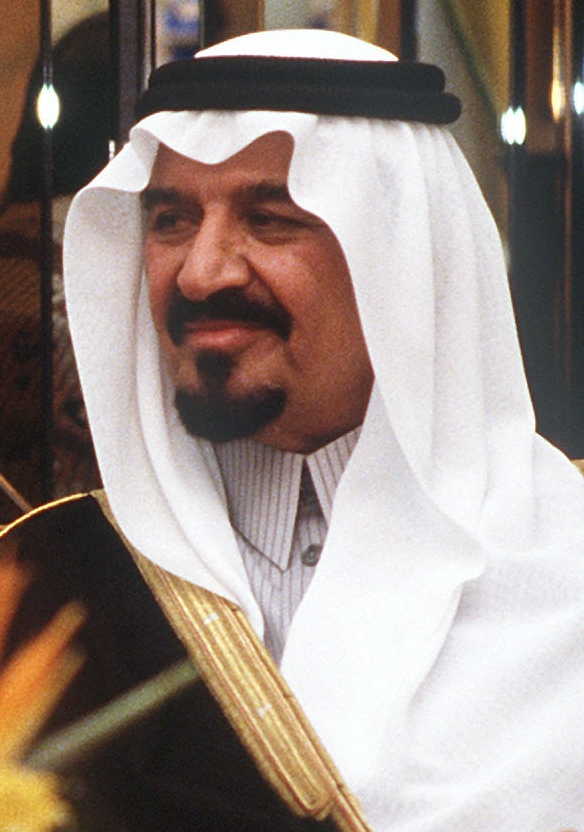
Prince Sultan Bin Abdulaziz Al Saud

The five prizes are as follows:

- Creativity Prize

Specialized Prizes:

- Surface Water Prize
- Groundwater Prize
- Alternative Water Resources Prize
- Water Management and Protection Prize

During the first two awards of the Prize (2002–2004) and (2004–2006) there were five specialized prizes, since "Water Resources Management" and "Water Resources Protection" were awarded separately. These two prizes were combined after the Second Award and the "Water Management and Protection Prize" was awarded for the first time with the Third Award (2006–2008). The Creativity Prize was inaugurated for the Third Award (2006–2008).

=== The Creativity Prize ===
The Creativity Prize is not restricted to specific topics. Instead, its criteria are defined by general guidelines. This allows the Creativity Prize to cover a broad range of interdisciplinary water-related subjects.

The Creativity Prize is awarded to work that the Prize Committee deems to be a "breakthrough" in any water-related field. The work might be an invention, a research paper, a new technology, or a development project. It can relate to any branch of any water-related discipline. It might contribute to increasing available water resources, or to alleviating scarcity, or to minimizing pollution. It might make a material contribution to water conservation or to effective water management. The work should provide a solution which is useful to society, contribute to development and social upliftment, be practical, environmentally friendly, and cost-effective.

=== Specialized Prizes ===
The topic for each of the four specialized prizes used to vary with each award. For example, in one round of the Prize, the Surface Water topic might be "Flood Control". In other rounds, the topic might be "Rainwater Harvesting", "Sedimentation Control", "Space Technology Applications" or some other topic related to surface water issues. The same applied to the other three specialized prizes. However, the topic for the third specialized branch – alternative (non-traditional) water resources – will most frequently be related to desalination.

The topics for the (4th) award were as follows:

- 1st Branch (Surface Water) topic: Innovative Methods for Rain and Runoff Water Modeling
- 2nd Branch (Ground Water) topic: Assessment and Control of Radioactive Contamination in Groundwater
- 3rd Branch (Alternative -non-traditional- Water Resources) topic: Innovative Methods for Water Production from Non-Traditional Water Resources
- 4th Branch (Water Resources Management and Protection) topic: Remote Sensing and GIS Applications for Water Resources Management

Starting with the 5th award (2012), specific topics were no longer announced. All of the Specialized Prizes became open to all relevant topics.

== Organization, nomination and selection ==
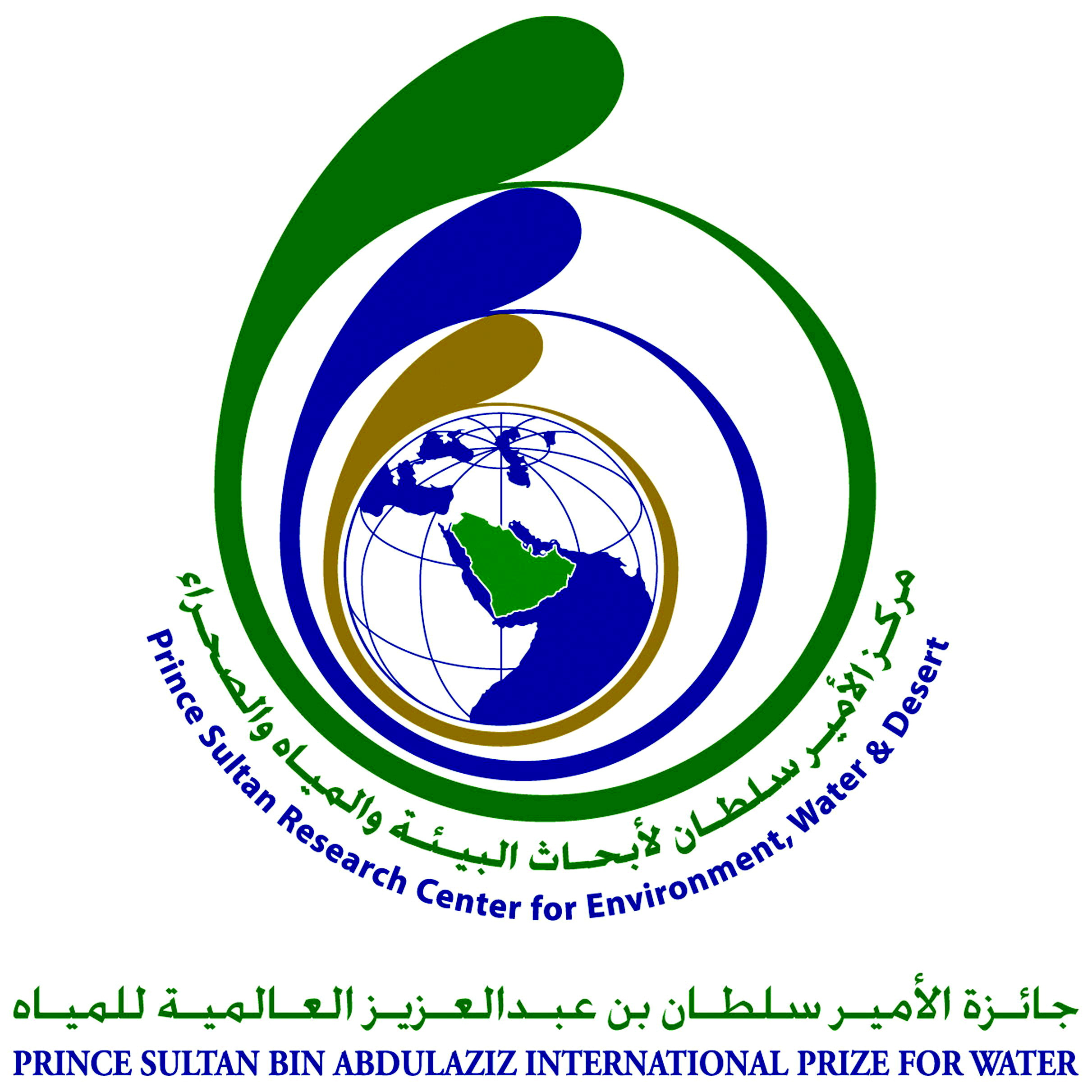
PSIPW logo

The Prize Council consists of the Prize Council Chairman who is presently HRH Prince Khalid Bin Sultan Bin Abdulaziz and the following council members:

- The Saudi Minister of Water and Electricity
- The Rector of King Saud University
- The Governor of the Saline Water Conversion Corporation
- The General Secretary of the Prize, who is also the Director of Prince Sultan Research Center for Environment, Water and Desert:- King Saud University
- 3 Saudi experts
- 3 international experts

=== Conditions for nomination – Creativity Prize ===
1. All nominations for the 4th Award of the Prize will be made online through an electronic application form that will be available on the PSIPW website. All required documentation and submitted works will be uploaded by way of the same form. No mail-in applications will be accepted.
2. Nominations may be made for individuals and groups whose work conforms to the criteria of the Creativity Prize (see above).
3. An individual or group of individuals (a team working on the same project or research) may be nominated for the prize. In the event that a group of individuals are being nominated, all group members must be named at the time of application and one member must be specified as their representative. Groups of people working on the same project may not be nominated separately. They must be nominated as a group with a single nomination form.
4. A university, institution, or government agency is not eligible to be nominated for the Creativity Prize. The nominee must be an individual or group of individuals.
5. Nominations for the Creativity Prize must be made by a university, institution, or government agency. Individuals may not nominate themselves or others for the Creativity Prize.
6. The work or works being considered for the nomination must have been completed no more than five (5) years prior to the nomination deadline for the current Prize.
7. Published research papers, published books, and registered patents may be submitted for consideration. No more than five (5) distinct works may be submitted. Multiple works should not be collected together and submitted as a single work.
8. Works will be reviewed and judged in English. If the work being nominated was originally published in a language other than English, it must be submitted in the original language accompanied by a full translation or by a translation of the parts of the work that are to be considered for the Prize. If a partial English translation is provided for a work submitted in another language, then only that portion of the work which is translated will be considered for assessment.
9. An individual or group nominated for the Creativity Prize may not be nominated in the same round for a Specialized Branch Prize.
10. The work being nominated must not have previously been a recipient of any other international prize.
11. Members of the Prize committees and their immediate relatives may not be nominated for the Prize.

=== Conditions for nomination – specialized branch prizes ===
1. All nominations for the 4th Award of the Prize will be made online through an electronic application form that will be available on the PSIPW website. All required documentation and submitted works will be uploaded by way of the same form. No mail-in applications will be accepted.
2. Nominations may be made for individuals, groups, and organizations who have made a pioneering contribution in of the branches of the Prize (see above).
3. An individual, group of individuals (a team working on the same project or research), or organization may nominate themselves for the prize. In the event that a group of individuals are being nominated, all group members must be named at the time of application and one member must be specified as their representative. Groups of people working on the same project may not be nominated separately. They must be nominated as a group with a single nomination form.
4. The work or works being considered for the nomination must have been completed no more than five (5) years prior to the nomination deadline for the current Prize.
5. Published research papers, published books, and registered patents may be submitted for consideration. No more than five (5) distinct works may be submitted. Multiple works should not be collected together and submitted as a single work. All works submitted for consideration must be related to the particular specialized branch chosen for the nomination.
6. Works will be reviewed and judged in English. If the work being nominated was originally published in a language other than English, it must be submitted in the original language accompanied by a full translation or by a translation of the parts of the work that are to be considered for the Prize. If a partial English translation is provided for a work submitted in another language, then only that portion of the work which is translated will be considered for assessment.
7. An individual, group, or organization nominated for a particular branch of the Prize may not be nominated in the same round for another Specialized Branch Prize or for the Creativity Prize.
8. The work being nominated must not have previously been a recipient of any other international prize.
9. Members of the Prize committees and their immediate relatives may not be nominated for the Prize.

=== Evaluation of nominated works ===
Works are evaluated to determine their scientific value and originality, how they contribute to the field, and their usefulness to society, especially with reference to development and to solving problems on an international level.

The nominated works are evaluated by an international panel of scientists who serve on various specialized committees on one or more of the following three levels:

- Preliminary Evaluation Committees
- Referee Committees
- Selection Committees

== Award ceremonies ==
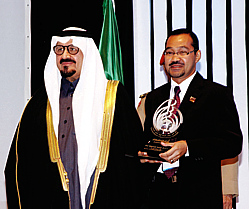
Professor Abdul Latif Ahmad receiving the Prize from Prince Sultan bin Abdulaziz at the 2006 awards ceremony

The secretariat of the Prize typically announces the names of the winners in October, with the Prizes being awarded at a formal ceremony held in November in conjunction with an academic conference.

The ceremony for the First Award was held on Sunday, 5 December 2004 at King Saud University along with the 1st International Conference on Water Resources and Arid Environments. The ceremony for the Second Award took place on 26 November 2006 concurrently with the 2nd International Conference on Water Resources and Arid Environments.

The ceremony for the Third Award took place on Sunday, 16 November 2008 in conjunction with the 3rd International Conference on Water Resources and Arid Environments 2008 and 1st Arab Water Forum, which ran from 16 to 19 November. The ceremony was attended by Prince Willem-Alexander, Crown Prince of the Netherlands, Prince of Orange and Chairman of the Advisory Commission of United Nations Secretary General for Water and Sanitation Affairs.

The 11th Awards Ceremony of the Prince Sultan Bin Abdulaziz International Prize for Water (PSIPW) was held under the Patronage of the Custodian of the Two Holy Mosques, King Salman Bin Abdulaziz Al Saud on 8 November at the United Nations Office in Vienna (UNOV), Vienna International Centre. The Ceremony was supported by the Permanent Mission of the Kingdom of Saudi Arabia to the United Nations in Vienna, the Permanent Mission of the Kingdom of Saudi Arabia to the United Nations in New York and the United Nations Office for Outer Space Affairs (UNOOSA), with the virtual participation of H.E. Mr. António Guterres, Secretary-General of the United Nations.

== Medals, trophies and certificates ==
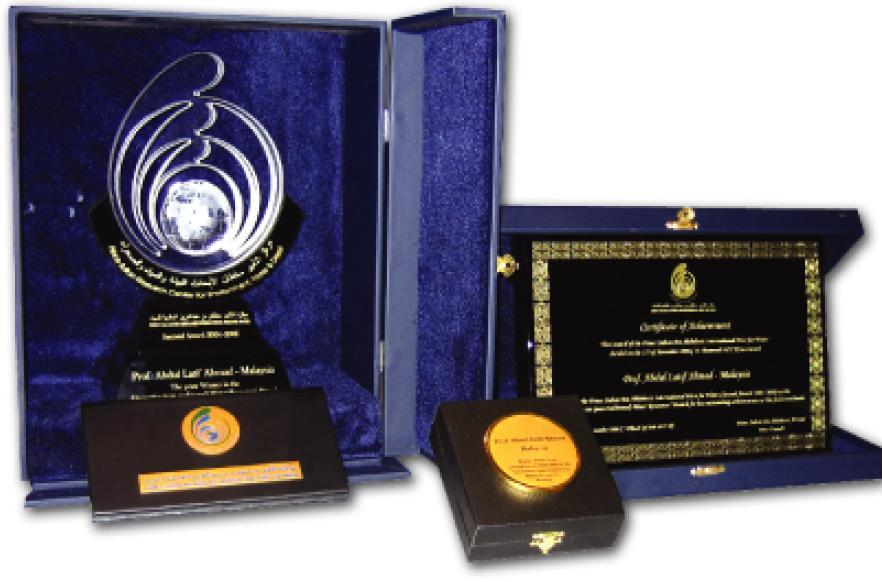
PSIPW trophy, medallion & certificate

The monetary award of the Prize is accompanied by a gold medallion, a trophy and a certificate.

The base of the trophy is engraved in both English and Arabic with the name of the Prize and the winner, while the top of the trophy is made of crystal in the pattern of the PSIPW logo – concentric, tear-shaped semicircles surrounding a central image of the Earth.

== Prize winners ==
=== First Award (2002–2004) ===
The Prize Council announced the names of the winners on 31 October 2004 as follows:

- 1st Branch – Surface Water – Topic: Effective Flood Control Methods
  - Dr. Jery R. Stedinger, USA
- 2nd Branch – Ground Water – Topic: Artificial Ground Water Recharge
  - Dr. Herman Bouwer, USA
- 3rd Branch – Alternative (Non-traditional) Water Resources – Topic: Economical Technologies in Sea Water Desalination
  - Dr. Hisham Taha Abdulla El Dossouky, Egypt
  - Dr. Hisham Ettouney, Egypt
- 4th Branch – Water Resources Management – Topic: Effective New Techniques for Irrigation Water Conservation
  - King Abdulaziz City for Science & Technology, Saudi Arabia.
- 5th Branch – Protection of Water Resources – Topic: Protecting Ground Water From Agricultural Pollutants – No award given due to the lack of nominations which met the required standards and conditions.

=== Second Award (2004–2006) ===
The Prize Council announced the names of the winners on 31 October 2007 as follows:

- 1st Branch – Surface Water – Topic: Water Harvesting – No award given due to the lack of nominations which met the required standards and conditions.
- 2nd Branch – Ground Water – Topic: Management of Coastal Aquifers
  - The Water Section- Research Institute- King Fahd University for Petroleum and Minerals, Saudi Arabia
  - Professor Abdelkader Larabi, Morocco
- 3rd Branch – Alternative (Non-traditional) Water Resources – Topic: Treatment and Re-use of Waste Water
  - Professor Abdul Latif Ahmad, Malaysia
- 4th Branch – Water Resources Management – Topic: Integrated and Sustainable Water Resources Management in Arid and Semi-Arid Regions
  - Professor Howard S. Wheater, United Kingdom
- 5th Branch – Protection of Water Resources – Topic: Ground Water Pollution by Urban Activities
  - King Abdulaziz City for Science & Technology, Saudi Arabia

=== Third Award (2006–2008) ===
The Prize Council announced the names of the winners as follows:

- 1st Branch – Surface Water – Topic: Sedimentation Control in Surface Water Systems
  - Dr. Chih Ted Yang, Borland Professor of Water Resources and Director of the Hydroscience and Training Center, Department of Civil Engineering, Colorado State University
- 2nd Branch – Ground Water – Topic: Exploration and Assessment of Ground Water
  - Dr. Wolfgang Kinzelbach, Professor of Hydromechanics, ETH Zurich (Swiss Federal Institute of Technology)
- 3rd Branch – Alternative (Non-traditional) Water Resources – Topic: Innovative Methods and Systems in Desalination
  - Dr. Abdul Wahab Mohammad, Deputy Dean and Professor (Membrane and Separations Technology), Universiti Kebangsaan Malaysia
  - Saline Water Conversion Corporation, Saudi Arabia
- 4th Branch – Water Resources Management & Protection – Topic: Water Demand Management in Urban Areas
  - Dr. Zainuddin Abd Manan, Professor of Chemical Engineering and the founder of Process Systems Engineering Centre (PROSPECT), Universiti Teknologi Malaysia
  - Decision Center for a Desert City, Arizona State University, Tempe, Arizona
- The Creativity Prize – The Selection Committee determined not to award the Creativity Prize during this round.

=== Fourth Award (2008–2010) ===
The Prize Council announced the names of the winners as follows:

- 3rd Branch – Alternative Water Resources
  - Bart Van der Bruggen, Katholieke Universiteit, Leuven, Belgium
- 4th Branch – Water Management and Protection
  - Dr. Soroosh Sorooshian, University of California, Irvine, USA
- Creativity Prize
  - Dr. Ignacio Rodriguez-Iturbe (Princeton University, USA) and Dr. Andrea Rinaldo (École Polytechnique Fédérale de Lausan, Switzerland); Dr. Marek Zreda (University of Arizona, USA) and Dr. Darin Desilets (Sandia National Laboratory, USA).

=== Fifth Award (2010–2012) ===
The Prize Council announced the names of the winners as follows:

- 1st Branch – Surface Water
  - Dr. Kevin E. Trenberth and Dr. Aiguo Dai, National Center for Atmospheric Research, USA
- 2nd Branch – Groundwater
  - Dr. Charles Franklin Harvey (Massachusetts Institute of Technology, USA) and Dr. Abu Borhan Mohammad Badruzzaman (Bangladesh University of Engineering and Technology, Dhaka)
- 3rd Branch – Alternative Water Resources
  - Dr. Mohamed Khayet Souhaimi, University Complutense of Madrid, Spain
- 4th Branch – Water Management and Protection
  - Dr. Damià Barceló, Catalan Institute for Water Research, Spain
- Creativity Prize
  - Dr. Ashok Gadgil, Dr. Susan Addy, and Case van Genuchten, (University of California, USA), Dr. Robert Kostecki (Lawrence Berkeley National Laboratory. USA), and Dr. Joyashree Roy (Jadavpur University, Kolkata, India).

=== Sixth Award (2012–2014) ===
The Prize Council announced the names of the winners as follows:

- 1st Branch – Surface Water
  - Dr. Larry Mays, Arizona State University, USA
- 2nd Branch – Groundwater
  - Dr. Jesús Carrera Ramirez, IDAEA, Barcelona, Spain
- 3rd Branch – Alternative Water Resources
  - Dr. Polycarpos Falaras, National Center for Scientific Research, Athens, Greece
- 4th Branch – Water Management and Protection
  - Dr. William W-G. Yeh, University of California, Los Angeles, USA
- Creativity Prize
  - Dr. Eric Wood and Justin Sheffield (Princeton University); Kristine M. Larson and Eric Small (University of Colorado), Valery Zavorotny (NOAA) and John Braun (UCAR), USA

=== Seventh Award (2014–2016) ===
The Prize Council announced the names of the winners as follows:

- 1st Branch – Surface Water
  - Dr. Gary Parker, University of Illinois, USA
- 2nd Branch – Groundwater
  - Dr. Tissa H. Illangasekare, Colorado School of Mines, USA
- 3rd Branch – Alternative Water Resources
  - Dr. Rong Wang and Dr. Anthony G. Fane Athens, Nanyang Technological University, Singapore
- 4th Branch – Water Management and Protection
  - Dr. Daniel P. Loucks Cornell University, USA
- Creativity Prize
  - Dr. Rita R. Colwell, University of Maryland and Dr. Shafiqul Islam, Tufts University, USA, Dr. Peter J. Webster, Georgia Institute of Technology, USA

=== Eighth Award (2016–2018) ===
The Prize Council announced the names of the winners as follows:

- 1st Branch – Surface Water
  - Dr. Wilfried Brutsaert, Cornell University, USA
- 2nd Branch – Groundwater
  - Dr. Martinus Theodorus van Genuchten, Federal University of Rio de Janeiro, Brazil
- 3rd Branch – Alternative Water Resources
  - Dr. Omar M. Yaghi, University of California, Berkeley and Dr. Evelyn Wang, MIT, USA
- 4th Branch – Water Management and Protection
  - Dr. Jim W. Hall and Dr. Edoardo Borgomeo, University of Oxford, UK
- Creativity Prize
  - Dr. Günter Blöschl, Vienna University of Technology and Dr. Murugesu Sivapalan, University of Illinois and Dr. Andre Geim and Dr. Rahul Nair, National Graphene Institute, University of Manchester, UK

=== Ninth Award (2018–2020) ===
The Prize Council announced the names of the winners as follows:

- 1st Branch – Surface Water
  - Dr. Zbigniew Kundzewicz, Polish Academy of Sciences, Poland
- 2nd Branch – Groundwater
  - Dr. J. Jaime Gómez-Hernández, Universitat Politècnica de València, Spain
- 3rd Branch – Alternative Water Resources
  - Dr. Peng Wang, King Abdullah University of Science and Technology, Thuwal, Saudi Arabia
- 4th Branch – Water Management and Protection
  - Dr. Jay R. Lund, University of California, Davis, USA
- Creativity Prize
  - Dr. Benjamin S. Hsiao and Dr. Priyanka Sharma, Stony Brook University, New York, USA; Dr. Sherif El-Safty, National Institute for Materials Science, Japan

=== Tenth Award (2020–2022) ===
The Prize Council announced the names of the winners as follows:

- 1st Branch – Surface Water
  - Dr. Dennis Baldocchi, University of California, Berkeley, USA
- 2nd Branch – Groundwater
  - Dr. Linda Abriola, Brown University, USA
- 3rd Branch – Alternative Water Resources
  - Dr. Menachem Elimelech, Yale University, USA
  - Dr. Chinedum Osuju, University of Pennsylvania, USA
- 4th Branch – Water Management and Protection
  - Dr. Matthew McCabe, Dr Rasmus Houborg, Dr Bruno Aragon, King Abdullah University of Science and Technology (KAUST), Thuwal, Saudi Arabia
- Creativity Prize
  - Dr. Thalappil Pradeep, Dr Avula Anil Kumar, Dr Chennu Sudhakar, Dr Sritama Mukherjee, Anshup, Dr Mohan Udhaya Sankar, Indian Institute of Technology, Madras, India

=== Eleventh Award (2022–2024) ===
The Prize Council announced the names of the winners as follows:

- 1st Branch – Surface Water
  - Dr. Qiuhua Liang, Dr Huili Chen, Dr Xiaodong Ming, Loughborough University, UK
  - Dr. Xilin Xia, University of Birmingham, UK
  - Dr. Yan Xiong, Jiangsu Open University, China
  - Dr. Jiaheng Zhao, FM Global, Singapore
- 2nd Branch – Groundwater
  - Dr. Chunmiao Zheng, Eastern Institute of Technology, Ningbo, China
  - Dr. Yingying Yao, Xi'an Jiaotong University, China
  - Dr. Erhu Du, Hohai University, Nanjing, China
- 3rd Branch – Alternative Water Resources
  - Dr. Virender K. Sharma, Dr Chetan Jinadatha, Texas A&M University, USA
  - Dr. Ching-Hua Huang, Georgia Institute of Technology, USA
  - Dr. Radek Zbořil, Palacký University Olomouc, Czech Republic
- 4th Branch – Water Management and Protection
  - Dr. Joseph Hun-wei Lee, Macau University of Science and Technology, China
- Creativity Prize
  - Dr. Paolo D’Odorico, University of California Berkeley, USA
  - Dr. Maria Cristina Rulli, Polytechnic University of Milan, Italy
  - Dr. Zhiguo He, Dr. Pengcheng Jiao, Dr. Yang Yang, Zhejiang University, China

== Other activities of the prize ==
The Prize is a nonprofit organization that, along with bestowing a biannual award, is involved in various water-related activities. These include the following:

1. The Prize, in conjunction with the United Nations and UNESCO, is undertaking to establish online an extensive international portal for water research, which will provide information about experts and organizations working in the field.
2. The General Secretariat of the Prize possesses an extensive library which includes, alongside books and journals in water-related fields, all of the research nominated to the Prize throughout its history. This research is made available for the benefit of specialist bodies engaged in research and applied water technologies in coordination with the original researchers.
3. The Prize sponsors the Prince Sultan Bin Abdulaziz International Prize's Chair for Water Research located at the Prince Sultan Research Center for Environment, Water, and Desert. The chair, in turn, supports research into rain and floodwater harvesting.
4. In conjunction with King Saud University and the Saudi Ministry of Water and Electricity, the Prize organizes a bi-annual international conference that is held concurrently with the Prize's awards ceremony. The 3rd Conference hosted workshops and seminars on the ministerial level.
5. The Prize, in conjunction with the United Nations, UNESCO, and the King Abdulaziz City for Science & Technology, participated in organizing the International Conference on the Use of Space Technology for Water Management held in Riyadh.
6. The Prize is one of the intergovernmental and non-governmental organizations having permanent observer status on the United Nations Committee on the Peaceful Uses of Outer Space (COPUOS), and as such, the Prize is part of the delegation representing Saudi Arabia at the COPUOS meetings of held annually in Vienna.
7. The Prize is a gold-level sponsor of a number of international conferences and exhibitions around the world, sponsoring at least 10 to 15 different conferences and exhibitions during each round of the Prize.
8. The Prize is a member of the Arab Water Council's Board of Governors, and as such actively participates in all of the council's meetings and conferences. It also provides support for some of the Arab Water Council's activities.

== See also ==
- List of environmental awards
- List of environmental organizations
