= Inter Services Selection Board (Bangladesh) =

Military candidate selection organization

- আন্তঃবাহিনী নির্বাচন পর্ষদ ইন্টার সার্ভিসেস সিলেকশন বোর্ড
- Abbreviation: ISSB
- Formation: 1976; 50 years ago
- Headquarters: Dhaka Cantonment, Dhaka
- Coordinates: 23.826782°N 90.407060°E
- Region served: Bangladesh
- Main organ: Ministry of Defence
- Parent organization: Bangladesh Armed Forces
- Website: issb-bd.org

The Inter Services Selection Board (colloquially known as ISSB) is a military organization for the selection of candidates in the Bangladesh Armed Forces: the army, the navy, and the air force.

== History ==
After the independence of Bangladesh, the need for the formation of a selection board was felt for the selection of officers of the armed forces. The army took the initiative first and accordingly the Army Selection Board was formed in 1974. Similarly, candidates for the Bangladesh Navy and Bangladesh Air Force were also selected by different boards from their respective service headquarters. Later, by merging all the selection boards, the Inter Services Selection Board (ISSB) was established in 1976. Since its inception, the main function of the ISSB has been to select candidates for the Bangladesh Armed Forces.
