= Meyer Rubin =

American geologist (1924–2020)

- Born: February 17, 1924; Chicago, Illinois, U.S.
- Died: May 2, 2020 (aged 96); Manassas, Virginia, U.S.
- Education: University of Chicago
- Awards: Washington Academy of Sciences Award, 1959; Department of the Interior Meritorious Service Award, 1974
- Scientific career
- Fields: Geology, geochemistry
- Workplaces: United States Geological Survey

Meyer Rubin (February 17, 1924 – May 2, 2020) was an American geologist known for his radiocarbon dating work with the United States Geological Survey.

== Early career ==
After graduating from Englewood High School, South Side, Chicago, in 1941, he attended the Woodrow Wilson Junior College, Chicago (now the Kennedy–King College). In the spring of 1943, Rubin enlisted into a University of Chicago run pre-meteorology training program (class "B") for the United States Army Air Forces (AAF); active duty effective March 3, 1943. Basic training was at Fort Sheridan with classes held at the University of Michigan. Rubin finished his training in September 1943, and was commissioned as a Second Lieutenant. He was shipped off first to Port Moresby, New Guinea, and then later to the Philippines, to help forecast weather for AAF long range flights in the Pacific Theater of World War II. After Japan surrendered, Rubin was sent to Tokyo as part of the post war occupation.

Rubin returned to the States in 1946 and attended, on the G.I. Bill, the University of Chicago, from which he earned his bachelor’s and master's degree, and later his Ph.D. in Geology (Prof. Leland Horberg, advisor).

Rubin joined the U.S. Geological Survey, Washington, D.C., on June 14, 1950, as a member of the Branch of Military Geology, then led by Frank C. Whitmore, Jr.

== Radiocarbon laboratory ==
In 1952, Hans E. Suess was hired by the U.S. Geological Survey (USGS) to set up a radiocarbon dating laboratory in Washington, D.C. and built the radiocarbon apparatus in a basement space in the GSA Building (former Department of the Interior Building) located at 1800 F St., NW. A basement space was needed due to the extreme mass of the two steel and lead shielded counter assemblies. In early 1953, Corrine Alexander joined the radiocarbon project, followed by Rubin in December of the same year. Routine radiocarbon ^{14}C measurements were begun in the summer of 1953.

Willard Libby, inventor of the ^{14}C dating method and 1960 Nobel Prize winner used a solid carbon method for sample determination, whereas Suess, upon seeing Libby's method in Chicago knew that he would try the gas, acetylene C_{2}H_{2}, as he had success with acetylene in the 1930s in Germany for other radiochemical determinations. This was a significant step as it allowed more efficient counting and easy movement of the counting material between the extraction apparatus, gas purification line and the two counters. Rubin initially assisted in the acetylene preparation, and as a geologist provided valuable input on the selection of samples and interpretation of results. In the first two years, the laboratory produced approximately 200 ^{14}C age determinations, which were critically important to unravel the various details of the most recent Pleistocene glaciation, the Wisconsin stage, among other geological problems.

Rubin became director of the USGS Radiocarbon Laboratory in 1955 when Suess left to set up a new laboratory at Scripps Institute of Oceanography, La Jolla, CA.

The next few years at the USGS were devoted to perfecting the acetylene technique and applying it to a multitude of geological and archaeological research. Rubin continued his research on the Wisconsin glacial stage and used the results for his doctoral dissertation, earning his Ph.D. from the University of Chicago in 1956.

In 1973, Rubin and the laboratory moved into a newly built USGS national headquarters in Reston, Virginia.

Rubin kept a room full of samples in the lab as part of the "tour," which included samples he said were wood relics from King Solomon's mines and the Queen of Sheba's palace, linen wraps from the Dead Sea Scrolls, and a large piece of whale baleen. He also kept a guest book he would ask visitors to sign.

== History of work ==
In April 1955, Rubin and Suess published the second set of ^{14}C results from the lab's first year of operation. One of their main focuses was on establishing an absolute time scale for the Wisconsin glaciation substages prior to what was known as the Mankato substage (the most recent glacial advance, around 9,000-11,000 years ago). Suess's acetylene method for carbon counting extended the dating range back to approximately 45,000 years, making it possible to fix in time pre-Mankato glacial events by dating wood and other organic material from older glacial deposits. Richard Foster Flint assembled a collection of samples that were dated at the lab. Some of the samples were collected by Rubin in collaboration with other geologists such as J Harlen Bretz (who was Rubin's Geomorphology professor at UChicago), Carl Leland Horberg, William John Wayne, Richard Parker Goldthwait, James Zumberge, and Donald Eschman. Samples were collected by other collectors as well. Flint and Rubin published a brief assessment of the stratigraphic meaning of these samples and their ^{14}C age determinations in May 1955. One of the conclusions was that a major glaciation began 25,000 or more years ago and reached a maximum about 20,000 years ago. The ^{14}C results were consistent.

In 1963, Rubin questioned the validity of ^{14}C dates from sea snail shells. Experiments showed that snails could uptake 10-12 percent inorganic carbonate from limestone, yielding an uncertainty in the ^{14}C dates of approximately one thousand years.

In 1964, Rubin and A. A. Rosen, of the U.S. Public Health Service, showed that by measuring ^{14}C content of surface water it is possible to determine the relative contributions of industrial pollution (from fossil fuels) and domestic pollution (from domestic sewage and garbage) in streams—desirable information for planning abatement measures. An activated carbon filter system was used to collect samples of organic contaminants in water, which were then extracted using chloroform and ethanol, and converted to acetylene for ^{14}C measurement, making use of a double-tube combustion system developed to completely burn the highly flammable samples in a controlled manner. Fossil carbon such as petroleum, natural gas, and coal is depleted in ^{14}C compared to the contemporary carbon in animal and plant matter. Their data was reported as a proportion of contemporary carbon to fossil carbon, and the results where consistent with the known pollution sources at the chosen sample sites, and provided new information at sites where this proportion could not be predicted by other means. This work was expanded upon in 1975 by Spiker and Rubin, when they published a water pollution study describing the measurement of ^{14}C activity of dissolved organic carbon (DOC) in surface water and groundwater, this time applying high-intensity ultraviolet radiation to large water samples to convert DOC to CO_{2} via photo-oxidation, for ^{14}C measurement. This was one of the early investigations of groundwater DOC impacted by industrial and municipal pollution.

In 1965, Bruce B. Hanshaw, William Back, and Rubin determined the origin of saline water contaminating the Ocala Limestone aquifer near Brunswick, Georgia by measuring the ^{14}C activity of water in and around the aquifer. They found that the contamination was coming from the underlying Claiborne Group, which had relatively low ^{14}C content due to lack of exposure to atmospheric carbon, and not from the nearby ocean. These results were in agreement with previous investigations using piezometric maps and other more traditional hydrologic data. This work laid the foundation for the use of carbon isotopes to delineate flow systems in regional carbonate aquifers.

First publishing together in 1967, George Plafker, Rubin, and their colleagues did painstaking fieldwork after the magnitude 9.2 Alaskan earthquake in 1964, covering hundreds of kilometers of Alaskan shoreline in small boats, helicopters, and float-equipped aircraft after the 1964 quake helped to launch a new field of megathrust earthquake geology, which used observations of the placement and ^{14}C dating of intertidal organisms such as acorn barnacles, mussels and rockweed to determine the amounts of vertical change in land relative to sea level near subduction zones. Plafker and his colleagues determined that the massive Alaskan quake was caused by rupture along a deeply buried fault in a subduction zone where the Pacific Plate thrusts north below the North American Plate. Earlier accounts of the Alaskan earthquake had suggested that the quake took place as slip along a vertical fault, as the Pacific Plate rotated counter-clockwise against the North American Plate. These studies by Plafker, Rubin and colleagues were very important evidence for the existence of subduction processes during the early debates of plate tectonics. See Plafker, Lajoie & Rubin 1992, pp. 436–453 for a geological and historical summary.

In 1968, Rubin co-authored with John Chapman Frye, H. B. Willman, and R. F. Black the official USGS "Definition of Wisconsinan Stage," which defined and described the Wisconsinan Stage of the Pleistocene and its substages as time-stratigraphic units for use in Illinois and Wisconsin.

In 1973, Rubin dated charcoal from campfires used by Paleo-Indians at Flint Run Complex in the Shenandoah Valley, Virginia, to be 10,000 years old—the oldest evidence of man in the state at the time.

Rubin thoroughly analyzed Mount St. Helens in the years and months preceding its 1980 eruption. He worked with Dwight Crandell and Donal R. Mullineaux on their paper published in 1975, which correctly predicted an eruption could occur before the turn of the century.

In 1977, Rubin collaborated with Harry E. Gove and others in early demonstrations of successful ^{14}C measurement using accelerator mass spectrometry (AMS) at the University of Rochester. Development of this technique made possible the 1988 radiocarbon dating of the Shroud of Turin, as it allowed for much smaller samples to be used. Gove had a central role in the Shroud project and brought Rubin in for his expertise.

What is today the Great Salt Lake in Utah was previously a massive Lake Bonneville which covered most of northern Utah. Rubin and colleagues determined the changing levels of this ancient lake including a catastrophic flood caused by a sudden overflow of the lake, known as the Bonneville flood. This very exciting epoch in the geologic history of North America was followed chronologically by Rubin in a series a radiocarbon dates, which contributed to publications such as "Great Salt Lake, and precursors, Utah: the last 30,000 years" (1984).

In August 1986, thousands of people were found dead on the shores of Lake Nyos, Cameroon. John P. Lockwood and Rubin found that the lake's maar may have been formed by an explosive eruption, and that CO_{2} could still be trapped under the lake—its gradual release into the waters setting the stage for the tragic gas-release event.

Rubin and colleagues contributed to our understanding of the evolution of Hawaiian volcanoes through hundreds of ^{14}C measurements starting in the late 60's, sample selection refinements, and significant publications in 1987.

Rubin carried out ^{14}C work, in collaboration with Lucio Lirer and Giuseppe Rolandi (University of Naples Federico II), a collaboration arranged by Rubin's long-time friend and fellow geologist Harvey E. Belkin, determining the age of the Breccia Museo (museum breccia), a proximal deposit attributed to the 39,000 BCE eruption of the Campanian Ignimbrite. The Breccia Museo deposit is controversial regarding its chronology and origin and this study added to that discussion and the realization that the deposit may be more complex and varied than had been understood.

== Awards and honors ==
In 1956, Rubin received a Washington Academy of Sciences Award in the Physical Sciences.

In 1974, Rubin received a Department of the Interior Meritorious Service Award.

Rubin was designated as a Scientist Emeritus for the Eastern Geology & Paleoclimate Science Center, now renamed the Florence Bascom Geoscience Center, Reston, VA, by the USGS.

On a less serious note, Rubin was also given the 1962 Geological Society of Washington Sleeping Bear Award for best humor during a GSW meeting.

== Personal life ==
Rubin was born in Chicago to Jewish immigrants from Kiev. He met his wife, Mary Louise Rubin (née Tucker), in high school. They raised three sons, John, Robert, and Mark, and were married for 72 years before she died in 2015.

Rubin made close friends through the US Army Air Force weatherman training, in Frank Wrobel, Mick McCullough, and Frank Getz, who were all shipped to different Pacific theaters during the war. Rubin was also close friends with Edward C. T. Chao, who is known for coesite, stishovite, and tektites, as they were both at one time in the USGS Branch of Military Geology, though they had no scientific relationship.

Rubin and Art Buchwald had at least two things in common — humor and kidney stones. Enabled by go-between Frank Forrester, "Project BUCHWALDSTONE" was a spoof project in which Rubin, Ed Dwornik and other scientists studied Buchwald's kidney stones, which were, according to Rubin, much smaller than his own.

Rubin was an avid kayaker in his prime, known on the Potomac River as "Dr. Kayak" by many. He wrote a spoof advice column in "The Cruiser" (newsletter of the Canoe Cruisers Association) under the same title. Rubin was also an enthusiastic collector of found bobbers.

He tested positive for COVID-19 during the COVID-19 pandemic in Virginia, and died a few days later.

== Publications ==
- Rubin, Meyer; Suess, Hans E. (8 April 1955). "U.S. Geological Survey Radiocarbon Dates II". Science. 121 (3145): 481–488. Bibcode:1955Sci...121..481R. doi:10.1126/science.121.3145.481. ISSN 0036-8075. PMID 17817378.
- Flint, Richard Foster; Rubin, Meyer (6 May 1955). "Radiocarbon Dates of Pre-Mankato Events in Eastern and Central North America". Science. 121 (3149): 649–658. Bibcode:1955Sci...121..649F. doi:10.1126/science.121.3149.649. ISSN 0036-8075. PMID 17769451. S2CID 23848648.
- Rubin, Meyer (1956), A Radiocarbon Chronology of Glacial Events During Wisconsin Time, Doctoral dissertation, University of Chicago, Department of Geology
- Rubin, Meyer; Alexander, Corrinne (27 June 1958). "U.S. Geological Survey Radiocarbon Dates IV". Science. 127 (3313): 1476–1487. Bibcode:1958Sci...127.1476R. doi:10.1126/science.127.3313.1476. PMID 17810539.
- Rubin, Meyer; Alexander, Corrinne (1960). "U. S. Geological Survey Radiocarbon Dates V" (PDF). Radiocarbon. 2: 129–185. doi:10.1017/S1061592X00020652.
- Rubin, Meyer; Berthold, Sarah M. (1961). "U. S. Geological Survey Radiocarbon Dates VI" (PDF). Radiocarbon. 3: 86–98. Bibcode:1961Radcb...3...86R. doi:10.1017/S0033822200020877.
- Redfield, Alfred C.; Rubin, Meyer (1962). "The Age of Salt Marsh Peat and Its Relation to Recent Changes in Sea Level at Barnstable, Massachusetts". Proceedings of the National Academy of Sciences. 48 (10): 1728–1735. Bibcode:1962PNAS...48.1728R. doi:10.1073/pnas.48.10.1728. ISSN 0027-8424. PMC 221031. PMID 16591005.
- Rubin, Meyer; Likins, Robert C.; Elmer, G. Berry (January 1963). "On the Validity of Radiocarbon Dates from Snail Shells". The Journal of Geology. 71 (1): 84–89. Bibcode:1963JG.....71...84R. doi:10.1086/626878. S2CID 129644650.
- Rosen, A. A.; Rubin, Meyer (1964). "Natural carbon-14 activity of organic substances in streams". Science. 143 (3611): 1163–1164. Bibcode:1964Sci...143.1163R. doi:10.1126/science.143.3611.1163. ISSN 0036-8075. PMID 17833900. S2CID 206564726.
- Rubin, Meyer (December 1964). "Dating on the Banks of the Potomac". Journal of the Washington Academy of Sciences. 54 (9): 356–357.
- Merrill, Arthur S.; Emery, K. O.; Rubin, Meyer (22 January 1965). "Ancient Oyster Shells on the Atlantic Continental Shelf". Science. 147 (3656): 398–400. Bibcode:1965Sci...147..398M. doi:10.1126/science.147.3656.398. ISSN 0036-8075. PMID 17832789. S2CID 33620579.
- Hanshaw, Bruce B.; Back, William; Rubin, Meyer; Wait, Robert L. (March 1965). "Relation of Carbon 14 Concentrations to Saline Water Contamination of Coastal Aquifers". Water Resources Research. 1 (1): 109–114. Bibcode:1965WRR.....1..109H. doi:10.1029/WR001i001p00109.
- Rosen, A. A.; Rubin, Meyer (September 1965). "Discriminating between Natural and Industrial Pollution through Carbon Dating". Journal of the Water Pollution Control Federation. 37 (9): 1302–1307. ISSN 1554-7531. JSTOR 25035373. PMID 5825885.
- Hanshaw, Bruce B.; Rubin, Meyer; Back, William; Friedman, Irving (1 January 1967), "Radiocarbon Determinations Applied to Groundwater Hydrology", Isotope Techniques in the Hydrologic Cycle, Geophysical Monograph Series, vol. 11, pp. 117–118, doi:10.1029/GM011p0117, ISBN 9780875900117
- Plafker, George; Rubin, Meyer (1967). "Vertical tectonic displacements in south-central Alaska during and prior to the great 1964 earthquake". Geosci. Osaka City Univ. 10: 53–66.
- Frye, John Chapman; Willman, H. B.; Rubin, Meyer; Black, Robert F. (1968), Definition of Wisconsinan Stage (PDF), Contributions to stratigraphy, Geological Survey bulletin, vol. 1274-E, Washington, DC: U.S. Government Printing Office, Bibcode:1968usgs.rept....1F, doi:10.3133/b1274E
- Sulivan, Beverly Marsters; Spiker, Elliott; Rubin, Meyer (1970). "U. S. Geological Survey Radiocarbon Dates XI". Radiocarbon. 12 (1): 319–334. Bibcode:1970Radcb..12..319S. doi:10.1017/S0033822200036365.
- Schmoll, H. R.; Szabo, B. J.; Rubin, Meyer; Dobrovolyn, Ernest (1 April 1972). "Radiometric Dating of Marine Shells from the Bootlegger Cove Clay, Anchorage Area, Alaska". Geological Society of America Bulletin. 83 (4): 1107–1114. Bibcode:1972GSAB...83.1107S. doi:10.1130/0016-7606(1972)83[1107:RDOMSF]2.0.CO;2.
- Spiker, E. C.; Rubin, Meyer (10 January 1975). "Petroleum Pollutants in Surface and Groundwater as Indicated by the Carbon-14 Activity of Dissolved Organic Carbon". Science. 187 (4171): 61–64. Bibcode:1975Sci...187...61S. doi:10.1126/science.187.4171.61. ISSN 0036-8075. PMID 17844210. S2CID 22094386.
- Crandell, Dwight R.; Mullineaux, Donal R.; Rubin, Meyer (7 February 1975). "Mount St. Helens Volcano: Recent and Future Behavior". Science. 187 (4175): 438–441. Bibcode:1975Sci...187..438C. doi:10.1126/science.187.4175.438. ISSN 0036-8075. PMID 17835309. S2CID 206569097.
- Plafker, G.; Hudson, T.; Bruns, T.; Rubin, M. (1978). "Late Quaternary offsets along the Fairweather fault and crustal plate interactions in southern Alaska". Canadian Journal of Earth Sciences. 15 (5): 805–816. Bibcode:1978CaJES..15..805P. doi:10.1139/e78-085.
- Plafker, George; Rubin, Meyer (1978). "Uplift history and earthquake recurrence as deduced from marine terraces on Middleton Island, Alaska" (PDF). US Geol. Surv. Open File Rep., 78. 943: 687–721. Archived (PDF) from the original on October 6, 2019.
- Kelley, M L; Spiker, E C; Lipman, P W; Lockwood, J P; Lipman, P W; Holcomb, R T; Rubin, M (1979). "U. S. Geological Survey, Reston, Virginia, Radiocarbon Dates XV: Mauna Loa and Kilauea Volcanoes, Hawaii". Radiocarbon. 21 (2): 306–320. Bibcode:1979Radcb..21..306K. doi:10.1017/S0033822200004434.
- Gove, Harry E.; Elmore, David; Ferraro, R. D.; Beukens, R. P.; Chang, K. H.; Kilius, L. R.; Lee, H. W.; Litherland, A. E.; Purser, K. H.; Rubin, Meyer (1980). "Radiocarbon Dating with Tandem Electrostatic Accelerators" (PDF). Radiocarbon. 22 (3): 785–793. Bibcode:1980Radcb..22..785G. doi:10.1017/S003382220001016X.
- Elmore, David; Gove, Harry E.; Beukens, R. P.; Litherland, A. E.; Purser, K. H.; Rubin, Meyer, "A method for dating the Shroud of Turin", La Sindone e la Scienza: 428–436
- Scott, W.E.; McCoy, W.D.; Shroba, R.R.; Rubin, M. (1983). "Reinterpretation of the exposed record of the last two cycles of Lake Bonneville, Western United States". Quaternary Research. 20 (3): 261–285. Bibcode:1983QuRes..20..261S. doi:10.1016/0033-5894(83)90013-3. S2CID 128690082. Archived from the original on January 2, 2017.
- Whitney, John W.; Faulkender, D. J.; Rubin, M. (1983), "The environmental history and present condition of Saudi Arabia's northern sand seas", Open-File Report, 83–749, U.S. Geological Survey, doi:10.3133/ofr83749
- Spencer, R.J.; Baedecker, M.J.; Eugster, H.P.; Forester, R.M.; Goldhaber, M.B.; Jones, B.F.; Kelts, K.; McKenzie, J.; Madsen, D.B.; Rettig, S.L.; Rubin, M.; Bowser, C.J. (December 1984). "Great Salt Lake, and precursors, Utah: The last 30,000 years". Contributions to Mineralogy and Petrology. 86 (4): 321–334. Bibcode:1984CoMP...86..321S. doi:10.1007/BF01187137. ISSN 0010-7999. S2CID 128621985.
- Rubin, Meyer; Lockwood, John P.; Friedman, Irving (1987), Effects of volcanic emanations on carbon-isotope content of modern plants near Kilauea Volcano (PDF), US Geol. Surv. Prof. Pap., vol. 1350, pp. 209–211, archived from the original (PDF) on 25 February 2017
- Rubin, Meyer; Gargulinski, Lea Kelley; McGeehin, John P. (1987), Hawaiian radiocarbon dates (PDF), US Geol. Surv. Prof. Pap., vol. 1350, pp. 213–242, archived from the original (PDF) on 25 February 2017
- Lockwood, John P.; Rubin, Meyer (1989). "Origin and age of the Lake Nyos maar, Cameroon". Journal of Volcanology and Geothermal Research. 39 (2–3): 117–124. Bibcode:1989JVGR...39..117L. doi:10.1016/0377-0273(89)90052-8.
- Lirer, L.; Rolandi, G.; Rubin, M. (1991). "^{14}C Age of the "Museum Breccia" (Campi Flegrei) and its relevance for the origin of the Campanian Ignimbrite". Journal of Volcanology and Geothermal Research. 48 (1–2): 223–227. Bibcode:1991JVGR...48..223L. doi:10.1016/0377-0273(91)90044-Z.
- Plafker, G.; Lajoie, K.R.; Rubin, M. (1992), Determining recurrence intervals of great subduction zone earthquakes in southern Alaska by radiocarbon dating. In: Radiocarbon After Four Decades., New York, NY: Springer, pp. 436–453, doi:10.1007/978-1-4757-4249-7_28
