= Samuel B. Mukasa =

Ugandan-American geochemist and academic administrator

- Education: University of New Hampshire (BS); Ohio State University (MS); University of California, Santa Barbara (PhD)
- Known for: Research in isotope geochemistry and tectonic evolution
- Scientific career
- Fields: Geochemistry, geochronology, petrology
- Workplaces: SUNY College of Environmental Science and Forestry; University of Minnesota; University of New Hampshire; University of Michigan; University of Florida

Samuel B. Mukasa is a geochemist and academic administrator. He is a former executive vice president and provost of the SUNY College of Environmental Science and Forestry (SUNY ESF) and a professor emeritus at the University of Minnesota.

Mukasa previously served as dean of the College of Science and Engineering at the University of Minnesota, dean of the College of Engineering and Physical Sciences at the University of New Hampshire, and chair of the Department of Geological Sciences at the University of Michigan. He was president of the Geochemical Society from 2010 to 2011 and was elected a fellow of the African Academy of Sciences in 2023.

== Early life and education ==
Mukasa was born in Kenya to Ugandan parents. He received a bachelor's degree in geology from the University of New Hampshire in 1977 and a master's degree in geology from Ohio State University in 1980. He earned a PhD in geochemistry from the University of California, Santa Barbara, in 1984. He completed postdoctoral research at the Lamont-Doherty Earth Observatory of Columbia University.

== Academic career ==
From 1985 to 1989, Mukasa was an assistant professor in the Department of Geology at the University of Florida. He joined the University of Michigan in 1989 and remained on its faculty for 21 years. From 2007 to 2010, he chaired the Department of Geological Sciences, later renamed the Department of Earth and Environmental Sciences. In 2008, he was appointed the Eric J. Essene Collegiate Professor of Geological Sciences.

Mukasa moved to the University of New Hampshire in 2010 and served as dean of its College of Engineering and Physical Sciences from 2011 to 2016.

Mukasa became dean of the College of Science and Engineering at the University of Minnesota in August 2016. He held the position until 2021.

In November 2021, Mukasa was appointed executive vice president and provost of SUNY ESF. His appointment was also reported by The Journal of Blacks in Higher Education. He was granted provost emeritus status effective January 1, 2025.

Mukasa served as president of the Geochemical Society from 2010 to 2011. He also served as an associate editor of the Geological Society of America Bulletin from 1995 to 1998.

== Research ==
Mukasa's research has examined the chemical composition and geological evolution of the Earth's mantle and crust. His work uses trace-element analysis and radiogenic isotope systems, including lead, neodymium, strontium, hafnium, and osmium, to investigate the origins of igneous rocks and geological processes associated with plate tectonics. He has also employed uranium–lead dating and argon–argon dating to investigate the timing of geological events.

In a 1987 study published in Geology, Mukasa and John N. Ludden used uranium–lead dating of zircon crystals from the Troodos Ophiolite in Cyprus to constrain the age of its formation. Their analysis yielded an estimated crystallization age of approximately 91.6 million years for plagiogranite samples, providing evidence about the timing of oceanic crust formation in the eastern Mediterranean.

Mukasa also co-authored research on mantle metasomatism, including a 2002 study of peridotite xenoliths from Spitsbergen. Published in the Journal of Petrology, the study examined the chemical effects of interactions between mantle rocks and migrating melts, using trace-element compositions and numerical modelling.

A substantial part of Mukasa's research has concerned Antarctica, particularly the geological history of Marie Byrd Land, the West Antarctic Rift System, and the relationship between Antarctic magmatism and the breakup of Gondwana. He co-authored a 1994 study examining the relationship between Antarctica–New Zealand rifting, magmatism in Marie Byrd Land, and mantle processes. The study proposed links between mid-Cretaceous magmatism, ridge subduction, and mantle plume activity.

In a 2000 paper with Ian Dalziel, Mukasa investigated the geological evolution of West Antarctica's Pacific margin using zircon uranium–lead geochronology and feldspar lead-isotope data. The research examined the timing and geological development of Marie Byrd Land within the broader history of Gondwana.

In a 2020 study published in the Journal of Geophysical Research: Solid Earth, he and his co-authors analyzed submarine basalt samples dredged from the Chukchi Borderland in the western Arctic Ocean. Using argon–argon geochronology, major- and trace-element analysis, and isotope geochemistry, the researchers examined the origins and timing of volcanic activity associated with the geological development of the Amerasia Basin. The study identified several episodes of Cretaceous volcanic activity and considered their implications for tectonic models of Arctic Ocean basin formation.

== Honors and recognition ==
Mukasa was elected a fellow of the Geological Society of America in 2004 and is also a fellow of the American Association for the Advancement of Science. He was elected to the African Academy of Sciences in 2023.

He received a distinguished alumnus award from the University of California, Santa Barbara in 2006 and an honorary doctorate from Nkumba University in Uganda in 2008.
