= John Rodgers (geologist) =

American geologist and professor at Yale University

John Rodgers (11 July 1914 – 7 March 2004) was an American geologist who was Silliman Professor of Geology at Yale University.

== Biography ==
He was born in Albany, New York to Henry and Louise (Allen) Rodgers and was educated at Albany Academy. He then studied at Cornell University, where he was awarded a B.A. in 1936 and an M.S. in geology in 1937. He gained a post-graduate Ph.D. at Yale University in 1944. In the latter year, during the Second World War, he joined the Military Geology Branch of the United States Geological Survey and was delegated to map beachheads from Kamchatka in Siberia down to China and Japan.

In 1946 he accepted a post in the Department of Geology at Yale, becoming in 1962 the Benjamin Silliman Professor, a position he was to hold for the rest of his career. At Yale he began to research the geology of Connecticut, producing a full geological map of the state in 1985.

In 1948 he was appointed an assistant editor of the American Journal of Science, becoming its editor from 1954 to 1995. In 1970 he served as president of the Geological Society of America. He was a Guggenheim Fellow in 1973–74.

In his private life he was a proficient pianist and linguist. He died in 2004 at his home in Hamden, Connecticut and is buried at Evergreen Cemetery, New Haven in a plot reserved for people who have donated their bodies to science.

== Honors and awards ==
- Member, National Academy of Sciences
- Member, American Academy of Arts and Sciences
- Member, American Philosophical Society
- Fellow, American Association for the Advancement of Science
- Fellow, Geological Society of America
- 1947 Medal of Freedom from the U. S. Army
- 1981 Penrose Medal of the Geological Society of America
- 1987 Prix Gaudry of the Geological Society of France
- 1987 Fourmarier Medal of the Royal Academy of Science, Letters and Fine Arts of Belgium

== Works ==
- Principles of Stratigraphy with Carl Dunbar (1957)
- The Company I Kept, autobiography (2001)
