= Nelson Horatio Darton =

American geologist

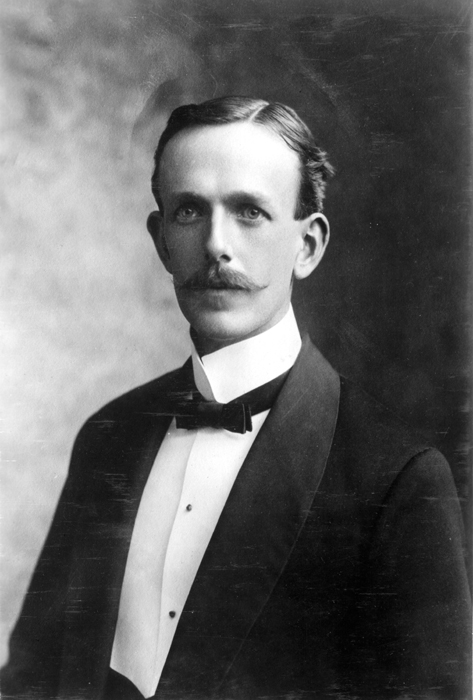
- Darton in about 1895
- Born: December 17, 1865; Brooklyn, New York, United States
- Died: February 28, 1948 (aged 82); Washington, DC, United States
- Education: California Institute of Technology and Harvard University
- Awards: Penrose Medal (1940)
- Scientific career
- Fields: Marine Geology
- Workplaces: US Geological Survey

Nelson Horatio Darton (December 17, 1865 – February 28, 1948) was a geologist who worked for the United States Geological Survey. He was born in Brooklyn, New York, started working in his uncle's drug business at thirteen years old, and becoming a practicing chemist. His interest in geology started as a sideline, and he was hired by the U.S. Geological Survey in 1886.

Darton was an expert at geological photography, a noted geological map maker, and a hydrogeologist. He was awarded the Penrose Medal in 1940. He also made some important paleontological discoveries.

He retired in 1936 at the age of 71 but was allowed to keep his office at the USGS, and he continued an active geological career with a focus on the geology of the Washington DC area. He produced more than 200 publications and received many honors and awards. Three weeks before he died in 1948, he was still coming daily to the USGS and gave a lecture to the Geological Society of Washington on the geology of the DC area.

== Publications ==
- Preliminary report on the geology and underground water resources of the central Great Plains U.S. Geological Survey Professional Paper 32(1905)
- Geology of the Owl Creek Mountains, with notes on resources of adjoining regions in the ceded portion of the Shoshone Indian Reservation, Wyoming United States 59th Congress, Senate Document no. 219, (1906)
- Description of Bald Mountain and Dayton quadrangles, Wyoming U.S. Geological Survey Geologic Atlas, folio 141 (1906)
- Description of Cloud Peak and Fort McKinney quadrangles, Wyoming U.S. Geological Survey Geologic Atlas, folio 142 (1906)
- Geology of the Bighorn Mountains U.S. Geological Survey Professional Paper 51 (1906)
- Geology and underground waters of the Arkansas Valley in eastern Colorado U.S. Geological Survey Professional Paper 52 (1906)
- Paleozoic and Mesozoic of central Wyoming:. Geological Society of America Bulletin, v. 19, p. 403–470 (1908)
- Geology and water resources of the northern portion of the Black Hills and adjoining regions in South Dakota and Wyoming U.S. Geological Survey Professional Paper 65 (1909)
- Description of the Laramie and Sherman quadrangles, Wyoming with E. Blackwelder, and C.E. Siebenthal U.S. Geological Survey Geologic Atlas, folio 173 (1910)
- Description of the central Black Hills, South Dakota with S. Paige U.S. Geological Survey Geologic Atlas, folio 219 (1925)
- Story of the Grand Canyon: How It Was Made, pamphlet, published by Fred Harvey, 1917
