= Philip Burke King =

American geologist (1903–1987)

- Born: September 24, 1903; Chester, Indiana, USA
- Died: April 25, 1987 (aged 83)
- Education: Iowa State University and Yale University
- Awards: Penrose Medal (1965)
- Scientific career
- Fields: Geology
- Workplaces: US Geological Survey

Philip Burke King (September 24, 1903 – April 25, 1987) was a geologist who worked for the United States Geological Survey. He was born in Chester, Indiana. King graduated from Iowa State University (B.A., 1924; M.S., 1927) and Yale University (Ph.D., 1929). He spent most of his career from 1930 onward as a geologist with the U.S. Geological Survey. He taught at universities for short periods: (Texas, 1925–27), Arizona (1929–30), UCLA (1954–56), and in the autumn of 1965 was a visiting lecturer at the University of Moscow.

In 1965, he was awarded the Penrose Medal of the Geological Society of America and the Distinguished Service Medal of the U.S. Department of Interior. He was elected to the American Academy of Arts and Sciences in 1966. He was attending the International Geological Congress meeting in Prague in August, 1968, when the Soviets invaded; he was evacuated to Nuremberg.

King did his early field work (1925) in the Marathon region, an area of about 1,600 square miles (4,100 km^{2}) in the trans-Pecos part of Texas, where varied rocks and structures that were formed during the Paleozoic have been stripped of the cover of younger strata that conceal them elsewhere in this part of the Southwest. His first field work in the Marathon region was on Permian marine strata that form a sequence about 7,000 feet (2,100 m) thick on the northern side of the Glass Mountains. Instead of an orderly sequence, the strata of the Glass Mountains were a disorderly array of discontinuous bodies of carbonate rocks, shale, and sandstone. An opportunity to clarify the Permian stratigraphy of western Texas came later (1934), when King began work in the southern Guadalupe Mountains about 150 miles (240 km) northwest of the Glass Mountains. During King's field work there, he gave much attention to the Capitan Limestone, which stands in lofty white cliffs at the summit of the mountains.

In 1940–44, the wartime search for strategic minerals by the U.S. Geological Survey afforded King an opportunity to investigate the Appalachian Mountains in Virginia and Tennessee where he unraveled and interpreted the massive folds and low-angle thrusts of that region. As he did these earlier investigations, he was aware of their broader significance and developed regional syntheses that resulted in his publications Evolution of North America (1959), the Tectonic Map of the United States (1944; 2nd ed. 1962; National Atlas version 1989), and the compilation of the Tectonic Map of North America (1969).

In 1974, he and Helen Beikman produced the Geologic Map of the United States. King and Beikman's work lives on into the digital age. Their map was re-released, complete with ArcInfo coverages, as U.S. Geological Survey Digital Data Series DDS-11, Release 2 ( https://minerals.usgs.gov/kb/).

This map was combined by José F. Vigil, Richard J. Pike, and David G. Howell in 2000, with the digital shaded-relief image created by Thelin and Pike in 1991, to create A Tapestry of Time and Terrain ( https://web.archive.org/web/20030209053037/http://tapestry.usgs.gov/ and https://geopubs.wr.usgs.gov/i-map/i2720/).
