= Obsidian hydration dating =

Geochemical dating method

Obsidian hydration dating (OHD) is a geochemical method of determining age in either absolute or relative terms of an artifact made of obsidian.

Obsidian is a volcanic glass that was used by prehistoric people as a raw material in the manufacture of stone tools such as projectile points, knives, or other cutting tools through knapping, or breaking off pieces in a controlled manner, such as pressure flaking.

Obsidian obeys the property of mineral hydration and absorbs water, when exposed to air at a well-defined rate. When an unworked nodule of obsidian is initially fractured, there is typically less than 1% water present. Over time, water slowly diffuses into the artifact forming a narrow "band", "rim", or "rind" that can be seen and measured with many different techniques such as a high-power microscope with 40–80 power magnification, depth profiling with SIMS (secondary ion mass spectrometry), and IR-PAS (infra red photoacoustic spectroscopy). In order to use obsidian hydration for absolute dating, the conditions that the sample has been exposed to and its origin must be understood or compared to samples of a known age (e.g. as a result of radiocarbon dating of associated materials).

== History ==
Obsidian hydration dating was introduced in 1960 by Irving Friedman and Robert Smith of the U.S. Geological Survey. Their initial work focused on obsidians from archaeological sites in western North America.

The use of Secondary ion mass spectrometry (SIMS) in the measurement of obsidian hydration dating was introduced by two independent research teams in 2002.

Today the technique is applied extensively by archaeologists to date prehistoric sites and sites from prehistory in California and the Great Basin of North America. It has also been applied in South America, the Middle East, the Pacific Islands, including New Zealand and Mediterranean Basin.

== Techniques ==
=== Conventional procedure ===
To measure the hydration band, a small slice of material is typically cut from an artifact. This sample is ground down to about 30 micrometers thick and mounted on a petrographic slide (this is called a thin section). The hydration rind is then measured under a high-power microscope outfitted with some method for measuring distance, typically in tenths of micrometers. The technician measures the microscopic amount of water absorbed on freshly broken surfaces. The principle behind obsidian hydration dating is simple–the longer the artifact surface has been exposed, the thicker the hydration band will be.

=== Secondary ion mass spectrometry (SIMS) procedure ===
In case of measuring the hydration rim using the depth profiling ability of the secondary ion mass spectrometry technique, the sample is mounted on a holder without any preparation or cutting. This method of measurement is non-destructive. There are two general SIMS modes: static mode and dynamic mode, depending on the primary ion current density, and three different types of mass spectrometers: magnetic sector, quadrupole and time-of-flight (TOF). Any mass-spectrometer can work in static mode (very low ion current, a top mono-atomic layer analysis), and dynamic mode (a high ion current density, in-depth analysis).

Although relatively infrequent the use of SIMS on obsidian surface investigations has produced great progress in OHD dating. SIMS in general refers to four instrumental categories according to their operation; static, dynamic, quadrupole, and time-of-flight, TOF. In essence it is a technique with a large resolution on a plethora of chemical elements and molecular structures in an essentially non destructive manner. An approach to OHD with a completely new rationale suggests that refinement of the technique is possible in a manner which improves both its accuracy and precision and potentially expands the utility by generating reliable chronological data. Anovitz et al. presented a model which relied solely on compositionally-dependent diffusion, following numerical solutions (finite difference (FD), or finite element) elaborating on the H+ profile acquired by SIMS. A test of the model followed using results from Mount 65, Chalco in Mexico by Riciputi et al. This technique used numerical calculation to model the formation of the entire diffusion profile as a function of time and fitted the derived curve to the hydrogen profile. The FD equations are based on a number of assumptions about the behavior of water as it diffused into the glass and characteristic points of the SIMS H+ diffusion profile.

In Rhodes, Greece, under the direction and invention of Ioannis Liritzis, the dating approach is based on modeling the S-like hydrogen profile by SIMS, following Fick's diffusion law, and an understanding of the surface saturation layer (see Figure). In fact, the saturation layer on the surface forms up to a certain depth depending on factors that include the kinetics of the diffusion mechanism for the water molecules, the specific chemical structure of obsidian, as well as the external conditions affecting diffusion (temperature, relative humidity, and pressure). Together these factors result in the formation of an approximately constant, boundary concentration value, in the external surface layer. Using the end product of diffusion, a phenomenological model has been developed, based on certain initial and boundary conditions and appropriate physicochemical mechanisms, that express the H_{2}O concentration versus depth profile as a diffusion/time equation.

This latest advance, the novel secondary ion mass spectrometry–surface saturation (SIMS-SS), thus, involves modelling the hydrogen concentration profile of the surface versus depth, whereas the age determination is reached via equations describing the diffusion process, while topographical effects have been confirmed and monitored through atomic force microscopy.

== Limitations ==
Several factors complicate simple correlation of obsidian hydration band thickness with absolute age. Temperature is known to speed up the hydration process. Thus, artifacts exposed to higher temperatures, for example by being at lower elevation, seem to hydrate faster. As well, obsidian chemistry, including the intrinsic water content, seems to affect the rate of hydration. Once an archeologist can control for the geochemical signature of the obsidian (e.g., the "source") and temperature (usually approximated using an "effective hydration temperature" or EHT coefficient), he or she may be able to date the artifact using the obsidian hydration technique. Water vapor pressure may also affect the rate of obsidian hydration.

The reliability of the method based on Friedman's empirical age equation (x²=kt, where x is the thickness of the hydration rim, k is the diffusion coefficient, and t is the time) is questioned from several grounds regarding temperature dependence, square root of time and determination of diffusion rate per sample and per site, as part of some successful attempts on the procedure and applications. The SIMS-SS age calculation procedure is separated into two major steps. The first step concerns the calculation of a 3rd order fitting polynomial of the SIMS profile (eq. 1). The second stage regards the determination of the saturation layer, i.e. its depth and concentration. The whole computing processing is embedded in stand-alone software created in Matlab (version 7.0.1) software package with a graphical user interface and executable under Windows XP. Thus, the SIMS-SS age equation in years before present is given in eq. 2:

$c=e^{a+bx+cx^2+dx^3}$
Eq. 1 Fitting polynomial of the SIMS profile

$T=\frac{(C_1-C_2)^2\left(\frac{1.128}{1-\frac{0.177kC_1}{C_2}}\right)^2}{4Dse\!f\!\!f\left(\left.\frac{\mathrm dC}{\mathrm dx}\right|_{x=0}\right)^2}$
Eq. 2 The SIMS-SS age equation in years before present

Where, Ci is the intrinsic concentration of water, Cs is the saturation concentration, dC/dx is the diffusion coefficient for depth x=0, k is derived from a family of Crank's theoretical diffusion curves, and $Ds,eff$ is an effective diffusion coefficient (eq. 3) which relates the inverse gradient of the fit polynomial to well dated samples:

D_{s,eff} = aD_{s} + b/ (10^{22}D_{s}) = 8.051e^{−6}D_{s}+0.999/(1022D_{s}), Eq. 3

where Ds = (1/(dC/dx))10^{−11} assuming a constant flux and taken as unity. The eq. (2) and assumption of unity is a matter of further investigation.

Several commercial companies and university laboratories provide obsidian hydration services.

== See also ==
- Dating methodology (archaeology)
