= Frank C. Whitmore Jr. =

American paleontologist (1915–2012)

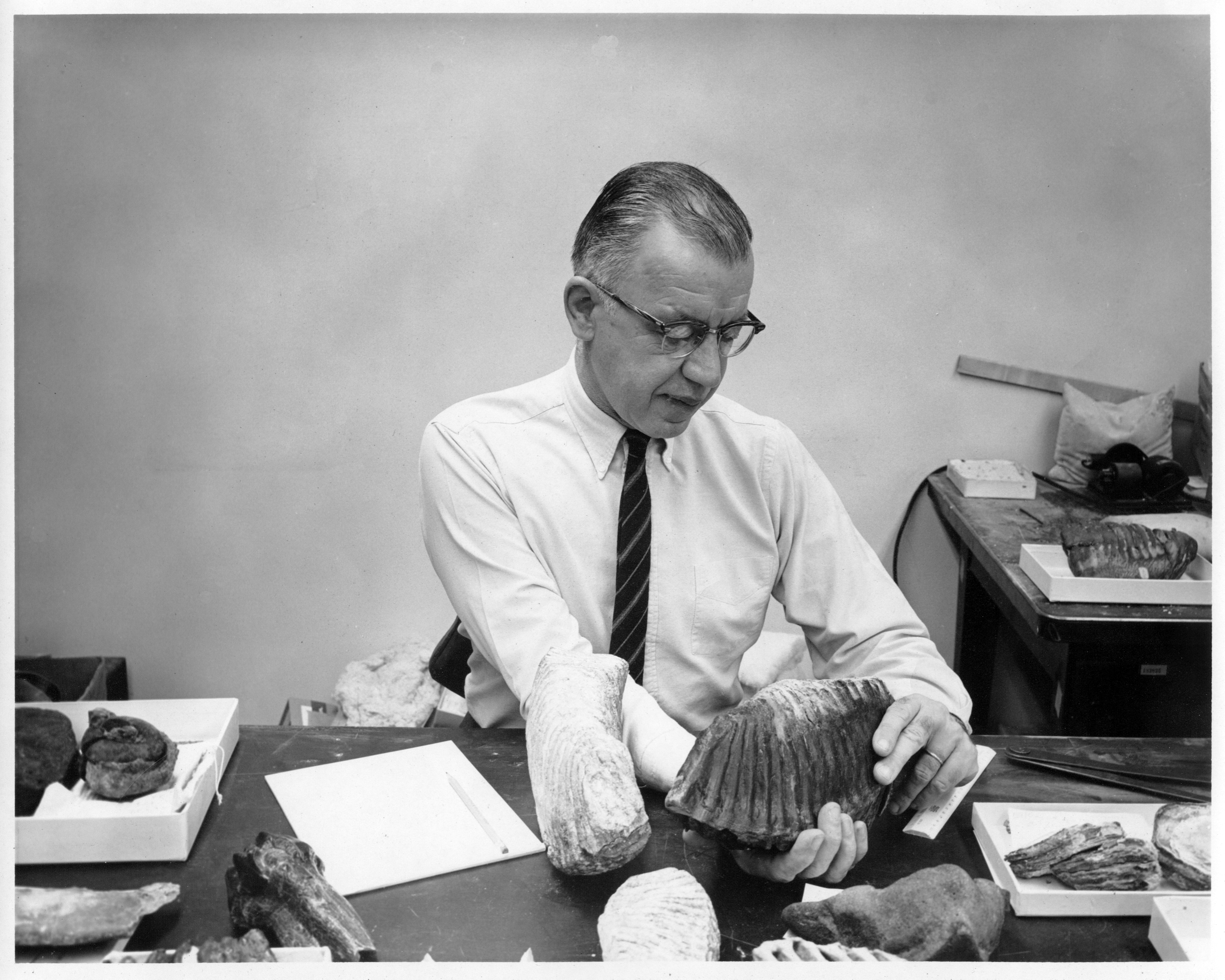
Whitmore c. 1967

Frank Clifford Whitmore Jr. (November 17, 1915 – March 18, 2012) was an American geologist including chief of the Military Geology Unit of the United States Geological Survey, vertebrate paleontologist with the Paleontology and Stratigraphy Branch of the United States Geological Survey, awardee of the Medal of Freedom, fellow of the Geological Society of America, fellow of the American Association for the Advancement of Science, Penrose Medal citationist, awardee of the Thomas Jefferson Medal for Outstanding Contributions to Natural Science, Honorable Kentucky Colonel, member of the National Geographic Society Committee for Research and Exploration, founding member of the Society of Vertebrate Paleontology, recipient of the Meritorious Service Award by the United States Department of Interior.

== Early life and education ==
Whitmore was born at home in Cambridge, Massachusetts, on November 17, 1915, to Marin Gertrude (Mason) and Frank Clifford Whitmore, then a graduate student at Harvard University and later a prominent chemist. In 1934, Whitmore enrolled as an English major at Amherst College, Massachusetts. To complete his science requirement Whitmore took historical geology taught by F. B. Loomis. Whitmore was the only student who signed up so Loomis geared the class heavily on vertebrate evolution, his research interest. By the end of that year, Whitmore decided he wanted to be a vertebrate paleontologist."

Whitmore completed his B.S. cum laude with honorable mention in geology from Amherst centered on vertebrate paleontology and his M.S. from Penn State studying paleontology under Frank M. Swartz and stratigraphy under Paul Kimitrie Kyrine. Whitmore continued his education at Harvard University, studying under vertebrate paleontologist, Alfred Sherwood Romer. Whitmore was Romer's first student from the geology department; all previous students had been from biology. Whitmore's first real field experience in vertebrate paleontology came during the summer of 1940 when he traveled with the Harvard field crew to the Uinta Basin of Utah to collect fossil mammals. While working on his doctorate Whitmore served as a teaching fellow and university fellow in paleontology.

Whitmore's doctoral study, suggested by Romer, was the cranial morphology of three Oligocene artiodactyls. Whitmore wrote, "It is the purpose of this study to examine in detail the cranial anatomy of some of these extinct genera, because endocranial characteristics are probably nonadaptive, that is, unlikely to be influenced by the environment, and therefore useful in determining the taxonomic position of groups of animals." For this study, a serial sectioning apparatus was designed and built by F. Russell Olsen of Harvard's Museum of Comparative Zoology. This sectioning technique, perfected for paleobotany with cellulose acetate peels, was adapted for vertebrates and described in a paper by Olsen and Whitmore. It was a pioneering achievement in its approach and formed the basis of later work by others, in which details of cranial anatomy such as blood circulation, ear morphology, and brain configuration have been used in polygenetic studies of fossil mammals.

== Career as teacher, geologist and World War II ==
Whitmore's first postgraduate job was a teaching position at Rhode Island State College (now the University of Rhode Island) from 1942 to 1944. When the Army Specialized Training Program came to the college, he also taught economic and political geography. Preparation for these courses aided him most in the next phase of his career.

In March 1944, Whitemore was hired by the U.S. Geological Survey to edit classified reports in the one-year old Military Geology Unit. By September 1945, he had become chief editor, supervising four geologists and 15 typists and draftsmen. Whitmore moved to the Engineer Intelligence Division, Southwest Pacific Area. His position as scientific consultant on terrain intelligence took him first to Manila, where he organized the Natural Resources Section of the General Headquarters of the Supreme Commander for the Allied Powers, in preparation for the occupation of Japan. After two months, he relocated to Tokyo, where he served as chief of the Engineering Geology Unit, Natural Resources Section. He supervised the field checking of terrain intelligence reports and consulted with the U.S. Army on foundation conditions, location of construction materials, and selection of airfield and port sites. Whitmore became a commodity specialist in precious metals, compiling data on gold and silver production in Japan. As Whitmore tells it, "Since I was the paleontologist and didn't know much, they looked around for the least harmful thing for me to do. That's how I was put in charge of the precious metals. My job was mainly to hold audience with Japanese gold and silver mine operations and tell them 'no,' they could not mine gold. It was the perfect bureaucrat's job, sitting there all day saying 'no.' I was also in charge of the vaults of Japan, where I saw more money than I will ever see again, with piles of sheet gold one meter on a side." There were also stacks of platinum crucibles and "buckets of diamonds."

One example the unit's work was the identification of where Japanese Fire Bomb Balloons were being launched. From late 1944 until early 1945, the Japanese launched over 9,300 of fire balloons, of which 300 were found or observed in the U.S. Despite the high hopes of their designers, the balloons were ineffective as weapons; causing only six deaths (from one single incident) and a small amount of damage. Some of the ballast sandbags dropped by the balloons were taken to the Military Geology Unit for investigation. The geologists began microscopic and chemical examination of the sand to determine types and distribution of diatoms and other microscopic sea creatures, and its mineral composition. They determined that the sand could not be coming from American beaches, nor from the mid-Pacific. It had to be coming from Japan. The geologists ultimately determined the precise beaches in Japan where the sand had been taken. In 1946 the U.S. Army recognized his work with the highest civilian award the United States bestows, the Medal of Freedom.

While Whitmore was working in Japan a controversy broke out. The story of Peking Man fossils involved bones of Sinathropus pekingenis and other relics, which the Japanese had earlier stolen from China. Whitmore, as part of his duties, was to take custody of these specimens, pending their return to the National Geological Survey of China. But there had always been disagreement over the actual location of the specimens and the sequence of events prior to Whitmore's arrival on the scene. According to one story, in 1941 the specimens were packed in three cases marked "secret" and turned over to the U.S. Marines who were evacuating Chinwangtao, China, aboard the Dollar Line President Harrison. The liner ran aground in the Yangtze River near Shanghai on December 8, and the marines were captured. There is documentary evidence that scientists from the Tokyo Imperial University visited Peking in August, 1942, at the request of the Japanese North China Army and took the collection to Tokyo. After the surrender of Japan to the Allied powers, a letter from the Central Liaison Office of Japan alerted the Allies to the collection's existence. The natural Resources Section was directed to take action to return the specimens, and the section chief dispatched Whitmore to examine the collation. In his memo, Whitmore stated he could "find no traces of Sinanthropus." Many believe the fossils rest at the bottom of the Yangtze River. To this day, the original fossils have never been recovered, but good casts exist and excavations at the Peking Man site have turned up additional specimens.

In the spring of 1946 Whitmore was assigned to the 24th Corps. U.S. Army in Korea to survey and map railroads, major highways, landing beaches and ports, including Inchon, which played an important part in the later U.S. invasion. While in Korea, Whitmore was promoted to chief of the Military Geology Unit.

After the war it was assumed that the Military Geology Unit would be shut down, but the war had demonstrated to the U.S. military how little it knew about foreign geology, and so the unit was transformed into the regular branch of the U.S. Geological Survey. Whitmore stayed on as chief until 1959. The branch directed worldwide activities employing about 120 scientists and support personnel, with headquarters in Washington, D.C. and field offices in Tokyo, Heidelberg, and Salzburg. Whitmore organized interdisciplinary field-mapping programs involving the study of geology, soils, vegetation, hydrology, and topography. Whitmore chaired numerous groups including the U.S. Geological Survey's Geologic Division Staffing Committee and the committee to compile permafrost terms for the first and second editions of the American Geological Institute's Glossary of Geology. He also served as security officer for the Geologic Division between 1948 and 1956.

In recognition of the International Geophysical Year in 1958, the Lake Peters Research Station (renamed the G. William Holmes Research Station in 1970) was established in the northeastern part of the Brooks Range of Alaska. Whitmore was on the team that conducted the initial reconnaissance at this offshoot of the Arctic Research Laboratory at Point Barrow and formulated plans for continuing research in the area.

== Career as vertebrate paleontologist ==
After 15 years of administration, Whitmore joined the Paleontology and Stratigraphy Branch of the U.S. Geological Survey as a senior specialist in vertebrate paleontology. He was assigned an office at the National Museum of Natural History, Smithsonian Institution. Whitmore became the informal chief of the survey's vertebrate paleontology staff, which included Charles Repenning at the Menlo Park, California, office and Ed Lewis at the Denver, Colorado, office. Whitmore launched a series of diverse investigations. In 1959 and 1960, he collected and studied Miocene and Pleistocene vertebrates from Martha's Vineyard, Massachusetts, as part of the work done by the Engineering Geology Branch. His biostratigraphy of that complexly deformed area helped determine the history of Pleistocene deformation on the island.

From 1959 through 1965, Whitmore conducted biostratigraphic studies of Paleozoic and Mesozoic fish and Tertiary mammals from Wyoming and Montana to aid ongoing geologic mapping there. He was principal investigator for field and laboratory studies of Miocene mammals from Panama between 1962 and 1965. This work resulted many accomplishments including a biostratigraphic correlation with faunas in Texas and Florida, established that the Miocene mammalian fauna of Panama was entirely of North American affinity, helped to define a circum-Caribbean Miocene zoogeographic province and delineated the southern extent of the North American land mass. These results were published in Science. At about the same time, Whitmore began collaborating with C. Bertrand Schulz and Lloyd Tanner of the University of Nebraska on work at Big Bone Lick, Kentucky. This important Pleistocene site is the type locality of Mammut americanum, the American mastodon, and Bootherium bombifrons, an extinct musk ox. It was also the site where, on Thomas Jefferson's orders, explorers Lewis and Clark collected bones for shipment back to the amateur scientist and president of the United States.

The team's field work and research of the late Pleistocene mammals and stratigraphy of Kentucky from 1963 through 1970 contributed to the first geomorphological and paleoclimatological understanding of the Ohio valley. After five summers of field work, their results helped convince the state of Kentucky to create Big Bone Lick State Park, ensuring preservation of the site. For his efforts, Whitemore was anointed an Honorable Kentucky Colonel by the state. It was during this time that Whitmore and colleagues also undertook the study of Pleistocene vertebrate fossils found on the Atlantic continental shelf. These studies, based largely on fossil elephant teeth dredged up by hard clam vessels, helped to establish sea level changes and its effect on paleozoogeography.

Meanwhile, Whitmore was also being exposed to fossil marine mammals, thanks to his close association with Remington Kellogg, who worked in the Paleobiology Department of the National Museum of Natural History. Whitmore increasingly helped the elder paleontologist and, after his death in 1969, took over some of his work. During the late 1960s and early 1970s, Whitmore was principal investigator for the Calvert Cliffs Paleontology Project on Chesapeake Bay. This project entailed detailed interdisciplinary paleoecological and stratigraphic studies during excavation for the Calvert Cliffs Nuclear Power Plant. Funding for this work came from the Ford Foundation and National Geographic Society. From this association with National Geographic Society Whitmore was asked to join the Committee for Research and Exploration, serving as Kellogg's replacement. The committee provides funding for research projects throughout the world. Whitmore later served as vice-chair of the National Geographic Society's Committee for Research and Exploration.

In 1972, Whitmore returned to Alaska, this time to Amchitka Island, where he collected fossils of the historically extinct Steller's sea cow (Hydrodamalis gigas). He and others worked on the rate and mode of Pleistocene uplift of the island, as indicated by beach deposits, which were critical to the prediction of effects by nuclear testing.

Work on Oligocene whales from South Carolina resulted in two publications, one in 1974 and one in 1976. During the 1970s Whitmore was principal investigator on the study of Paleocene vertebrates from Saudi Arabia. Paleoecological studies of this estuarine fauna established the geographical position of part of the ancient Tethys Sea, and contributed to the delineation of lime deposits needed for cement manufacture. Part of Whitmore's duties at the U.S. Geological Survey, involved handling "examination and report" (E & R) requests. Some were submitted by colleagues in other disciplines whose investigations turned up bone specimens. Others came in via USGS public-relations people from citizens who wanted to know about something they found in their backyard or while on vacation. One E & R stood out above all the others, "The Case of the Papal Proboscidean."

Sylvio Bedini, then deputy director of the National Museum of History and Technology (now the National Museum of American History) asked Whitmore to identify, from photographs, some bones dug up during the air-conditioning of the papal apartments in the Vatican. Everyone was puzzled when Whitmore identified at least one bone as that of an elephant. Further research revealed that in 1541, when Pope Leon X had control of the spice trade to the Far East, King Emmanuel the Great of Portugal wanted a share of the action. To get on the good side of the pope, Emmanuel presented him with a young elephant. No elephant had been seen in Rome since the time of Hannibal, and it proved to be a great curiosity—especially as it had been trained to genuflect whenever the pope appeared. It also held water in its trunk and squirted designated victims on the command of its trainer. One day, the elephant's keepers decided they would gild the elephant from head to toe as a surprise for the pope. The surprise was that the gilding killed the elephant. The devastated pope directed the papal painter, who happened to be Raphael, to paint a life-size mural of the elephant; Raphael felt this was beneath him and ordered an apprentice to complete the mural on the palace wall. The elephant was subsequently buried beneath the painting. The mural is now gone but the bones remain.

Whitmore retired from the U.S. Geological Survey in 1984, but he continued his work as a research associate and curator emeritus of the Smithsonian Institution in his old office there until the late 1990s. His later studies included taxonomy and description of fossil Pliocene whales and terrestrial mammals from the Lee Creek phosphate mine at Aurora, North Carolina, and description of Miocene marine mammals from the Pisco Formation of Peru.

== Administrator, manager, service and awards ==
Whitmore was appointed chair of the joint U.S. Geological Survey/Smithsonian Institution committees for the design of new labs and for decisions regarding the paleontology collections. In 1971, he was general chair of the Geological Society of America meetings in Washington, with 4300 people attending. For the American Association for the Advancement of Science and the Mexican Science Council, he chaired a symposium on land connections between North and South America.

The list of institutions and committees that Whitmore served on include the Department of Defense, American Geological Institute, National Research Council and the scientific guidance to the Schoelkopf Geological Museum in Niagara Falls, New York, the Calvert Marine Museum in Solomons, Maryland and to exhibit specialists at the National Museum of Natural History. In 1979 Whitmore served as general chair of the International Centennial Symposium of the U.S. Geological Survey on "Resources for the 21st Century" which brought together were some 500 scientists, corporate executives, and government officials from 48 countries.

Whitmore was a founding member of the Society of Vertebrate Paleontology in 1940; he later served on its executive board and was an honorary life member. Whitmore was the last surviving charter member of the society. Whitmore joined the Paleontological Society of American in 1942. In 1944 he joined the Paleontological Society of Washington, later serving as vice president and president. That same year, he joined the Geological Society of Washington, becoming a councilor, secretary, first vice-president, and then president. In 1945, he helped found the Geological Society of the Philippines.

Whitmore became a fellow of the Geological Society of America in 1947, and served on its Penrose Medal Committee and as its Penrose citationist. Three years later, he became a fellow of the American Association for the Advancement of Science, eventually serving as section secretary and chairman, councilor, and chair of the Newcomb Cleveland Prize Committee.

== Legacy ==
In recognition of Whitmore's contribution to the National Geographic Society and to the marine mammal paleontological community, a publication on marine mammalian paleontology was dedicated to him entitled Contributions in Marine Mammal Paleontology Honoring Frank C. Whitmore, Jr.

In 2002 the Virginia Museum of Natural History awarded Whitmore the Thomas Jefferson Medal for Outstanding Contributions to Natural Science. This award is annually presented to an individual who has consistently made outstanding contributions to natural history. Two fossil cetaceans are named after Whitmore in his honor: the large squalodontid Squalodon whitmorei, and the early toothless mysticete Eomysticetus whitmorei. Whitmore died at age 96 at his home on March 18, 2012.

Expressions of appreciation by young budding scientists who Whitmore mentored can found at webpage http://vmnhpaleontology.wordpress.com/2012/03/20/in-memoriam-frank-whitmore-2/#more-3989. Eshelman and Ward, 1994 include a comprehensive bibliography of Whitmore's scientific papers, reports and book reviews.
