= Suzanne Mahlburg Kay =

American geologist

- Education: University of Illinois Urbana-Champaign; Brown University
- Scientific career
- Workplaces: Cornell University; University of California, Los Angeles

Suzanne Mahlburg Kay (née Mahlburg) is the William & Katherine Snee Professor of Geological Sciences at Cornell University. She studies the origin and evolution of the continental crust. She is a Fellow of the Geological Society of America, the American Geophysical Union and the Mineralogical Society of America.

== Early life and education ==
Kay went to Rockford West High School class of 1965. She received Bachelor of Science in 1969 and a Master of Science in 1972, both in geology from the University of Illinois Urbana-Champaign. She completed her PhD in geology in 1975 at Brown University in mineralogy and petrology. She worked at University of California, Los Angeles as a postdoctoral fellow. Kay joined Cornell University as a postdoctoral researcher in 1976. She was a Fulbright Program Fellow at the University of Buenos Aires in 1989. She was promoted to Associate Professor in 1992 and Professor in 1999.

== Research ==
Kay studies the origin and evolution of the continental crust, looking at how regional tectonics are linked to magmatic processes. She investigates rocks and minerals using neutron activation analysis, inductively coupled plasma mass spectrometry, mass spectrometry and electron microscopes. She focuses on the Andean crust in central and South America. She has looked at the evolution of mid-tertiary magmatic rocks in the Andean subduction zone. She also investigates the Punta Altiplano.

=== Professional service ===
She served as president of the Geological Society of America in 2013 to 2014, and the Mineralogical Society of America Dana Medal Committee between 2013 and 2015. Kay serves on the board of editors of the Journal of South American Earth Sciences. She is on the selection fellows committee of the American Geophysical Union.

=== Awards and honours ===
2023 Penrose Medal by the Geological Society of America]

2015 Member of the National Academy of Sciences of Argentina

2012 University of Illinois Chicago Geology Alumni Achievement Award

2011 Fellow of the American Geophysical Union

2008 Fellow of the Mineralogical Society of America

2007 American Association of Petroleum Geologists Outstanding Educator Award

2000 Geological Society of America Distinguished Service Award

=== Books ===
2009 Backbone of the Americas: Shallow Subduction, Plateau Uplift, and Ridge and Terrane Collision

2008 Field Trip Guides to the Backbone of the Americas in the Southern and Central Andes: Ridge Collision, Shallow Subduction, and Plateau Uplift

2006 Evolution of an Andean Margin: A Tectonic and Magmatic View from the Andes to the Neuquén Basin (35 Degrees-39 Degrees S Lat)

1990 Plutonism from Antarctica to Alaska
