= Kent Condie =

American geologist

Kent Condie (born 28 November 1936) is an American geologist and professor emeritus of Geochemistry at the New Mexico Institute of Mining and Technology. He specializes in the origin and evolution of plate tectonics and the continental crust and pioneered work on 'big data' geochemistry.

Born in Salt Lake City, Utah, he developed an interest in geology while working as a whitewater rafting guide on the Colorado River. He received a B.Sc. and M.Sc. from the University of Utah in 1959 and 1960 respectively. He then received his Ph.D. from the Scripps Institute of Oceanography at the University of California, San Diego in 1965 under the direction of Albert Engel. He has been a professor at New Mexico Tech since 1970.

He has conducted research throughout Africa, Western Australia, Northern Europe, Siberia, and China. His books include the textbook Earth as an Evolving Planetary System.

== Honours ==
- In 1987, he received the Distinguished Research Award from New Mexico Tech.
- In 2007 he was awarded an Honorary Doctorate from the University of Pretoria.
- In 2018 he was awarded the Geological Society of America's Penrose Medal.
