= Susan Kieffer =

American physical geologist and planetary scientist

Susan Elizabeth Werner Kieffer (born November 17, 1942, in Warren, Pennsylvania) is an American physical geologist and planetary scientist. Kieffer is known for her work on the fluid dynamics of volcanoes, geysers, and rivers, and for her model of the thermodynamic properties of complex minerals. She has also contributed to the scientific understanding of meteorite impacts.

== Biography ==
Kieffer received her B.S. in physics/mathematics from Allegheny College in 1964 and is an alumna of the California Institute of Technology receiving both an M.S. (1967) in geological sciences and Ph.D. (1971) in planetary sciences. She received an Honorary Doctor of Science from Allegheny in 1987, and the Distinguished Alumnus Award, equivalent to an honorary Ph.D. from other institutions, from Caltech in 1982.

She is currently an Emeritus Professor of Geology in the Department of Geology at the University of Illinois at Urbana-Champaign. She began her teaching career as a Professor of Geology at the University of California, Los Angeles (1973) before working with the United States Geological Survey in Flagstaff, Arizona (1979–1990). After serving as a Regents Professor of Geology at Arizona State University (1991-1993) she went on to chair the Geological Sciences Department at the University of British Columbia (1993–1995).

She is a member of the National Academy of Sciences of the United States, a fellow of the American Academy of Arts and Sciences, and a member of the Washington State Academy of Sciences. From 1995 to 2000 she held a MacArthur Fellowship. In 2014 She was awarded the Penrose Medal by the Geological Society of America. The American Geosciences Institute recognized Kieffer with the 2017 Marcus Milling Legendary Geoscientist Medal.

In 2013, Kieffer published a trade science book entitled The Dynamics of Disaster. The book discusses natural disasters from an underlying geological perspective.

== Publications ==
=== Impact ===
- Kieffer, S.W., I. Shock Metamorphism of the Coconino Sandstone at Meteor Crater, Arizona: II. The Specific Heat of Solids of Geophysical Interest, Ph.D. Thesis, California Institute of Technology, Pasadena, California, 1970.
- Kieffer, S. W., "Shock metamorphism of the Coconino Sandstone at Meteor Crater," Arizona, Journal of Geophysical Research, 76, 5449–5473, 1971.
- Kieffer, S.W., Introduction to the translation of Russian article by L. Firsov, "Concerning the meteoritic origin of the Puchezh-Katunki Crater," Meteoritics, 8, 223–244, 1973.
- Shoemaker, E. M. and Kieffer, S.W., Guidebook to the Geology of Meteor Crater, Arizona, printed by the Meteoritical Society and the U.S. Geological Survey for the 37th Annual Meeting of the Meteoritical Society, August, 1974.
- Kieffer, S. W., Phakey, P.P., and Christie, J.M., "Microstructural relationships of high-pressure SiO2 phases produced by shock waves in porous quartzite," 8th International Congress of Electron Microscopy, Canberra, Australia, August 1974.
- Kieffer, S. W., "From regolith to rock by shock," The Moon, 13, 301–320, 1975.
- Gibbons, R. V., Kieffer, S. W., Schaal, R. B., and Horz, F., "Experimental calibration of shock metamorphism of basalt," Proc. of Conf. on the Origins of Mare Basalts and their Implications for Lunar Evolution, 17–19 Nov. 1975, Lunar Sci. Inst., Houston, Texas, 44–48.
- Schaal, R., Horz, F., Gibbons, R. V., and Kieffer, S. W., "Impact melts of well characterized lunar and terrestrial basalts," Proc. of Conf. on the Origins of Mare Basalts and their Implications for Lunar Evolution, 17–19 Nov. 1975, Lunar Science Inst., 144–148.
- Maupome, L., Alvarez, R., Kieffer, S. W., and Dietz, R. S., "On the terrestrial origin of the Tepexitl Crater," Mexico, Meteoritics, 10 209–214, 1975.
- Kieffer, S.W., Phakey, P.P., and Christie, J.M., "Shock processes in porous quartzite: transmission electron microscope observations and theory," Contributions to Mineralogy and Petrology, 59, 41–93, 1976.
- Kieffer, S. W., Schaal, R., Gibbons, R., Horz, F., Milton, D.J. and Dube, A., "Shocked basalts from Lonar Impact Crater (India) and experimental analogues," Proceedings, Seventh Lunar Science Conference, 1391–1412, 1976.
- Kerridge, J. F. and Kieffer, S. W., "A constraint on impact theories of chondrule formation," Earth and Planetary Science Letters, 35, 35–42, 1977.
- Kieffer, S. W., "Impact conditions required for formation of melt by jetting in silicates," Impact and Explosion Cratering, edited by D. J. Roddy, R. O. Pepin and R. B. Merrill, Pergamon, 751–769, 1977.
- Croft, S. K., Kieffer, S. W., and Ahrens, T. J., "Low velocity impact craters in ice and permafrost with implications for Martian crater count ages," Journal of Geophysical Research, 84, 8023–8032, 1979.
- Kieffer, S. W. and Simonds, C., "The role of volatiles and lithology in the impact process," Reviews of Geophysics and Space Physics, 18, 143–181, 1980.
- Allen, C. C., Jercinovic, M.C., See, T., Keil, K., Kieffer, S.W.and Simonds, C.H., "Comments on the paper 'Experimental shock lithification of water-bearing rock powders'," Geophysical Research Letters, 9(9), 1013–1016, 1982.
- Simonds, C.H., and Kieffer, Susan W., "Impact and volcanism: A momentum scaling law for erosion," Journal of Geophysical Research, v. 98 (B8), 14, pp. 321–14, 337, 1993.
- Alvarez, Walter, Claeys, Philippe, and Kieffer, Susan W., "Emplacement of KT-Boundary Shocked Quartz from Chicxulub Crater," Science, v. 269, 930–935, 1995.
- Pope, K.O., Kieffer. S.W., and Ames, D.E., "Empirical and theoretical comparisons of the Chicxulub and Sudbury impact structures", Meteoritics and Planetary Science, 39, Nr 1, 97–116, 2004.

=== Multiphase flow ===
- Kieffer, S. W., "Sound speed in liquid-gas mixtures: water-air and water-steam," Journal of Geophysical Research, 82, 2895–2904, 1977.
- Kieffer, S. W. and Delany, J., "Isentropic decompression of fluids from crustal and mantle pressures," Journal of Geophysical Research, 84, 1611–1620, 1979.
- Kieffer, S.W., Brown, K.L., Simmons, S.F., and Watson, A., "Measured fluid flow in an active H2O-CO2 geothermal well as an analog to fluid flow in fractures on Mars: Preliminary report, Lunar and Planetary Science Conference," #1856, 2004, 2 pages.

=== Planetary volcanology ===
- Zirin, H. and Werner (Kieffer), S., "Detailed analysis of flares, magnetic fields and activity in the sunspot group of September 13–26, 1963," Solar Physics, 1, 66–100, 1967.
- Kieffer, S. W., "Droplet chondrules," Science, 189, 330–340, 1975.
- Kieffer, S. W., "From regolith to rock by shock," The Moon, 13, 301–320, 1975.
- Smith, B. A., Shoemaker, E.M., Kieffer, S.W., and Cook, A.F., "The role of SO2 in volcanism on Io," Nature, 280, 738, 1979.
- Croft, S. K., Kieffer, S. W., and Ahrens, T. J., "Low velocity impact craters in ice and permafrost with implications for Martian crater count ages," Journal of Geophysical Research, 84, 8023–8032, 1979.
- Kieffer, S. W., "Fluid dynamics and thermodynamics of Ionian volcanism," Chapter 18 in The Satellites of Jupiter, ed. D. Morrison, 647–723, 1982.
- Kieffer, S. W., "Volcanoes and atmospheres," The Planetary Report, vol. V(1), 4–6, 1985. Reprinted as Kieffer, S.W., "Volcanoes and Atmospheres: Catastrophic Influences on the Planets, Earthquakes and Volcanoes," 18 (2), 76–83, 1986. Translated into Welsh as "Y Llosgfynydd a'r Awyrgylch-Dylanwadau trychinebus ar blanedau," in Y Gwyddonydd, CCBII, 125–127, 1990.
- Soderblom, L.A., Becker, T.L., Brown, R.H., Cook II, A.F., Hansen, C.J., Kirk, R.L., Kieffer, S.W., Shoemaker, E.M. and Johnson, T., "Triton's geyser-like plumes: discovery and basic characterization," Science, v. 250, pp. 410–415, 1990.
- Kirk, R.L., Soderblom, L.A., Brown, R.H., Kieffer, Susan W., and Kargel, J.S., "Triton's eruptive plumes: discovery, characteristics, and models," in Neptune and Triton, ed. D. Cruikshank, University of Arizona Press, 949–989, 1995.
- Kieffer, S.W., "Numerical models of caldera-scale volcanism on Earth, Venus, and Mars," Science, (invited article), v. 269, 1385–1391, 1995.
- McEwen, Alfred S., Lopes-Gautier, Rosaly, Kesztheilyi, Laszlo, and Kieffer, Susan W., "Extreme Volcanism on Jupiter's Moon Io," Chapter 7 in Environmental Effects of Volcanic Eruptions: From Deep Oceans to Deep Space, edited by T. Gregg and J. Zimbelman, Kluwer Academic Publishers, Dordrecht, Netherlands.
- Kieffer, S.W., Rosaly Lopes-Gautier, Alfred McEwen, William Smythe, Laszlo Keszthelyi, Robert Carlson, "Prometheus, Io's Wandering Plume," Science, 288, June 19, 2000, pp. 1204–1207.
- Rosaly M.C. Lopes, L.W. Kamp, S. Doute, W.D. Smythe, R.W. Carlson, A.S. McEwen, P.E. Geissler, S.W. Kieffer, F.E. Leader, A.G. Davies, E. Barbinis, R. Mehlman, M. Segura, J. Shirley, L.A. Soderblom, "Io in the Near-Infrared: NIMS results from the Galileo Fly-Bys in 1999 and 2000," J. Geop. Res., 106, no. E12, pp 33, 53–78, 2001.
- Battaglia, Steven M., Stewart, Michael A., Kieffer, Susan W., "Io's theothermal (sulfur) - Lithosphere cycle inferred from a sulfur solubility model of Pele's magma supply," "Icarus", 235, 123–129, 2014.

=== Rivers ===
- Kieffer, S.W., "The 1983 hydraulic jump in Crystal Rapids: implications for river-running and geomorphic evolution in the Grand Canyon," Journal of Geology, 93(4), 385–406, 1985.
- Kieffer, S.W., "Hydraulics of the Rapids of the Colorado River, Grand Canyon, Arizona," a 20-minute video, U.S. Geological Survey Open File Report 86–503, 1986.
- Kieffer, S.W., Hydraulic map of House Rock Rapids, Grand Canyon, Arizona, U.S. Geological Survey Miscellaneous Investigations Map 1897, part A. Map size = 42"x 58", 1988.
- Kieffer, S.W., Hydraulic map of Lava Falls Rapids, Grand Canyon, Arizona, U.S. Geological Survey Miscellaneous Investigations Map 1897, part J, Map size = 42"x 58", 1988.
- Kieffer, S.W., Hydraulic map of Hance Rapids, Grand Canyon, Arizona, U.S. Geological Survey Miscellaneous Investigations Map 1897, part C, Map size = 42"x 58", 1988.
- Kieffer, S.W., Hydraulic map of Horn Creek Rapids, Grand Canyon, Arizona, U.S. Geological Survey Miscellaneous Investigations Map 1897, part E Map size = 42"x 58", 1988.
- Kieffer, S.W., Hydraulic map of Crystal Rapids, Grand Canyon, Arizona, U.S. Geological Survey Miscellaneous Investigations Map 1897, part H Map size = 42"x 58", 1988.
- Kieffer, S.W., "The rapids and waves of the Colorado River, Grand Canyon, Arizona," U.S. Geological Survey Open-file Report 87–96, 106 pp., 1987.
- Kieffer, S.W., "Geologic Nozzles," Reviews of Geophysics, 27(1), pp. 3–38, 1989.
- Kieffer, S.W., Graf, Julia B., and Schmidt, John C., "Hydraulics and sediment transport of the Colorado River," pp. 48–66 in Geology of Grand Canyon, Northern Arizona (with Colorado River Guides), ed. D.P. Elston, G.H Billingsley, and R.A. Young, Field Trip Guidebook T115/T315, American Geo-physical Union Publication for the 28th International Geological Congress, Washington, D.C., 1989.
- Graf, Julia B., Schmidt, John C., and Kieffer, S.W., "River log of the hydraulic characteristics of the Colorado River and selected rapids," pp. 37–47, in Geology of Grand Canyon, Northern Arizona (with Colorado River Guides), ed. D.P. Elston, G.H. Billingsley, and R.A. Young, Field Trip Guidebook T115/T315, American Geophysical Union Publication for the 28th International Geological Congress, Washington, D.C., 1989.
- Kieffer, S.W., Hydraulic map of Deubendorff Rapids, Grand Canyon, Arizona, U.S. Geological Survey Miscellaneous Investigations Map 1897, part I. Map size = 42" x 58", 1988.
- Kieffer, S.W., Hydraulic map of Bright Angel Rapids, Grand Canyon, Arizona, U.S.Geological Survey Miscellaneous Investigations Map I-1897-D, 1988 (this map bears a 1988 date, but publication was in 1989).
- Kieffer, S.W., Hydraulic map of Hermit Rapids, Grand Canyon, Arizona, U.S. Geological Survey Miscellaneous Investigations Map I-1897-G, 1988 (this map bears a 1988 date, but publication was in 1989).
- Kieffer, S.W., Hydraulic map of 24.5 Mile Rapids, Grand Canyon, Arizona, U.S. Geological Survey Miscellaneous Investigations Map I-1897-B, 1988 (this map bears a 1988 date, but publication was in 1989).
- Kieffer, S.W., "The hydraulics and geomorphology of the Colorado River in the Grand Canyon," Chapter 16 in Grand Canyon Geology, edited by S.S. Beus and M. Morales, pp. 333–383, 1990.
- Levine, Alan H. and Kieffer, Susan W., "A hydraulic model for the August 7, 1980 pyroclastic flow at Mount St. Helens, Washington," Geology, v. 19, p. 1121–1124, November, 1991.

=== Terrestrial volcanology and geysers ===
- Kieffer, S. W., "Sound speed in liquid-gas mixtures: water-air and water-steam," Journal of Geophysical Research, 82, 2895–2904, 1977.
- Kieffer, S. W., "Blast dynamics at Mount St. Helens on 18 May 1980," Nature, 291, 568–570, 1981.
- Kieffer, S.W., "The blast at Mount St. Helens: What happened?", Engineering and Science (alumni magazine published by Calif. Inst. of Technology), v. XLV(1), 6–12, 1981.
- Kieffer, S. W., "Fluid dynamics of the May 18 Blast at Mount St. Helens," U.S.G.S. Prof. Paper 1250, 379–400, 1982.
- Kieffer, S. W., "Fluid dynamics and thermodynamics of Ionian volcanism," Chapter 18 in The Satellites of Jupiter, ed. D. Morrison, 647–723, 1982.
- Sturtevant, B. and Kieffer, S.W., "Vapor explosions and the blast at Mount St. Helens," Proceedings of 14th International Symposium on Shock Tubes and Waves, 14–17 August 1983, Sidney, N.S.W., Australia, 9 pages.
- Kieffer, S. W., "Factors governing the structure of volcanic jets," in Explosive Volcanism; Inception, Evolution, and Hazards, report of the National Academy of Sciences, Geophysics Study Committee, Chapter 11 ed. F. M. Boyd, 143–157, 1984.
- Kieffer, S. W., "Seismicity at Old Faithful Geyser; an isolated source of geothermal noise and possible analogue of volcanic seismicity," Journal of Volcanology and Geothermal Research, 22, 59–95, 1984.
- Kieffer, S. W. and Sturtevant, B., "Laboratory studies of volcanic jets," Journal of Geophysical Research, 89, 8253–8268, 1984.
- Kieffer, S. W., "Volcanoes and atmospheres," The Planetary Report, vol. V(1), 4–6, 1985. Reprinted as Kieffer, S.W., "Volcanoes and Atmospheres: Catastrophic Influences on the Planets, Earthquakes and Volcanoes," 18 (2), 76–83, 1986. Translated into Welsh as "Y Llosgfynydd a'r Awyrgylch-Dylanwadau trychinebus ar blanedau," in Y Gwyddonydd, CCBII, 125–127, 1990.
- Kieffer, S.W., "Geologic Nozzles," in Lecture Notes in Physics, Perspectives in Fluid Mechanics, 320, ed. Donald Coles, Springer-Verlag, Berlin, 1985, pp. 143–207.
- Kieffer, S.W., and B. Sturtevant, "Erosional furrows formed during the lateral blast at Mount St. Helens, May 18, 1980," J. Geophysical Res., 93, 14, pp. 793–14, 816, 1988
- Kieffer, S.W., "Geologic Nozzles," Reviews of Geophysics, 27(1), pp. 3–38, 1989.
- Kieffer, Susan Werner, "Multiphase flow in explosive volcanic and geothermal eruptions," Theoretical and Applied Mechanics, Proceedings of the XVIIth International Congress of Theoretical and Applied Mechanics, Grenoble, France, 21–27 Aug., 1988, Editors P. Germain, M. Piau and D. Caillerie, pp. 145–171, Elsevier, Amsterdam, Netherlands, 1988.
- Soderblom, L.A., Becker, T.L., Brown, R.H., Cook II, A.F., Hansen, C.J., Kirk, R.L., Kieffer, S.W., Shoemaker, E.M. and Johnson, T., "Triton's geyser-like plumes: discovery and basic characterization," Science, v. 250, pp. 410–415, 1990.
- Levine, Alan H. and Kieffer, Susan W., "A hydraulic model for the August 7, 1980 pyroclastic flow at Mount St. Helens, Washington," Geology, v. 19, pp. 1121–1124, November, 1991.
- Valentine, G.A., Wohletz, K.H., and Kieffer, Susan W., "Effects of topography on facies and compositional zonation in caldera-related ignimbrites," Bulletin of the Geological Society of America, v. 104(2), pp. 154–165, 1992.
- Valentine, G.A., Wohletz, K.H., and Kieffer, Susan W., Video cassette of results from Cray simulations of central vent caldera eruptions, a 20-minute color video distributed by Los Alamos National Laboratory, 1990.
- Valentine, Greg A., Wohletz, Kenneth H., and Kieffer, Susan W., "Sources of unsteady column dynamics in pyroclastic flow eruptions," Journal of Geophysical Research, v. 96 (B13) pp. 21, 887–21, 892, 1991.
- Simonds, C.H., and Kieffer, Susan W., "Impact and volcanism: A momentum scaling law for erosion," Journal of Geophysical Research, v. 98 (B8), 14, pp. 321–14, 337, 1993.
- Fink, J.F., and Kieffer, Susan W., "Pyroclastic flows generated by lava dome collapse," Nature, v. 363, 612–615, June, 1993.
- Kieffer, Susan W., and Morrissey, M.M., "Exploring Earth with New Data and New Tools," Geotimes, v. 38(6), 15–17, June, 1993.
- Kirk, R.L., Soderblom, L.A., Brown, R.H., Kieffer, Susan W., and Kargel, J.S., "Triton's eruptive plumes: discovery, characteristics, and models," in Neptune and Triton, ed. D. Cruikshank, University of Arizona Press, 949–989, 1995.
- Westphal, J.A., Kieffer, S.W., and Hutchinson, R.A, "Journey Toward the Center of the Earth," a 20-minute narrated video of the descent of a video into the conduit of Old Faithful geyser, not a formal publication, but a very public work on view at the Old Faithful Visitors Center, Yellowstone National Park, 1994.
- Kieffer, S.W., Westphal, J.A., and Hutchinson, R.A., "Journey Toward the Center of the Earth," Yellowstone Science, v. 3(3), 1995.
- Kieffer, S.W., "Numerical models of caldera-scale volcanism on Earth, Venus, and Mars," Science, (invited article), v. 269, 1385–1391, 1995.
- Hutchinson, R.A., Westphal, J.A., and Kieffer, S.W., "In situ observations of Old Faithful Geyser," Geology, v. 25, 875–878, 1997.
- Kieffer, S.W., Rosaly Lopes-Gautier, Alfred McEwen, William Smythe, Laszlo Keszthelyi, Robert Carlson, "Prometheus, Io's Wandering Plume," Science, 288, June 19, 2000, pp. 1204–1207.
- Chakraborty, P., Gioia, G., and Kieffer, S.W., Volcan Reventador's unusual umbrella, Geophys. Res. Letters, 33, L05313, 5 pages, doi:10.1029/2005GL024915, 2006.
- Kieffer, S.W., Brown, K.L., Simmons, S.F., and Watson, A., "Measured fluid flow in an active H2O-CO2 geothermal well as an analog to fluid flow in fractures on Mars": Preliminary report, Lunar and Planetary Science Conference, #1856, 2004, 2 pages.

=== Thermodynamics ===
- Kieffer, S.W., I. Shock Metamorphism of the Coconino Sandstone at Meteor Crater, Arizona: II. The Specific Heat of Solids of Geophysical Interest, Ph.D. Thesis, California Institute of Technology, Pasadena, California, 1970.
- Kieffer, S. W., Getting, I.C., and Kennedy, G.C., "Experimental determination of the pressure dependence of the thermal diffusivity of teflon, sodium chloride, quartz and silica," Journal of Geophysical Research, 81, 3025–3030, 1975.
- Kieffer, S. W., "Lattice thermal conductivity within the earth and considerations of a relationship between the pressure dependence of the thermal diffusivity and the volume dependence of the Gruneisen Parameter," Journal of Geophysical Research, 81, 3018–3024, 1976.
- Kieffer, S. W., "Sound speed in liquid-gas mixtures: water-air and water-steam," Journal of Geophysical Research, 82, 2895–2904, 1977.
- Kieffer, S. W., "Thermodynamic and lattice vibrations of minerals: 1. mineral heat capacities and their relationships to simple lattice vibrational models," Reviews of Geophysics, 17, 1–19, 1979.
- Kieffer, S. W., "Thermodynamics and lattice vibrations of minerals: 2. vibrational characteristics of silicates," Reviews of Geophysics, 17, 20–34, 1979.
- Kieffer, S. W., "Thermodynamics and lattice vibrations of minerals: 3. lattice dynamics and an approximation for minerals with application to simple substances and framework silicates," Reviews of Geophysics, 17, 35–59, 1979.
- Kieffer, S. W. and Delany, J., "Isentropic decompression of fluids from crustal and mantle pressures," Journal of Geophysical Research, 84, 1611–1620, 1979.
- Kieffer, S. W., "Thermodynamics and lattice vibrations of minerals: 4. application to chain, sheet and orthosilicates," Reviews of Geophysics and Space Physics, 18, 862–886, 1980.
- Kieffer, S. W., "Acceptance of the Mineralogical Society of America Award for 1980," Amer. Mineral, 66, 644–645, 1981.
- Kieffer, S. W., "Thermodynamics and lattice vibrations of minerals: 5. applications to phase equilibria, isotopic fractionation, and high-pressure thermodynamic properties," Reviews of Geophysics and Space Physics, 20(4), 827–849, 1982.
- Kieffer, S. W. and Navrotsky, A., editors, "Microscopic to Macroscopic Atomic Environments to Mineral Thermodynamics," Reviews of Mineralogy, 14, 428 pp., 1985.
- Kieffer, S. W., "Heat capacity and entropy: systematic relations to lattice vibrations," Reviews of Mineralogy, 14, 65–126, 1985.
- Kieffer, S. W., "Scientific perspective [on Microscopic to Macroscopic: Atomic environments to Mineral Thermodynamics]", Reviews of Mineralogy, 14, 1–8, 1985.
- Kieffer, S. W., "FORTRAN program for calculation of thermodynamic properties of minerals from vibrational spectra," U.S. Geological Survey Open File Report 86-475, 47 pages, 1986.
- McMillan, P.F., Lazarev, A.N., and Kieffer, S.W., "Lattice dynamics and force fields in crystals," Chapter 6.5.1 in Advanced Mineralogy, Volume 2: Methods and Instrumentations: Results and Recent Developments, edited by A.S. Marfunin, published by Springer Verlag, Berlin, submitted December 10, 1990, p. 412–?, published 1993?? (can't read date)
- Lazarev, A.N., McMillan, P.F., and Kieffer, S.W., "Band assignments in infrared and Raman spectroscopy," Chapter 3.6.1 in Advanced Mineralogy, Volume 2: Methods and Instrumentations: Results and Recent Developments, edited by A.S. Marfunin, published by Springer Verlag, Berlin, submitted December 10, 1990, p. 174–?, published 1993?? (can't read date)
- Agoshkov, V.M., Kieffer, S.W., and McMillan, P.F., "Lattice dynamics and thermodynamic properties of minerals," Chapter 6.5.2 in Advanced Mineralogy, Volume 2: Methods and Instrumentations: Results and Recent Developments, edited by A.S. Marfunin, published by Springer Verlag, Berlin, submitted December 10, 1990, p. 419?, published 1993?? (can't read date)
- Clayton, Robert N. and Kieffer, Susan W., "Oxygen isotopic thermometer calibrations," in Stable Isotope Geochemistry, Special Publication No. 3 of The Geochemical Society, Edited by H.P. Taylor Jr., J.R. O'Neil, and I.R. Kaplan, pp. 3–10, 1991.

=== Education, sustainability, and miscellaneous ===
- Kieffer, Susan W., Haas, Nancy, and Woods, Cyndy, "'Scientist Sue': Changing the Way At-Risk Adolescents View Science," reviewed paper for presentation and dissemination at American Education Research Association, April 19–23, 1999, Montreal, 4 pp.
- Kieffer, Susan W., "Geology, The Bifocal Science," in The Earth Around Us: Maintaining a Livable Planet, ed. by Jill Schneiderman, Chapter 1, pp. 2–17, Freeman Press, April 2000.
- Review of the AECL Environmental Impact Statement on the Concept for Disposal of Canada's Nuclear Fuel Waste, prepared by the "GAND" Committee (The Geoscience Aspects of Nuclear Fuel Waste Disposal), chaired by S.W. Kieffer, August 8, 1995. Not peer reviewed except by the other four committee members. Submitted to the Panel deciding on the future direction of the Concept, 36 pp.
- Zen, E-an, P.B. Barton Jr., P.H. Reitan, S.W. Kieffer, and A.R. Palmer, Earth Resources: The Little Engine that Could Brake Sustainability, published on the Boulder Community Network site, http://bcn.boulder.co.us/basin/local/sustain_update.html; also submitted to New Scientist, 10/01.
- Kieffer, Susan W., "The concepts of beauty and creativity: Earth science thinking," in Geol. Soc. America Special Paper 413, ed. Manduca, C.A., and Mogk, D.W., Earth and Mind: How Geologists Think and Learn about the Earth, p. 3–11, doi: 10.1130/2006.2413(01), 2006.
