= Ian Dalziel (geologist) =

Scottish geologist and geophysicist

Ian W.D. Dalziel
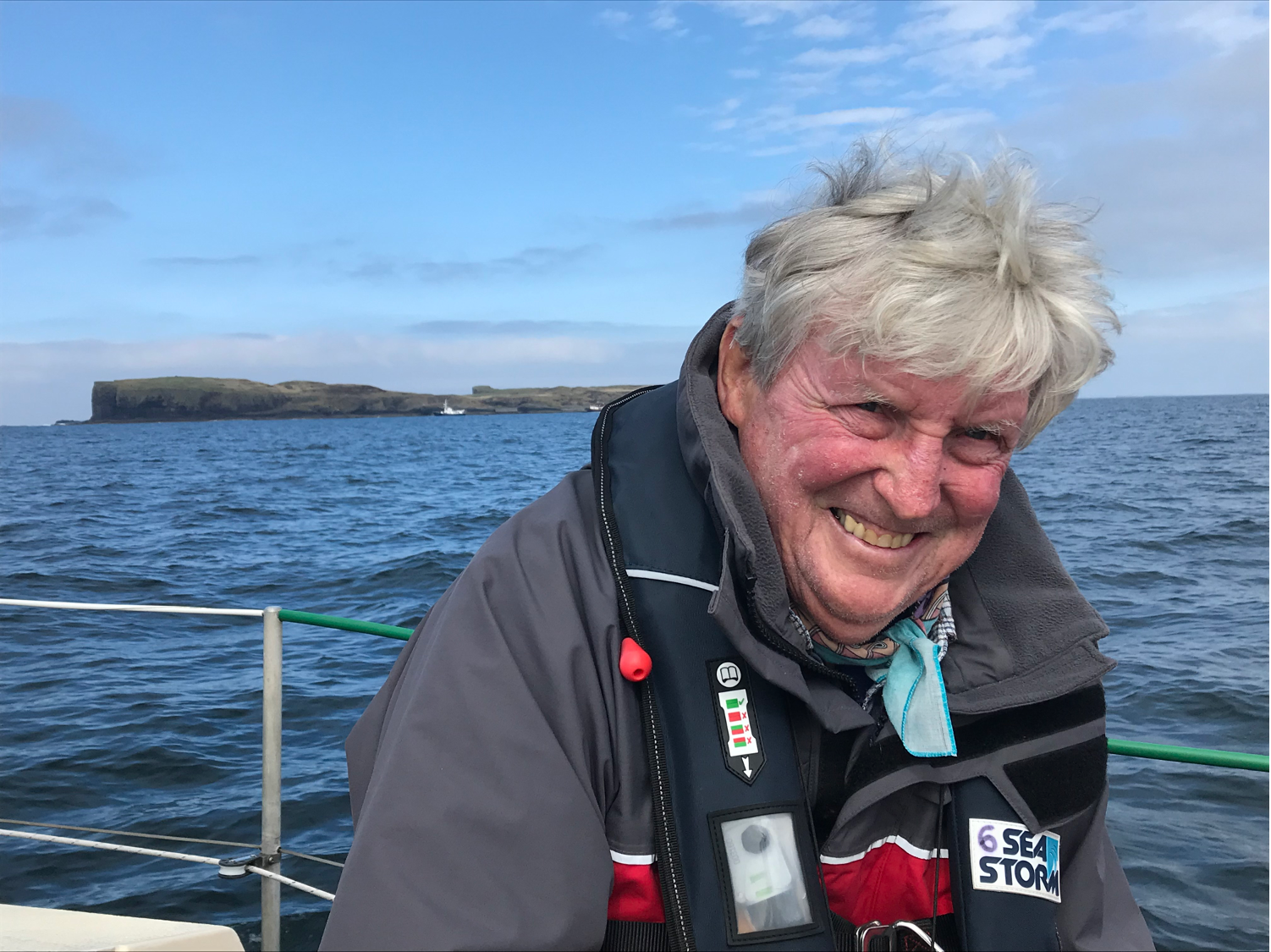
- Ian Dalziel at South Georgia Island in 2008. Photo courtesy Jackson School of Geosciences
- Born: 26 November 1937 (age 88); Glasgow, Scotland
- Education: University of Edinburgh
- Awards: Murchison Medal (1992); Bownocker Medal (1997); Clough Medal (2003); Honorary Fellow of the Geological Society (2005); Penrose Medal (2021)
- Scientific career
- Fields: Geophysics field geology plate tectonics
- Workplaces: University of Texas; Columbia University; University of Wisconsin; University of Edinburgh
- Thesis: A Structural Study of the Granite Gneiss of Western Ardgour (1963)

Ian Dalziel is a Scottish geologist who pioneered the study of pre-Pangaea plate tectonics and the theory of supercontinent cycles on Earth. In particular, he is known for geologic fieldwork in the southern Andes, the Scotia Arc, South Georgia and Antarctica. His discoveries include evidence for the timing of the separation of South America from Antarctica and the beginning of the Antarctic Circumpolar Current.

In 2021, Dalziel was awarded the Penrose Medal by the Geological Society of America. In 2023, Dalziel was awarded the Polar Medal by the U.K. and Commonwealth government.

== Biography ==
=== Early life ===
Ian Dalziel was born 26 November 1937, in Glasgow, Scotland where he lived with his actor parents before moving to the University of Edinburgh, where he earned a B.Sc. in geology with physics, and later a Ph.D. in geology (1963). As a child, Dalziel gained an early appreciation for geology and remote places while on holiday in the highlands and islands of Scotland with his parents. He is married and has two children.

=== Academic career ===
After a short stint lecturing geology at University of Edinburgh, Dalziel moved to the U.S. to join the University of Wisconsin as an assistant professor of Geology in 1963. Just a few years later, in 1967, he joined Columbia University as an associate professor and later a senior research scientist at Columbia University's Lamont-Doherty Geological Observatory (now the Lamont–Doherty Earth Observatory). In 1985, he moved to Austin, Texas and joined the University of Texas at Austin Institute for Geophysics, where he is now a research professor.

== Recognition ==
Dalziel is the recipient of several honors, including an Honorary Fellowship and the Murchison Medal (1992) by The Geological Society, the Clough Medal by the Edinburgh Geological Society in 2003 and a fellowship from the John Simon Guggenheim Memorial Foundation in 1976.

In 2021, Dalziel was awarded the Penrose Medal by the Geological Society of America for pioneering discoveries about Earth's ancient geography and its past supercontinents. The Penrose Medal is considered the highest honor to be awarded within the field of geology. At the award ceremony, Dalziel was recognized as "one of the great field-based geologists of our generation" and "one of the world’s leading geologists."

In 2023, Dalziel was awarded the Polar Medal by the U.K. and Commonwealth government, for contributions to Antarctic geology, including discoveries about its ancient past and the fragility of the ice sheet.
