= George Plafker =

American geologist and seismologist (1929–2026)

- Born: March 6, 1929; Upland, Pennsylvania, U.S.
- Died: April 2, 2026 (aged 97)
- Education: Brooklyn College; University of California, Berkeley; Stanford University
- Awards: Penrose Medal
- Scientific career
- Fields: Geology, Seismology
- Workplaces: U.S. Army Corps of Engineers; United States Geological Survey; Chevron Corporation

George Plafker (March 6, 1929 – April 2, 2026) was an American geologist and seismologist who made significant contributions to both fields, with research focused on subduction, tsunami, and the geology of Alaska. Following prolonged study of the region of the 1964 Alaska earthquake, Plafker correctly concluded that the largest earthquakes are the result of fault slip at convergent boundaries. This was at a time when the theory of plate tectonics was still not completely accepted by the scientific community. Additional studies were done in Chile in the late 1960s regarding the series of earthquakes there.

Plafker died on April 2, 2026, at the age of 97.

== Awards ==
For his groundbreaking research, Plafker was honored with the Penrose Medal by the Geological Society of America and the Harry Fielding Reid Medal from the Seismological Society of America, both in 2017.
