= List of Penrose Medal winners =

The Penrose Medal was created in 1925 by R.A.F. Penrose, Jr., as the top prize awarded by the Geological Society of America. Originally created as the Geological Society of America Medal it was soon renamed the Penrose Medal by popular assent of the society's membership, and was first awarded in 1927. It is awarded only at the discretion of the GSA council, "in recognition of eminent research in pure geology, for outstanding original contributions or achievements that mark a major advance in the science of geology."

== Award winners ==
- 2026 Frank S. Spear
- 2025 Thure E. Cerling
- 2024 Andrew H. Knoll
- 2023 Suzanne Mahlburg Kay
- 2022 An Yin
- 2021 Ian Dalziel
- 2020 James G. Moore
- 2019 Tanya Atwater
- 2018 Kent Condie
- 2017 George Plafker
- 2016 John T. Andrews
- 2015 James W. Head
- 2014 Susan W. Kieffer
- 2013 Steven M. Stanley
- 2012 Raymond A. Price
- 2011 Paul F. Hoffman
- 2010 Eric J. Essene
- 2009 B. Clark Burchfiel
- 2008 George A. Thompson
- 2007 Kevin C. A. Burke
- 2006 Robert D. Hatcher
- 2005 Minze Stuiver
- 2004 W. Gary Ernst
- 2003 Peter R. Vail
- 2002 Walter Alvarez
- 2001 Kenneth Jinghwa Hsu
- 2000 Robert L. Folk
- 1999 M. Gordon Wolman
- 1998 Jack E. Oliver
- 1997 John D. Bredehoeft
- 1996 John R. L. Allen
- 1995 John C. Crowell
- 1994 Luna B. Leopold
- 1993 Alfred G. Fischer
- 1992 John Frederick Dewey
- 1991 William R. Dickinson
- 1990 Norman D. Newell
- 1989 Warren B. Hamilton
- 1988 Robert S. Dietz
- 1987 Marland P. Billings
- 1986 Laurence L. Sloss
- 1985 Rudolf Trümpy
- 1984 Donald E. White
- 1983 G. Arthur Cooper
- 1982 Aaron C. Waters
- 1981 John Rodgers
- 1980 Hollis Dow Hedberg
- 1979 J Harlen Bretz
- 1978 Robert M. Garrels
- 1977 Robert P. Sharp
- 1976 Preston Cloud
- 1975 Francis J. Pettijohn
- 1974 William Maurice Ewing
- 1973 M. King Hubbert
- 1972 Wilmot H. Bradley
- 1971 Marshall Kay
- 1970 Ralph Alger Bagnold
- 1969 Francis Birch
- 1968 J. Tuzo Wilson
- 1967 Herbert Harold Read
- 1966 Harry H. Hess
- 1965 Philip Burke King
- 1964 Donnel Foster Hewett
- 1963 William Walden Rubey
- 1962 Alfred Sherwood Romer
- 1961 Philip Henry Kuenen
- 1960 Walter Hermann Bucher
- 1959 Adolph Knopf
- 1958 James Gilluly
- 1957 Bruno Sander
- 1956 Arthur Holmes
- 1955 Maurice Gignoux
- 1954 Arthur Francis Buddington
- 1953 Esper S. Larsen, Jr.
- 1952 George Gaylord Simpson
- 1951 Pentti Eskola
- 1950 Morley E. Wilson
- 1949 Wendell P. Woodring
- 1948 Hans Cloos
- 1947 Arthur Louis Day
- 1946 T. Wayland Vaughan
- 1945 Felix Andries Vening Meinesz
- 1944 Bailey Willis
- 1943 No award given
- 1942 Charles Kenneth Leith
- 1941 Norman Levi Bowen
- 1940 Nelson Horatio Darton
- 1939 William Berryman Scott
- 1938 Andrew Cowper Lawson
- 1937 No award given
- 1936 Arthur Philemon Coleman
- 1935 Reginald Aldworth Daly
- 1934 Charles Schuchert
- 1933 Waldemar Lindgren
- 1932 Edward Oscar Ulrich
- 1931 William Morris Davis
- 1930 François Alfred Antoine Lacroix
- 1929 No award given
- 1928 Jakob Johannes Sederholm
- 1927 Thomas Chrowder Chamberlin

Source: GSA

== See also ==
- Category:Penrose Medal winners
- List of geology awards
- Prizes named after people
