= Radiocarbon (journal) =

Academic journal about radiocarbon dating

- Discipline: Radiocarbon dating
- Language: English

Publication details
- History: 1959–present
- Publisher: Cambridge University Press for the University of Arizona (United States)
- Frequency: Bimonthly

Standard abbreviations
- ISO 4: Radiocarbon

Indexing
- CODEN: RACAAT
- ISSN: 0033-8222 (print); 1945-5755 (web)
- LCCN: 75648871
- OCLC no.: 02244603

Links
- Journal homepage

Radiocarbon is a scientific journal devoted to the topic of radiocarbon dating.

It was founded in 1959 as a supplement to the American Journal of Science, and is an important source of data and information about radiocarbon dating. It publishes many radiocarbon results, and since 1979 it has published the proceedings of the international conferences on radiocarbon dating. The journal is published six times per year. As of 2016, it is published by Cambridge University Press.

== See also ==
- Carbon-14
