= Dwight Crandell =

American volcanologist

Dwight Raymond "Rocky" Crandell (25 January 1923 – April 6, 2009) was an American volcanologist who alongside Donal R. Mullineaux correctly predicted that Mount St. Helens would erupt before the end of the 20th century.

== Early life and education ==
Born in Galesburg, Illinois, Crandell fought in World War II as a lieutenant in an Army mortar platoon. Once the war had finished he returned to America and earned a doctorate from Yale.

== Career at USGS ==
He was placed at the USGS office in Colorado where he met Donal R. Mullineaux with whom he began to work on the theory that Mount St. Helens will erupt, before the end of the century.

=== Mount Rainier ===
They proved that about 5,600 years earlier, the summit of Mount Rainier had collapsed and caused a landslide filling some valleys up to 400 feet deep. That awakened the recognition that a similar event could endanger hundreds of thousands of people living atop the ancient mudflows.

=== Mount St. Helens ===
Their 1978 report claimed that Mount St. Helens is “an especially dangerous volcano” and it would more than likely erupt before the end of the 20th century.

On May 18, 1980 their predictions came true when the volcano erupted killing 57 people and caused more than $1 billion worth of damage. He retired shortly after the eruption.

== Later life ==
Crandell died in a hospice in Colorado on April 6, 2009 after suffering a heart attack. He was survived by his two daughters, three grandchildren, and one great-grandchild. His wife died in 2006 and her ashes were scattered at Mount Rainier where he had worked many years before. A son predeceased both parents in 1965.
