= Harry Fielding Reid Medal =

Annual award

The Harry Fielding Reid Medal is the senior medal of the Seismological Society of America. It is named for Harry Fielding Reid (1859–1944), an American geophysicist, who worked on earthquakes and seismology and originated the concept of elastic rebound to explain how stored energy is released in earthquakes. It was originally called The Society Medal, and is awarded annually for outstanding contributions in seismology or earthquake engineering.

== Medallists ==
- 2026: Peter M. Shearer
- 2025: Charles A. Langston
- 2024: Norman A. Abrahamson
- 2023: Brian Kennett
- 2021: William Ellsworth
- 2020: Gail Atkinson
- 2019: Karen M. Fischer
- 2018: David M. Boore
- 2017: George Plafker
- 2016: Lev P. Vinnik
- 2015: Christopher H. Scholz
- 2014: Thorne Lay
- 2013: Kerry Sieh
- 2012: James R. Rice
- 2011: Barbara Romanowicz
- 2010: Tatyana G. Rautian
- 2009 Paul G. Richards
- 2008: Ralph Joseph Archuleta
- 2007: Francis Anthony Dahlen
- 2006: Nafi Toksöz
- 2005: Nicholas Ambraseys
- 2004: James Freeman Gilbert
- 2003: Raul Madariaga
- 2002: Donald V. Helmberger
- 2001: C. Allin Cornell
- 2000: E. R. (Bob) Engdahl
- 1999: Adam Dziewonski
- 1998: James C. Savage
- 1997: Lynn Sykes
- 1996: James N. Brune
- 1995: Clarence R. Allen
- 1994: Karl V. Steinbrugge
- 1991: Hiroo Kanamori
- 1989: Leon Knopoff
- 1988: Robert E. Wallace
- 1987: Otto W. Nuttli
- 1986: Keiiti Aki
- 1985: John A. Blume
- 1983: Jack E. Oliver
- 1982: Frank Press
- 1981: George W. Housner
- 1980: Kiyoo Wadati
- 1979: Harold Jeffreys
- 1978: Inge Lehmann
- 1977: Charles Richter
- 1976: Perry Byerly

== See also ==
- List of geophysicists
- List of geophysics awards
- List of earth sciences awards
- List of prizes named after people
