= Byerly =

Byerly is a surname. Notable people with the surname include:

- Alice Sudduth Byerly (1855–1904), temperance activist
- Alison Byerly (born 1961), American educator
- Bud Byerly (1920–2012), American baseball player
- Chester Byerly (1918–1984), American politician
- Hayden Byerly (born 2000), American child actor
- Kathleen Byerly (1944–2020), United States Navy officer
- Perry Byerly (1897–1978), American seismologist
- Robert Byerly (1916–1945), American-born Canadian soldier who was a spy for the British SOE during World War II

== See also ==
- Byerley
- Mount Byerly, Antarctic mountain named for Perry Byerly
- Byerly House, historic house in Pennsylvania, United States
