= Karen M. Fischer =

American seismologist

- Born: Boston, MA
- Education: Massachusetts Institute of Technology, Yale University
- Scientific career
- Workplaces: Brown University
- Thesis: The morphology and dynamics of subducting lithosphere (1989)
- Doctoral advisor: Thomas H. Jordan

Karen Fischer is an American seismologist known for her research on the structure of Earth's mantle, in particular its lithosphere and asthenosphere.

== Education and career ==
Fischer has a B.S. in geology and geophysics from Yale University (1983). While an undergraduate, Fischer had summer research experiences at Yale University and Lamont–Doherty Geological Observatory. In 1989, she earned a Ph.D. in geophysics from the Massachusetts Institute of Technology (1989) with a dissertation titled "The morphology and dynamics of subducting lithosphere". After a postdoctoral fellowship at Lamont–Doherty Earth Observatory of Columbia University (1989-1990), she joined the faculty at Brown University where she is the Louis and Elizabeth Scherck Distinguished Professor of Geological Sciences.

== Research ==
Fischer's research uses seismology to study the interior of Earth's crust and mantle, especially in the lithosphere and the asthenosphere. In her early work, Fischer identified unusually high temperatures in the lithosphere of the Marquesas Islands in the Pacific Ocean, and she used seismic data to map depth variations in the thickness of the subducting lithosphere in the Tonga subduction zone to gain insight on its dynamics. A key theme of her research is using seismic wave velocities to understand the properties that make the lithosphere strong and the asthenosphere weak, including the presence of partial melt in the asthenosphere in hotter regions of the upper mantle. Fischer and her group have also found evidence for complex layering inside the thick lithosphere of the oldest continental regions on Earth, which has implications for the stability of this ancient lithosphere. Another theme is using seismic waves to map the direction in which the mantle is flowing, including the complex patterns of mantle flow that develop around subducting lithosphere and beneath the continents. Fischer studies the interplay of tectonic processes and the structure of the lithosphere, including rifting, strike-slip faulting, and continental plate collisions, and her work has improved understanding of how the crust of old mountain belts has evolved over time. To improve resolution of Earth structure, Fischer and her colleagues have installed temporary networks of broadband seismometers in the eastern and central U.S., the subduction zone in Costa Rica and Nicaragua, and the southern Appalachian mountains.

In 2019 Fischer received the Harry Fielding Reid Medal from the Seismological Society of America for "pioneering research on Earth’s upper mantle structure and dynamics, the structure and evolution of continental lithosphere, and the dynamics of subduction systems." In 2023 she was awarded the Inge Lehmann Medal from the American Geophysical Union for "outstanding contributions to the understanding of the structure, composition and dynamics of the Earth’s mantle."

== Awards ==
- Elected to the American Academy of Arts and Sciences (2025)
- Inge Lehmann Medal, American Geophysical Union (2023)
- Harry Fielding Reid Medal, Seismological Society of America (2019)
- Beno Gutenberg Lecture, American Geophysical Union (2016)
- Fellow, American Geophysical Union (2010)
- Royce Family Professorship for Excellence in Teaching, Brown University (2004-2007)
