= Christopher Scholz =

Christopher Scholz may refer to:

- Christopher A. Scholz, American geologist
- Christopher H. Scholz, American geologist & physicist (born 1943)
