= Inge Lehmann Medal =

The Inge Lehmann Medal is given out by the American Geophysical Union to recognize "outstanding contributions to the understanding of the structure, composition, and dynamics of the Earth's mantle and core". The award was created in 1995 and named after seismologist Inge Lehmann who discovered Earth's inner core.

== Past recipients ==
Source: American Geophysical Union

- 1997 Donald Helmberger
- 2000 Richard J. O'Connell
- 2001 John H. Woodhouse
- 2003 Francis Anthony Dahlen
- 2005 Thomas H. Jordan
- 2007 Ho-Kwang (Dave) Mao
- 2009 Barbara A. Romanowicz
- 2011 Donald Weidner
- 2013 Bradford H. Hager
- 2014 Thorne Lay
- 2015 Peter Olson
- 2016 Shun-ichiro Karato
- 2017 Brian Kennett
- 2018 Yoshio Fukao
- 2019 Ulrich R. Christensen
- 2020 Peter Shearer
- 2021 Jean-Paul Montagner
- 2022 Stephen Grand
- 2023 Karen M. Fischer
- 2024 Mike Gurnis
- 2025 Hitoshi Kawakatsu

== See also ==
- List of geophysicists
- List of geophysics awards
- Prizes named after people
