= Thorne Lay =

American seismologist

- Born: 1956 (age 69–70); Casper, Wyoming
- Awards: Harry Fielding Reid Medal (2014); Gold Medal of the Royal Astronomical Society (2021)

Academic background
- Education: University of Rochester (B.S., 1978); California Institute of Technology (M.S., PhD).
- Thesis: Analysis of Upper and Lower Mantle Structure Using Shear Waves (1983)
- Doctoral advisor: Bradford H. Hager
- Other advisors: Donald V. Helmberger; Hiroo Kanamori

Academic work
- Discipline: Geophysics
- Institutions: University of California, Santa Cruz
- Main interests: Seismology

Thorne Lay (born 1956) is an American seismologist. He is a professor of earth and planetary sciences at the University of California, Santa Cruz. Lay was awarded the senior medal of the Seismological Society of America in 2014, and the Gold Medal of the Royal Astronomical Society in 2021.

== Early life ==
Lay was born in Casper, Wyoming in 1956, where his father worked for the Wyoming Geological Survey. Lay moved to Dallas, Texas as a child, where his father worked on the infrasound monitoring of Soviet atmospheric nuclear tests, and attended law school. Lay developed an interest in geology from family vacations, and later joined some geological field excursions run by the University of Texas, El Paso.

== Education and career ==
Lay received a B.S. from the University of Rochester in 1978 in geomechanics; a dual degree in geology and mechanical engineering. He then moved to the California Institute of Technology for graduate study, where he gained an M.S. in 1980, and a Ph.D. in 1983, in seismology.

In his research, Lay has worked on a number of topics in seismology, relating both to the physics of earthquakes, and the use of seismic waves to understand the deep structure of the planet. He has been recognised for his work with medals and awards from the American Geophysical Union and the Seismological Society of America, among others, and was elected to the US National Academy of Sciences in 2014. In 2021, he was awarded the Gold Medal of the Royal Astronomical Society, for his "outstanding contributions to seismological analysis".

== Selected awards and academic honors ==
- Gold Medal, Royal Astronomical Society, 2021.
- USTC Distinguished Lecture Series in Earth and Space Sciences, 2015
- IRIS/SSA Distinguished Lecturer, 2015
- Honorary Professor, Xi'an Jiaotong University, 2014
- Inge Lehmann Medal, American Geophysical Union, 2014
- Harry Fielding Reid Medal, Seismological Society of America, 2014
- Elected Member, National Academy of Sciences, 2014
- Gutenberg Lecturer of Seismology Section, American Geophysical Union, 2011
- Elected Fellow, American Association for the Advancement of Science, 2009
- Elected Fellow, American Academy of Arts and Sciences, 2008
- Macelwane Medal and Fellow, American Geophysical Union, 1991
