= Thomas H. Heaton =

American seismologist

- Education: Caltech
- Known for: Seismology and Earthquake source physics
- Scientific career
- Fields: Seismology, Earthquake Physics, Engineering
- Workplaces: Caltech
- Doctoral advisor: Donald Helmberger

Thomas H. (Tom) Heaton is an American seismologist, known for his influential contributions in earthquake source physics and earthquake early warning. Currently he is the professor of geophysics and civil engineering at California Institute of Technology (Caltech) and one of the world's leading experts on seismology.

== Biography ==
Heaton attended Bates College for two years after high school. He transferred to Indiana University Bloomington and received his B.S. in 1972, and Doctor of Philosophy from California Institute of Technology in 1978. He wrote his Ph.D. thesis on ray theory and its application to seismology, under the supervision of seismologist Don Helmberger. After graduation, Heaton joined the United States Geological Survey (USGS) in 1979. There he worked as a research geophysicist in their Pasadena office from 1979 until July 1995, at which time he was the USGS project chief of the Southern California Seismic Network. He was the scientist in charge of the USGS Pasadena office from 1985 until October 1992 and he was also the coordinator of the USGS earthquake program in southern California. Heaton returned to Caltech in 1995 where he resumed the post of the professor of geophysics and civil engineering. Heaton is married and has three children.

== Research ==
Heaton's research has principally focused on seismology and earthquake physics, with emphasis on earthquake rupture dynamics, earthquake early warning and strong ground motion. He is perhaps best known in the scientific community for his several contributions in source inversions and specially his influential 1990 paper "Evidence for and Implications of self healing pulses of slip in earthquakes", where he clearly provided evidence for the existence of another mode of rupture for earthquakes; namely the pulse like mode, other than the widely accepted crack like model that was adopted at that time. This paper triggered a new way for earthquake scientists to look at earthquake ruptures.

=== Strong ground motion ===
Heaton's work is aimed at a more complete understanding of the nature of ground shaking close to large earthquakes. That is, ground motions from large earthquakes are simulated by propagating waves through 3-dimensional Earth structure models. The models produce realistic estimates of the large displacements (several meters in several seconds) that occur in great earthquakes. While accelerations that are associated with these large displacements may not be large enough to cause failure of strong, shear-wall structures, they may cause severe deformations in flexible buildings that rely heavily on ductility for their performance in large earthquakes. Heaton's group work in that field focuses on investigating the potential performance of steel moment-resisting-frame buildings and base-isolated buildings in large subduction zone earthquakes.

=== Earthquake rupture physics and crustal stress ===
Heaton is particularly interested in understanding the origins of spatially heterogeneous slip in earthquakes. There is compelling evidence that slip in earthquakes and stress in the Earth's crust are spatially heterogeneous, and perhaps fractal. Several approaches are being pursued in his group to understand the dynamic properties of this system. One of the approaches is the 3D finite element modeling for regions in the crust with ruptures occurring on fault planes controlled by dynamic friction and looking for conditions that are required to sustain the observed heterogeneous characteristics of stress and slip in cycles of earthquakes. On the other hand, Heaton was among the first to recognize that the heterogeneity in the crust could be modeled by 3D fractal tensors models for stress. With Deborah E. Smith, they generated those fractal stress tensors and used them to produce catalogs of earthquake locations and focal mechanisms. They could explain several field observations with this model. Also the model predicts that the strength of the crust should be a scale dependent property, a topic which is currently being further investigated in Heaton's group.

=== Earthquake warning systems ===
Heaton was initially interested in earthquake prediction. However, one of the implications of his now accepted pulse like model for earthquake ruptures is that predicting when an earthquake is going to happen is very difficult if not impossible. This is because it does not require that the background stress on the fault plane to be uniformly high everywhere in order to initiate rupture as pulse like ruptures can propagate in relatively low background stress. Accordingly, stresses need only to be high at isolated locations which may not be accessible to direct observation as those locations are not apriori known. However, the pulse like rupture mode has an inherent merit; it implies that the slip at any point ceases within a short period of time after the passage of the rupture front at this location and long before the whole earthquake stops. Since scaling relations between slip and total rupture length exist, the pulse like model implies that it may be possible to predict, at least in a probabilistic sense, how long the earthquake rupture could be once the slip values at some points are recorded and in the pulse like model we can have information about final slip values shortly after the initiation of rupture. This opens new premises in the field of earthquake early warnings. The virtual seismologist, which is an innovative earthquake early warning technique, is an example of the achievements of Heaton's group in that field.

== Publications ==
Heaton has written on topics in seismology, earthquake physics, earthquake early warning and building vibrations. In 1990 he wrote his influential paper on evidence for and implications of pulse like ruptures in real earthquakes. The view before that time was that earthquakes propagate as shear cracks on fault planes in the Earth's crust. In this crack like models, each point on the fault continues to slip for a substantial part of the total duration of the earthquake. Once the point starts to slip, it will continue to do that until waves are reflected back from the ends of the fault carrying information that the earthquake has already reached its full rupture length. By studying slip inversions of several real earthquakes, Heaton came to the conclusion that the crack like view is not always true. On the contrary, he found that the slip duration at any point on the fault usually does not exceed one tenth of the total earthquake time. This implies that the rupture heals shortly after its initiation at any point and he provided examples of possible physical mechanisms that can result in this early healing. Heaton's view was faced by a huge controversy but it triggered a lot of research to test his model. Numerous analytical, numerical and experimental work have been done in the subsequent years that showed supporting evidence for Heaton's model. Pulse like mode of rupture is now a widely accepted model and it is sometimes even called Heaton Pulses honoring Heaton's contribution in that field.

== Honors and awards ==
- Seismological Society of America (President 1993–1995)
- 1995 Meritorious Service award from the U.S. Department of Interior
- 2007 Fellow of the American Geophysical Union
