= Macelwane =

Macelwane is a surname. Notable people with the surname include:

- Geraldine Macelwane (1909–1974), American jurist
- James B. Macelwane (1883–1956), Jesuit Catholic priest and seismologist

== See also ==
- Mount Macelwane, mountain in Antarctica
