= ZHS =

ZHS may refer to:

Germany

- Zentrale Hochschulsportanlage, the biggest university sports facility in Germany

United States

- Zachary High School, a high school in Zachary, Louisiana (Baton Rouge metropolitan area)
- Zanesville High School, a high school in Zanesville, Ohio
- Zephyrhills High School, a high school in Zephyrhills, Florida
- Zillah High School, a high school in Zillah, Washington State
- Zuni High School, a public high school in Zuni, New Mexico
- Zumberge Hall of Science, a building in the University of Southern California
