= Peter M. Shearer =

Peter M. Shearer is an American geophysics professor of the University of California, San Diego. He wrote Introduction to Seismology (1999), received an Inge Lehmann Medal in 2020 and the Harry Fielding Reid Medal of the Seismological Society of America (SSA) in 2026. He was president of the SSA in 2018 and 2019. He became a fellow of the American Geophysical Union in 1999.
