= Gregory Beroza =

Seismologist at Stanford University

Gregory C. Beroza
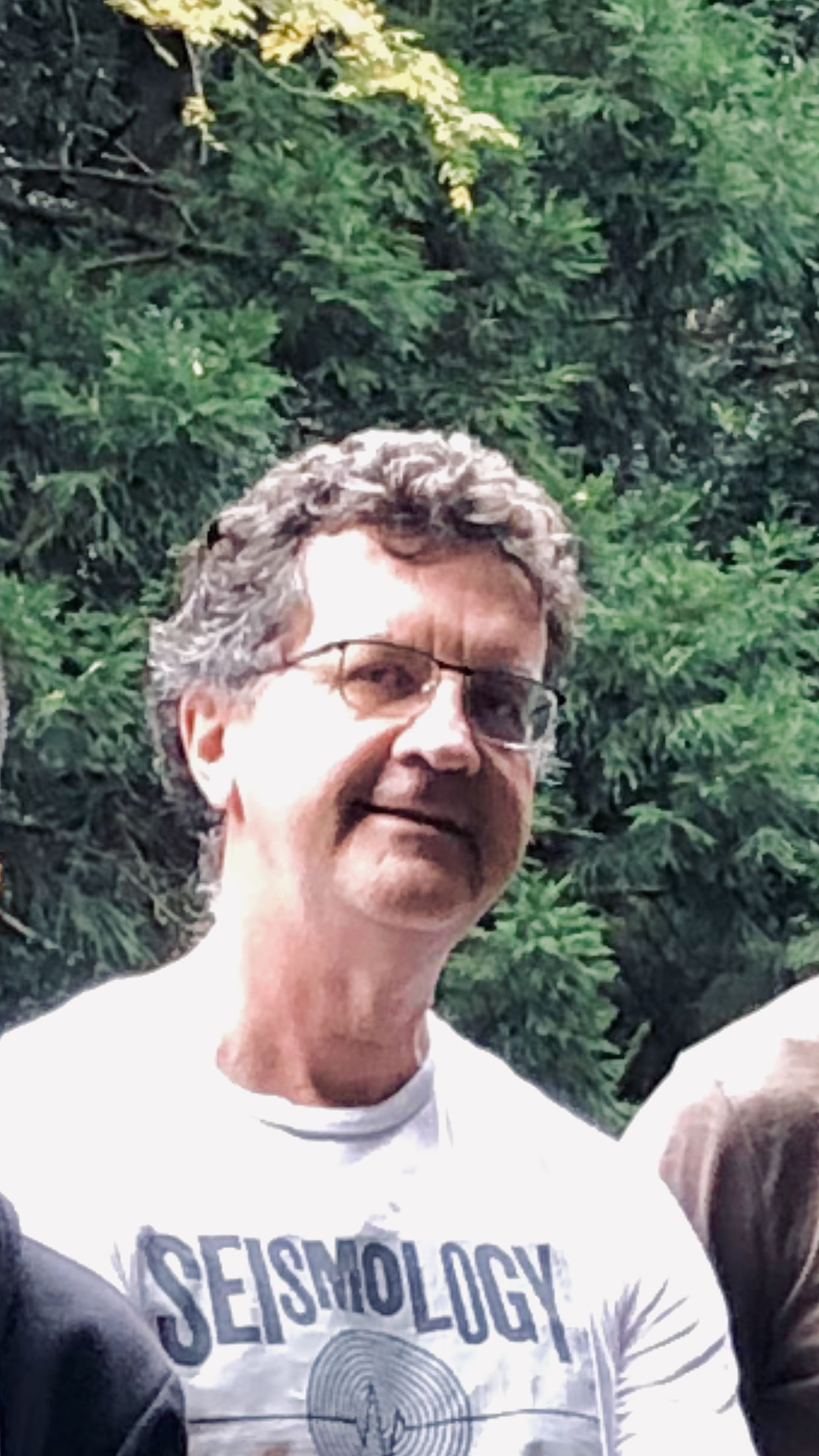
- Greg in Japan, 2019
- Born: October 10, 1959 (age 67)
- Other name: Greg
- Citizenship: American
- Education: 1989 PhD Massachusetts Institute of Technology; 1982 B.S UCSC
- Scientific career
- Fields: Seismology, Geophysics
- Workplaces: Stanford University
- Doctoral advisor: Thomas H. Jordan

Gregory C. Beroza (born October 10, 1959) is a seismologist and the Wayne Loel Professor of Earth Sciences at Stanford University. He is also the co-director of the Southern California Earthquake Center. He was elected to the fellow of American Geophysical Union in 2008. He was elected a member of the National Academy of Sciences in 2022.

== Education and early career ==
Gregory obtained his bachelor's degree from University of California, Santa Cruz in 1982 and his PhD degree from MIT in 1989. He became a faculty in Stanford geophysics in 1990 after being a post-doc researcher at MIT.

== Research ==
=== Fingerprint And Similarity Thresholding (FAST) ===
The Fingerprint And Similarity Thresholding algorithm was developed by Beroza group to "efficiently detect previously overlooked microquakes". This method can analyze week-long seismic information in less than 2 hours, 140 times faster than the traditional autocorrelation method. Furthermore, the new technique would help better monitor and categorize earthquakes.

=== Human-induced earthquakes ===
Greg's team measured stress drops in a number of human-induced and natural earthquakes in central US. They found the ground motions in induced and natural earthquakes are largely the same. The results suggest the ground motion prediction equations can be also applied to human-induced earthquakes and can be used to reduce the earthquake hazards in central US.

== Awards ==
- 1991 NSF Presidential Young Investigator Award
- 2014 AGU Fellow
- 2021 AGU Beno Gutenberg Lecture
- 2021 The Alexander von Humboldt Foundation Research Award
- 2022 Elected to the National Academy of Sciences

== Partial bibliography ==
- Beroza, G. C., & Jordan, T. H. (1991). Rupture histories of the 1934 and 1966 Parkfield, California, earthquakes: a test of the characteristic earthquake hypothesis. Stanford, CA: The University. OCLC 32080287
- Beroza, G. C. (1995). Seismic source modeling (95RG00736). Reviews of Geophysics. 33, 299. ISSN 8755-1209 OCLC 89600682
- Beroza, G. C. (1997). "Earthquake Seismology". Geotimes. 42 (2), 53. ISSN 0016-8556 OCLC 87304084
- Beroza, G. C. (2003). Fault segmentation and possible pore fluid effects in the 1992 Landers, California aftershock sequence. Stanford, CA: Dept. of Geophysics, Stanford University. OCLC 57190036
- Beroza, G. C., & Bokelmann, G. H. R. (2002). Constraints on crustal and fault-zone rheology from earthquake mechanisms. Stanford, CA: Dept. of Geophysics, Stanford University. OCLC 57244579
