= World-Wide Standardized Seismograph Network =

The World-Wide Standardized Seismograph Network (WWSSN) – originally the World-Wide Network of Seismograph Stations (WWNSS) – was a global network of about 120 seismograph stations built in the 1960s that generated an unprecedented collection of high quality seismic data. This data enabled seismology to become a quantitative science, elucidated the focal mechanisms of earthquakes and the structure of the Earth's crust, and contributed to the development of plate tectonic theory. The WWSSN is credited with spurring a renaissance in seismological research.

== History ==
=== Origins ===
The WWSSN also "created a global network infrastructure, including the data-exchange procedures and station technical capabilities needed to support the establishment of the more advanced networks in operation today", and has been the model for every global seismic network since then.

The WWSSN arose from a political concern. In the 1950s concerns about radioactive fallout from above-ground testing of nuclear weapons prompted the leadership of the three leading nuclear nations (President Eisenhower of the United States, General Secretary Khrushchev of the Soviet Union, and Prime Minister Macmillan of the United Kingdom) to ban further testing of nuclear weapons.

However, there was a hitch. The United States would not agree to banning kinds of nuclear tests where there was no capability to detect and identify any violations, and for smaller, underground tests seismology was not sufficiently developed to have that capability. The Eisenhower Administration therefore convened the Berkner panel to recommend ways to improve the nation's seismic detection abilities. The Berkner report, issued in 1959, was the basis of a comprehensive research and development program known as Project Vela Uniform, funded through the U.S. Department of Defense Defense Advanced Research Projects Agency(DARPA).

DARPA then funded the U.S. Coast and Geodetic Survey (C&GS) to implement one of the Berkner Report recommendations, designing and building what became the WWSSN.

=== Installation and operation ===
Performance specifications and a request for proposals were published in November 1960, a contract awarded in early 1961, and the first station was installed in the C&GS Albuquerque (New Mexico) Seismological Laboratory (ASL) in October 1961. An additional 89 stations were installed by the end of 1963, and the network was essentially complete by the end of 1967 with 117 stations, with 121 stations eventually installed. These were mostly outside of the U.S., but not in Canada (they had their own system), the Soviet-bloc countries, China or France (they were building their own nuclear weapons and wanted to retain an option for testing), or French-speaking countries.

=== Decline and transfer ===
DARPA funding ended in fiscal year 1967 (July 1966–June 1967), and plans for transferring funding responsibilities to the Commerce Department were blocked by an impasse in Congress. Though other agencies contributed partial funding (mainly for purchase and shipping of photographic supplies), permanent funding was not obtained, and routine maintenance and training were suspended. In 1973 ASL and WWSSN were transferred to the United States Geological Survey, and operation of the network continued at a reduced level of support until it was terminated in 1996.

=== Digital successor ===
In the late 1970s digital recorders were added to 13 WWSSN stations; these "DWWSSN" stations operated as part of the Global Digital Seismographic Network (GSDN). Successor to the WWSSN is the Global Seismographic Network (GSN), operated by the Incorporated Research Institutions for Seismology, now EarthScope Consortium.

=== Soviet counterpart ===
A similar system, the Unified System of Seismic Stations (ESSN, transliterated from Russian), was built in the USSR with 168 stations using Kirnos seismographs.

== Technical design ==
A principal feature of the WWSSN was that each station had identical equipment, uniformly calibrated. These consisted of three short-period (~1 second) seismographs (oriented north–south, east–west, and vertically), three long-period (~15 seconds) seismographs, and an accurate radio-synchronized crystal-controlled clock. The seismograms were produced on photographic drum recorders, developed on-site, then sent to a Data Center for copying onto 70-mm and 35-mm film (until 1978, and then after onto microfiche). The WWSSN also featured a data distribution system that made this data available to anyone at nominal cost from a single location, providing the basis for much research.

== See also ==
- Partial Nuclear Test Ban Treaty of 1963
- Project Vela

== Sources ==
- Agnew, Duncan (2002). "1 – History of Seismology". International Handbook of Earthquake & Engineering Seismology, Part A. International Handbook of Earthquake & Engineering Seismology. pp. 3–11. ISBN 0-12-440652-1. LCCN 2002103787..
- Ammon, Charles J.; Lay, Thorne; Simpson, David W. (November–December 2010), "Great Earthquakes and Global Seismic Network" (PDF), Seismological Research Letters, 81 (6): 965–971, doi:10.1785/gssrl.81.6.965.
- Barth, Kai-Henrik (October 2003), "The Politics of Seismology: Nuclear Testing, Arms Control, and the Transformation of a Discipline", Social Studies of Science, 33 (5): 743–781, doi:10.1177/0306312703335005, S2CID 110810982.
- "Appendix 1A" (PDF), Science Plan for A New Global Seismographic Network, IRIS Consortium, December 1984, LCCN 84-82089.
- Lee, William H. K. (2002). "17 – Challenges in Observational Seismology". International Handbook of Earthquake & Engineering Seismology, Part A. International Handbook of Earthquake & Engineering Seismology. pp. 269–281. ISBN 0-12-440652-1. LCCN 2002103787..
- Oliver, J.; Murphy, L. (11 October 1971), "WWNSS: Seismology's Global Network of Observing Stations", Science, 174 (4006): 254–261, Bibcode:1971Sci...174..254O, doi:10.1126/science.174.4006.254, PMID 17778051, S2CID 27711713.
- Peterson, Jon; Hutt, Charles R. (2014), World-Wide Standardized Seismograph Network: A Data Users Guide (PDF), vol. Open-File Report 2014–1218, United States Geological Survey.
- Powell, Tom; Fries, Donald (April 1964), Handbook: World-Wide Standard Seismograph Network (PDF), Acoustics and Seismics Laboratory, Institute of Science and Technogy, University of Michigan.
- Richards, Paul G.; Zavales, John (1996), "Seismological Methods for Monitoring a CTBT: The Technical Issues Arising in Early Negotiations" (PDF), in Husebye, Eystein S.; Dainty, Anton M. (eds.), Monitoring a Comprehensive Test Ban Treaty, NATO ASI Series, vol. 303, pp. 53–81, ISBN 978-94-010-4187-4.
- Storchak, D. A.; Di Giacomo, D.; Engdahl, E. R.; Harris, J.; Bondár, I.; Lee, W.H.K.; Bormann, P.; Villaseñor, A. (February 2015), "The ISC-GEM Global Instrumental Earthquake Catalogue (1900–2009): Introduction", Physics of the Earth and Planetary Interiors, 239: 48–63, Bibcode:2015PEPI..239...48S, doi:10.1016/j.pepi.2014.06.009.
