= Tatyana G. Rautian =

Russian seismologist

Tatyana Glebovna Rautian is a Russian seismologist.

She co-developed the K-class (or Energy class) scale, an alternative to the magnitude scales of the West, based on radiated energy of earthquakes, which was used in the USSR starting in the late 1950s. She also extensively studied the seismicity of Central Asia, having worked in Gharm, Tajikistan. Her work included the influential use of coda waves to retrieve information about the source of earthquakes, the properties of seismic waves generated by explosions.

In 1949, she won the Soviet rowing championship.

She worked for the Russian Academy of Sciences Institute of Physics of the Earth Schmidt Academy of Sciences where her husband, Vitaly I. Khalturin also worked and with whom she often collaborated scientifically.

She visited Indiana University in 1993 and 1994, and worked at the Lamont-Doherty Earth Observatory between 1993 and 2005.

In 2010, she was the recipient of the Harvey Fielding Reid medal, the Seismological Society of America's highest honour.
