= Ulrich Christensen =

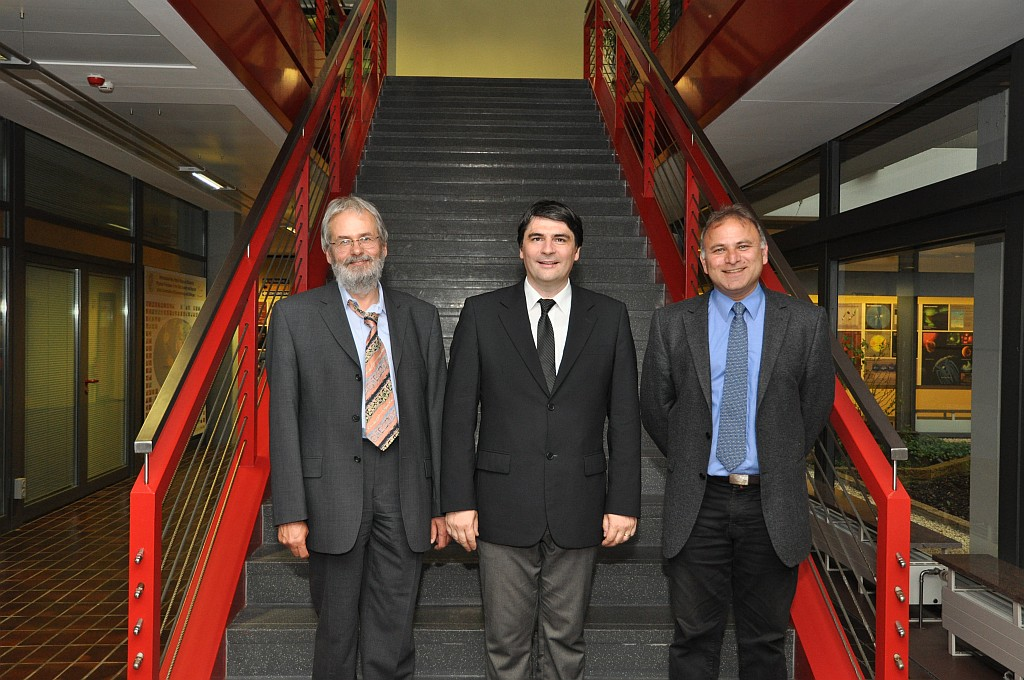
- Christensen (left) in 2011
- Occupation: Ulrich Christensen

Academic background
- Education: professor

Academic work
- Discipline: Geology
- Institutions: Georg-August-Universität Göttingen

Ulrich R. Christensen is a German geophysicist. He taught at the Georg-August-Universität Göttingen and served as director at the Max Planck Institute for Solar System Research. He won an Inge Lehmann Medal from the American Geophysical Union in 2019, an Augustus Love Medal from the European Geosciences Union and a Leibniz Prize.
