= Southern California Earthquake Center =

Research Institute based in Los Angeles, CA

Coordinates: 34°1′13″N 118°17′8″W

Statewide California Earthquake Center
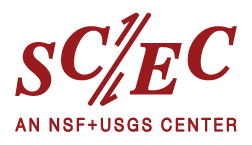
- Formation: 1991
- Headquarters: Los Angeles, California
- Members: 18 Core Institutions and 75 Participating Institutions
- Director: Ahmed Elbanna
- Co-Director: Gregory C. Beroza
- Website: www.scec.org

The Statewide California Earthquake Center (SCEC) is a collaboration of more than 1,000 scientists across 100 research institutions focused primarily on conducting research on earthquakes in Southern California and elsewhere by gathering data, conducting theoretical studies, and performing computer simulations; integrate information into a comprehensive, physics-based understanding of earthquake phenomena; and communicate that understanding to end-users and society at large as useful knowledge for reducing earthquake risk and improving community resilience.

SCEC headquarters are at the University of Southern California. SCEC partners with many other research and education/outreach organizations in many disciplines. Primary funding for SCEC activities is provided by the National Science Foundation and the United States Geological Survey. The current director of SCEC is Ahmed Elbanna.

The Southern California Earthquake Center (SCEC) was founded as a Science & Technology Center on February 1, 1991, with joint funding by the National Science Foundation (NSF) and the U. S. Geological Survey (USGS). SCEC graduated from the STC Program in 2002 and has been funded as a stand-alone center under cooperative agreements with both agencies in four consecutive phases: SCEC2, 1 Feb 2002 to 31 Jan 2007; SCEC3, 1 Feb 2007 to 31 Jan 2012; SCEC4, 1 Feb 2012 to 31 Jan 2017; and SCEC5, 1 Feb 2017 to 31 Jan 2022. As of 2024, SCEC expanded to include all of California and became the Statewide California Earthquake Center.

== Headquarters ==
SCEC Headquarters are located at the University of Southern California's University Park campus just south of Downtown Los Angeles. Administrative offices for SCEC are located on the first floor of the Zumberge Hall of Science (ZHS) on Trousdale Parkway. Other facilities in Zumberge Hall include an outreach and education office, software development and research computing office, undergraduate computer lab, office of director Yehuda Ben-Zion as well as several meeting rooms.

== Center renaming ==
As of October of 2023 the center was renamed to Statewide California Earthquake Center from its previous name the Southern California Earthquake Center under which it operated since 1991. The center acronym has remained unchanged.

== Research ==
SCEC coordinates fundamental research on earthquake processes using Southern California as its main natural laboratory. Currently, over 1,000 earthquake professionals are participating in SCEC projects. SCEC’s long-range science vision is to develop dynamical models of earthquake processes that are comprehensive, integrative, verified, predictive, and validated against observations. The science goal of the SCEC core program is to provide new concepts that can improve the predictability of the earthquake system models, new data for testing the models, and a better understanding of model uncertainties. SCEC is one of three institutions (the other being the California Geological Survey and USGS) that form the Working Group on California Earthquake Probabilities (WGCEP), responsible for creating the California earthquake "forecast," UCERF. The current version, with the latest forecast results, is known as UCERF3.

== Core institutions ==
SCEC Headquarters in Zumberge Hall

Core institutions involved in SCEC research include but are not limited to:

- University of Southern California (headquarters)
- California Institute of Technology
- Columbia University, Lamont–Doherty Earth Observatory
- San Diego State University
- University of California,
  - University of California, Davis
  - University of California, Los Angeles
  - University of California, Riverside
  - University of California, San Diego
  - University of California, Santa Barbara
  - University of California, Santa Cruz
- University of Nevada, Reno
- Harvard University
- Massachusetts Institute of Technology
- Stanford University
- U.S. Geological Survey
  - Golden
  - Moffett Field
  - Pasadena

== Education and Outreach programs ==
=== Great ShakeOut Earthquake Drills ===
Since 2008, SCEC has coordinated Great ShakeOut Earthquake ShakeOut Drills, a worldwide earthquake safety movement.

=== Internships: UseIT and SURE ===
SCEC currently operates two different internship programs funded in part by the National Science Foundation and the United States Department of Defense as well as several other institutions including the University of Southern California and the United States Geological Survey. These two programs are the UseIT program which is directed towards developing software for understanding earthquakes worldwide and the SURE program which is aimed at more focused topics of research in the Earth Sciences. The director of these two programs is Dr. Gabriela Noriega.

The SCEC UseIT (Undergraduate Studies in Earthquake Information Technology) program, unites undergraduates who are sophomores, juniors, or seniors in the coming fall, taking potentially any major, and coming from colleges and universities across the continent to participate in a leading-edge program at SCEC headquarters.

SCEC/UseIT interns work on multi-disciplinary, collaborative teams to tackle a scientific "Grand Challenge" posed by 2002–2017 SCEC director Dr. Thomas H. Jordan. The Grand Challenge varies each year but always entails performing computer science research that is needed by earthquake scientists or outreach professionals.

The SCEC SURE (Summer Undergraduate Research Experience) program pairs a student, one-on-one, to conduct research with a pre-eminent earthquake scientist or specialist. Many SURE interns also have the opportunity to work alongside graduate students and post-doctoral researchers, and thus gain the special perspective of these early career professionals.

Started in 1994, SCEC/SURE has supported students to work in a very wide variety of fields related to earthquake science, including paleoseismic field investigations, remote sensing, risk mitigation, seismic velocity modeling, effects of earthquakes on natural resources such as groundwater, science education, information technology, and earthquake engineering.

=== Earthquake Country Alliance ===
The Earthquake Country Alliance is administered by SCEC and organizes many earthquake preparedness and mitigation activities around California, such as regional workshops, the Great California ShakeOut Earthquake Drill, and an microgrants program called the "ECA Mini-Awards." The website, features many resources for the public. The Earthquake Country Alliance (ECA) is described by itself as a public-private-grassroots partnership of people, organizations, and regional alliances that work together to improve earthquake and tsunami preparedness, mitigation and resiliency.

== See also ==
- Thomas H. Jordan
- Keiiti Aki
