= Stephen Grand =

American geologist

Stephen P. Grand is an American geologist, currently the Carleton Professor of Geophysics at University of Texas at Austin. He won a Inge Lehmann Medal in 2022.
