= Harry Fielding Reid =

American geophysicist

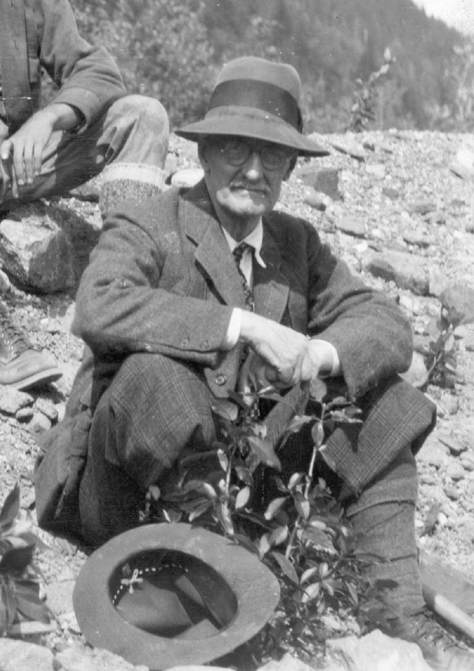
- Dr. H.F. Reid in Southeastern Alaska. (USGS photo by Charles Will Wright, 1933)
- Born: May 18, 1859; Baltimore, Maryland
- Died: June 18, 1944 (aged 85); Baltimore, Maryland
- Scientific career
- Fields: Geophysics
- Doctoral advisor: Henry Augustus Rowland
- Other academic advisors: James Joseph Sylvester

Harry Fielding Reid (May 18, 1859 – June 18, 1944) was an American geophysicist. He was notable for his contributions to glaciology and seismology, particularly his theory of elastic rebound that related faults to earthquakes. He was a professor of dynamical geology and geography at Johns Hopkins University.

== Early life ==
Harry Fielding Reid was born in Baltimore, the fourth of seven children of Andrew and Fanny Brooke Gwathmey Reid. Reid's mother was a descendant of Betty Washington Lewis, sister of George Washington; his father was a successful sugar merchant. The younger Reid's early education took him for at least one year to Switzerland; he is also known to have attended and graduated from the Pennsylvania Military Academy. In 1877 Reid enrolled at the newly founded Johns Hopkins University, from which he earned a A.B. in 1880 as part of the second graduating class. During the following year, he entered the Hopkins Ph.D. program, which was then revolutionizing American scientific and intellectual life. Reid studied under physicist Henry Rowland and mathematician J. J. Sylvester, two of the original Johns Hopkins professors. In February 1885 Reid was granted his doctorate with a dissertation on the spectra of platinum, an assignment typical of those that Rowland - the pioneering figure in modern spectral studies - gave his students.

While in graduate school Reid married Edith Gittings (1861–1954). Her father, James Gittings, was descended from a long-standing Baltimore County family with strong connections to the legal and medical communities of Maryland. Her mother was Mary Elizabeth MacGill, whose father was a physician in Hagerstown, MD. Together, Reid and his wife had two children: Francis Fielding Reid, born in 1892, and Doris Fielding Reid, born in 1895. Through the Gittings line the two Reid children were distant cousins to Wallis Warfield (born 1895-6), later Duchess of Windsor.

Through his mother, Harry Fielding Reid was a great-great-grandnephew of George Washington. In addition to this social connection, the Reids were closely involved in the academic world of Baltimore, particularly figures from the “heroic” era of the Johns Hopkins Medical School, like Sir William Osler, and graduate school friends such as Woodrow Wilson.

== Early career ==
From the autumn of 1884 through the early summer of 1886, Reid spent time studying and traveling across Europe. During the fall of ‘84 and winter of ‘85, he may have worked at the laboratory of Hermann von Helmholtz in Berlin. His wife was with him throughout his stay, and they were joined for most of their travels by her mother, Mary Elizabeth MacGill Gittings. Mrs. Gittings left a diary, written on four small account books and now in the special collections department of the Johns Hopkins University library, that gives valuable information about their early years as a family. Among her observations was that her daughter regarded the German language as one of “sneezes and splutters.” Gittings found the wintertime climate of Berlin to be “foggy and dismal,” noted that the locals still ate dinner in mid-afternoon, and saw that some students (even visiting Americans) continued to fight duels.

During the autumn of 1885, Reid, his wife and mother-in-law settled into a rented house in Cambridge, UK, and remained there for the better part of a year. Reid was soon introduced to J. J. Thomson, a young physicist who had recently been appointed to a professorship at Trinity College and made director of the Cavendish Laboratory. This friendship, both professional and personal, was to continue within the Reid and Thomson families up to the present time (2007 CE). J. J. Thomson was 29 at the time they first met; Harry Fielding Reid was 26. Letters exchanged among the various family members reflect an intimacy that was born of their very early years together. Both J. J. Thomson and his son George Paget (1892–1975) went on to win Nobel Prizes for their pioneering work in subatomic physics. J. J. still holds a unique place in the history of physics for his work in making the Cavendish Laboratory perhaps the finest-ever school for training research physicists.

In the fall of 1886 Reid accepted an appointment at the Case School of Applied Science in Cleveland, Ohio. He taught physics and mathematics there for eight years before being appointed an Associate at Johns Hopkins, a rank that was the equivalent of today's Assistant Professor. For reasons not yet clear, Reid did not take the job immediately but worked for one year at the newly founded University of Chicago. By the spring of 1896, however, he and his immediate family were back living in Baltimore for good, and they moved into a large townhouse on Cathedral Street, just a short distance from Mt. Vernon Place - then the heart of “Society” Baltimore - and the home of his parents.

== Glaciology ==
While in Cleveland, Reid had begun to study glaciology. His interest in glaciers may have begun in childhood during trips to Switzerland, although the duration and character of such early travel is at present unknown. What is clear is that Reid eventually decided to undertake a serious study of the dynamics of glaciers, and in 1890 he organized a summertime trip to Glacier Bay in SE Alaska. He was accompanied by several young men from the Cleveland area, most of them students, one identified as H.P. Cushing. Cushing later had a long career as a geologist and was an elder brother of the celebrated neurosurgeon Harvey Cushing. Harvey Cushing went to Baltimore in 1896 to train at the newly founded Johns Hopkins Hospital before being chosen to head the surgery department at Brigham in Boston.

Reid's trip to Alaska resulted in his first professional publication, a long article in volume IV of the National Geographic Magazine, in those years still an academic journal. During 1892 he made a second expedition (like the first, evidently self-financed) with a small crew of hired men. Why any of the students and others from his first trip did not come a second time is unknown. Conditions in Alaska during that era could be at best called “pioneer,” and field scientists had no choice but to live in huts on the ice or else on camp on bare rock. The U.S. Navy sent a vessel past once each week during the warmer months, but the Glacier Bay region, like most of the territory of Alaska, was otherwise a wilderness that had only had the most cursory exploration done prior to 1890. Still, Reid took a set of measurements that showed how the glaciers were moving and changing, and he proposed a theory for how the front of a glacier maintained the shape that it did. The United States Geological Survey (USGS) later named one of these glaciers for him.

== Seismology ==
After returning to Baltimore, Reid devoted his next 35 years to a career in research and teaching at Johns Hopkins. The Geology Department had been founded several years before and was then under the chairmanship of Charles Bullock Clark. Reid's relationship with other members of his department is uncertain, and his professional identity was fluid as well. Geophysics was a new field at that time, and Reid could later fairly claim to be the first American scientist to practice it as a specialty. By 1911, and after a series of promotions, he was granted the title Professor of Dynamic Geology and Geography.

In 1902, Reid began to collect seismological data for the USGS. At that time the science of seismology was extremely new, and there were only a handful of working seismographs anywhere in the world. One was installed at the Johns Hopkins geology lab, and in 1911 Reid published the first comprehensive treatment on the subject in English. His interest in such measuring devices may have begun in the early 1880s with his study under Henry Rowland, who was a path-breaking figure in the use of fine instruments to measure and assess nature at the atomic level. Reid's British friend and colleague, J. J. Thomson, made use of a similar interest in measurement to prove the existence of the electron as a particle with both mass and charge.

The 1906 San Francisco earthquake offered Reid the chance to take his interest in seismology to a new level. Andrew Lawson was then chair of the geology department at the University of California at Berkeley, and Lawson had been one of the first (1888) Hopkins Ph.D.s in geology. Perhaps through his influence Reid was chosen the only non-Californian to study the great earthquake as part of a state-funded commission. Through a close examination of how different points of land along the California coast and nearby inland had moved over the course of the previous half century - here his access to USGS data was crucial - Reid was able to determine that the earthquake was a result of forces he identified as “elastic strain.” This strain had built up slowly but unequally at points along the San Andreas Fault, and it took a massive temblor to release the strain at that point along the fault where the greatest energy had accumulated.

During the previous generation European scientists had begun to wonder if faults were related to earthquakes, and vice versa, but it was Harry Fielding Reid who established that there was a clear and dynamic relationship. He called his new theory "Elastic Rebound," and it remains even into the 21st century at the foundation of modern tectonic studies.

== Recognition ==
Reid's reputation was now secure as the founding father of geophysics in the Western Hemisphere. Like his old Cambridge friend J. J. Thomson, he was acknowledged as a scientist of the first rank. There was not a Nobel Prize to win for geology, but Reid was elected to the American Philosophical Society in 1910, the National Academy of Sciences in 1912 and served as president of the American Geophysical Union from 1924-26. He corresponded with various European Societies concerned with glaciology and seismology, and in December 1926 he and his wife traveled to Japan as invited guests of an international conference on earthquake studies.

== Personality and research style ==
Harry Fielding Reid's life bridged the gap that divided the early years of modern science, when successful men like Sir Joseph Banks and Benjamin Franklin worked on their own or financed the work of their friends, and a later era, from the final decades of the 19th century, when government and institutional financing caused science to become better organized even as it was made into a more bureaucratic enterprise. Reid's long trip to Europe from 1884 to 1886 appears to have been financed by his father, or so it appears from a letter his wife later wrote (in the fall of 1886) to J. J. Thomson. There is also the evidence, among his surviving papers at Johns Hopkins, of an account book from Reid's early years of collecting data for the USGS (1902–14). That account book, which mostly records small amounts for secretarial expenses and the like, implies that Reid was expecting reimbursement from the USGS. He was not, however, earning a salary. Here seems a clear illustration of the turn that scientific inquiry was taking by 1902: there was evidently no regular income involved, yet Reid was not expected to foot the bill entirely on his own. Government subsidy – also taking place at Johns Hopkins as the geology faculty did work for the Maryland State Highway Department after 1898 – also meant greater accountability: hence Reid's careful recording of expenses.

Beginning in at least 1896 with the death of his father, Reid had a significant private income, at least some of which he dedicated to scientific research. He was later memorialized by colleague Andrew Lawson as having been “blessed with a charming character,” that it was “always a joy to meet him.” Lawson also remarked that Reid might seem “austere” to those unknown to him, yet that was typical for the Southern elite of his day. He was a small but physically strong man, a gymnast when young and an active mountain climber through much of his long life. He is not known to have produced any Ph.D. geophysicists through the geology department at Johns Hopkins, but he did serve as an advisor to students in other fields.

== Legacy ==
Reid's son Francis Fielding earned an M.D. degree from the University of Maryland in 1930 but apparently did not practice medicine other than during his U.S. Army career. His daughter Doris Fielding eventually gave up pursuit of music and art to work as a bond trader on Wall Street and in the U.S. Government bond market in Washington, D.C. She was life partner to the popular Classicist Edith Hamilton and together they raised the elder Reids' first grandchild, Francis Dorian Fielding. Reid's sister Ellen married the celebrated poet and preacher Henry van Dyke, who was the author of dozens of books, taught English at Princeton and served as U.S. Minister to the Netherlands during World War I. His younger brother Andrew Melville stayed in the family commodities business for some period of time but then established a second home and family in the south of France.

Reid died June 18, 1944. He and his brother Andrew, along with Edith Gittings Reid and her mother, are buried in Baltimore's Greenmount Cemetery. Their markers are surrounded by the graves of various governors, mayors, Civil War generals and other representatives of the historic Baltimore elite. Reid continues to be recognized by geologists as one of their discipline's founding fathers. Every year the Seismological Society of America recognizes a fellow scientist for having contributed that year's finest work in seismology: their award is still named the Harry Fielding Reid Medal.

== Works ==
- — (1896). "Variations of Glaciers". Science. 3 (76): 867. Bibcode:1896Sci.....3..867F. doi:10.1126/science.3.76.867. PMID 17739885.
- — (1908). "The Meeting of the International Seismological Association". Science. 27 (680): 74–76. doi:10.1126/science.27.680.74-a. PMID 17745789.
- — (1909). "Mr. Manson's Theory of Geological Climate". Science. 29 (731): 27–29. Bibcode:1909Sci....29...27F. doi:10.1126/science.29.731.27. PMID 17756907.
- — (1920). "The Problems of Seismology". Proceedings of the National Academy of Sciences of the United States of America. 6 (10): 555–61. Bibcode:1920PNAS....6..555F. doi:10.1073/pnas.6.10.555. PMC 1084633. PMID 16576538.
- — (1925). "The Second General Assembly of the International Geophysical Union". Science. 61 (1578): 328–330. Bibcode:1925Sci....61..328F. doi:10.1126/science.61.1578.328. PMID 17776483.
