= Shamita Das =

Emeritus Professor

- Citizenship: U.K.
- Scientific career
- Thesis: A numerical study of rupture propagation and earthquake source mechanism (1976)
- Doctoral advisor: Keiiti Aki

Shamita Das is an emeritus professor at the University of Oxford and an emeritus fellow at Exeter College. She is known for her research on earthquakes, in particular the speed that earthquakes can propagate through the earth.

== Education and career ==
Das has a G.C.E. from Cambridge (1962), a B.Sc. (1965) and an M.Sc. (1967) in mathematics from the University of Calcutta, India, an M.S. in geophysics from Boston College (1972), and an Sc.D.in geophysics from the Massachusetts Institute of Technology (1976). Das held postdoctoral positions at Massachusetts Institute of Technology, was a research scientist at Gulf Oil, and a fellow at Columbia at University. In 1983 she became a senior research scientist at Lamont-Doherty Geological Observatory, a position she held until 1990. Starting in 1990 she held positions at Oxford University, where she transitioned to emeritus professor in 2013. As of 2001, she also holds a position at Exeter College, in Oxford.

== Research ==
Das's research is on earthquake source mechanics. Her graduate research centered on the propagation of cracks and she developed a numerical model of earthquakes that enabled the prediction of aftershocks after an earthquake. While at Lamont Doherty Earth Observatory, Das worked on the relevance of the source point for an earthquake with respect to the scale of an earthquake.

Das's research on the speed that earthquakes can break apart has implications for predicting the degree of damage from an earthquake. This research compared the 1906 San Francisco earthquake and the 2001 Kunlun earthquake and showed that earthquake faults that are straight, e.g., the San Andreas fault, enable the earthquake to move rapidly through the rock. Das developed a method to invert seismograms that was applied to the 1986 earthquake in the Andreanof Islands and revealed the long-term motion of the Aleutian arc. Das is also known for her work on the 1989 Macquarie Ridge earthquake on the Macquarie Fault Zone. With Andrea Bizzarri, Das worked on how shear fractions move between zones defined by Rayleigh wave speeds and shear wave speeds.

In 2015, Das reviewed the research on measuring the speed of earthquake propagation since her 1977 paper, including a consideration of the theoretical modeling, methods for analyzing seismic waveforms, field examples in which these methods have been applied, laboratory experiments, and examples of faults where high speeds of sheer will be possible.

=== Selected publications ===
- Das, Shamita; Aki, Keiiti (1977). "Fault plane with barriers: A versatile earthquake model". Journal of Geophysical Research. 82 (36): 5658–5670. Bibcode:1977JGR....82.5658D. doi:10.1029/JB082i036p05658. ISSN 2156-2202.
- Kostrov, B.V.; Das, Shamita (1988). Principles of earthquake source mechanics. Cambridge, England: Cambridge University Press. ISBN 0-521-30345-1. OCLC 17547259.
- Das, Shamita (2015), "Supershear Earthquake Ruptures – Theory, Methods, Laboratory Experiments and Fault Superhighways: An Update", in Ansal, Atilla (ed.), Perspectives on European Earthquake Engineering and Seismology: Volume 2, Geotechnical, Geological and Earthquake Engineering, vol. 39, Cham: Springer International Publishing, pp. 1–20, doi:10.1007/978-3-319-16964-4_1, ISBN 978-3-319-16964-4

== Awards and honors ==
- Fellow, American Geophysical Union (2015)
- Inge Lehmann Award, European Seismological Commission (2014)
