= Nash Hills =

Antarctic hill range

Nash Hills (81°53′S 89°23′W) is a short range of isolated mostly ice-covered hills about 25 nautical miles (46 km) northwest of Martin Hills. The feature was positioned by the U.S. Ellsworth-Byrd Traverse Party on December 10, 1958. Named by Advisory Committee on Antarctic Names (US-ACAN) for Lieutenant Archie R. Nash, U.S. Navy, Officer-in-Charge at Byrd Station in 1962.

== See also ==
- Mount Byerly
- Mount Macelwane
