= Richard J. O'Connell =

American geophysicist

- Born: Richard John O'Connell; August 27, 1941; Helena, Montana
- Died: April 2, 2015 (aged 73); Cambridge, Massachusetts
- Education: California Institute of Technology
- Scientific career
- Fields: Geophysics
- Workplaces: Harvard University

Richard John O'Connell (August 27, 1941 – April 2, 2015) was an American geophysicist working on the internal dynamics of the Earth and how they evolved over time and are observed at the surface. He received his B.S., M.S., and Ph.D. degrees from California Institute of Technology, and spent most of his further academic career at Harvard University.

O'Connell received the Inge Lehmann Medal from American Geophysical Union in 2000, the Arthur L. Day Medal from Geological Society of America in 2001, and the Augustus Love Medal from the European Geosciences Union in 2008. He was a fellow of the American Geophysical Union, the American Association for the Advancement of Science, and American Academy of Arts and Sciences.
