= William Ellsworth (geophysicist) =

American seismologist

William L. Ellsworth is an American seismologist who is a research faculty member at Stanford University. His research covers a range of topics of earthquake science focusing on the physics of earthquake nucleation, earthquake hazard assessment, and active fault processes as studied through earthquakes. He is the 2021 recipient of the Harry Fielding Reid Medal, the highest honor of the Seismological Society of America.

== Education ==
Ellsworth received a BS in physics and a MS in geophysics from Stanford University in 1971. He received his doctorate in geophysics from Massachusetts Institute of Technology in 1978.

== Career ==
Ellsworth started his career at the United States Geological Survey (USGS) in 1971 where he worked until 2015. During his time at the USGS, he served as the chief of the Branch of Seismology from 1982 to 1988, in addition to being the chief scientist of the USGS Earthquake Hazards team from 2002 to 2005. In 2015, he joined the faculty of Stanford University, where he also serves as a co-director for the Stanford Center for Induced and Triggered Seismicity (SCITS).

== Research ==
Ellsworth has done research in a wide range of topics associated with earthquake processes. Among his notable studies, is the work he did with Felix Waldhauser on the development of a double difference earthquake relocation algorithm, published in 2000. Through his work with SCITS, Ellsworth has also worked on research to understand the physics of earthquakes associated with human activities.

== Awards and honors ==
- Department of the Interior Distinguished Service Award, 2010
- Selected American Geophysical Union Fellow 2001
- American Geophysical Union, Seismology Section, Gutenberg Lecture, 2018
- Seismological Society of America, Harry Fielding Reid Medal 2021

== Selected publications ==
- Felix Waldhauser, William L. Ellsworth; A Double-Difference Earthquake Location Algorithm: Method and Application to the Northern Hayward Fault, California. Bulletin of the Seismological Society of America 2000;; 90 (6): 1353–1368. doi:10.1785/0120000006
- Ellsworth, W. L. (2013). Injection-induced earthquakes, Science 341, doi:10.1126/science.1225942
