= John Peter Buwalda =

American geologist and educator

- Born: December 16, 1886; Zeeland, Michigan
- Died: August 19, 1954 (aged 67); Frazier Park, California
- Education: Ph.D. in geology, University of California, Berkeley, 1915
- Scientific career
- Fields: Geology, seismology
- Workplaces: California Institute of Technology
- Thesis: New Mammalian Faunas from Miocene Sediments Near Tehachapi Pass in the Southern Sierre Nevada (1915)

John Peter Buwalda (December 16, 1886 – August 19, 1954) was an American geologist. For over 20 years, he was head of the geological sciences division at the California Institute of Technology. During 1951–52, he was president of the Seismological Society of America.

== Biography ==
He was born in Zeeland, Michigan, the son of Peter John Buwalda and Eva née Takoma. His parents were Frisian immigrants from Witmarsum, Netherlands. The town of Zeeland was originally settled by Dutch immigrants, including the Buwalda family. His family moved to Yakima, Washington in 1897, where Buwalda attended grammar school and graduated from high school in 1905.

He matriculated to University of Washington, where he undertook a broad program of academic study, and Charles E. Weaver introduced him to the field of geology. However, Buwalda did not complete a degree program at that institution. Following the death of a brother, and with a desire for broader experience, after two years of study he took time off. He worked at a newspaper, the Coeur d'Alene mines of Idaho, and as a surveyor for the Northern Pacific Railway in the Cascade Range.

In 1909, Buwalda enrolled at the geology department of the University of California, Berkeley. There he was mentored in paleontology by John C. Merriam and in geology by Andrew C. Lawson. Buwalda was a member of the Sigma Alpha Epsilon fraternity, and received his B.S. with honors in 1912. He performed graduate studies at the same institution, mapping Miocene units in the Tehachapi Range. In 1915, he was awarded a Ph.D. with a dissertation titled, New Mammalian Faunas from Miocene Sediments Near Tehachapi Pass in the Southern Sierre Nevada. Buwalda joined the California Academy of Sciences in 1915 (and was elected a fellow in 1921).

=== Career ===
Buwalda stayed at Berkeley for two more years in the only job then available: teaching meteorology in the department of geography. During this time, he taught physiography, from which he gained a life-long interest in geomorphology. In 1917, he married Berkeley law school graduate Imra Wann, and joined the geology faculty at Yale University as an assistant professor the same year. The couple would have four children: Peter John, May Joan, William John, and Robert John. After the US entered World War 1, Buwalda worked for the United States Geological Survey assessing strategic materials. After four years at Yale, he returned to the University of California in 1921 as associate professor and Dean of Summer Sessions.

In 1925, the Carnegie Corporation voted to grant the California Institute of Technology $25,000 to start a program in geology. Buwalda was invited to head up the school's graduate program in geology, to which he accepted. As chairman of the Division of Geological Sciences, he assembled the program staff, while implementing study and research programs in geology, paleontology, and geophysics. As part of his curriculum, he required undergraduates to take two summer field camps, as well as a year-long field course. Buwalda supervised the addition of two laboratories to the campus, Charles Arms and Seeley W. Mudd, which were dedicated in 1939. As a result of his efforts, during the decade from 1929 to 1939, Caltech ranked sixth in the US in the number of doctorates awarded in the geological sciences.

During World War 2, many of the department staff were away and so Buwalda had to carry much of teaching burden on his own. In addition he was severely ill for a time. In 1947, Buwalda requested to resign his post as chair so that he could spend more time on research. He would continue his teaching duties up until the time of his death.

Besides education, Buwalda led a prominent career as a consultant. From 1928 until 1954, he served on the Yosemite National Park board of advisors. In 1931, he was president of the Cordilleran Section of the Geological Society of America, after serving as treasurer during 1923–1927. For the Metropolitan Water District of Southern California, he performed geological surveys of dams and tunnels for the Colorado River Aqueduct. In San Francisco, he advised on the seismic safety of the East Bay Bridge for the State Highway Division. He spent 30 years working to sway the public in California of the need for earthquake-resistant structures. During 1951–52, he was named president of the Seismological Society of America, succeeding Frank Neumann in the office. Following the 1952 Kern County earthquake, he spent the summer of that year examining the underlying structures and mapping the surface rupture features.

He died in 1954 while on a field trip with his son Robert to Frazier Mountain park in California.

== Publications ==
He contributed to the following publications:

- Gutenberg, Beno; Bulwalda, John P.; Sharp, Robert P. (August 1956), "Seismic explorations on the floor of Yosemite Valley, California", GSA Bulletin, 67 (8): 1051–1078, doi:10.1130/0016-7606(1956)67[1051:SEOTFO]2.0.CO;2.
- Buwalda, John P.; St. Amand, Pierre (November 1955), "Geological effects of the Arvin-Tehachapi earthquake", Bulletin of the California Division of Mines and Geology, 171, California Department of Natural Resources: 41–56.
- Buwalda, J. P. (1954), "Geology of the Tehachapi Mountains, California", Bulletin of the California Division of Mines and Geology, 170, California Division of Mines and Geology: 131–142.
- Steiny, Homer J.; Buwalda, John P. (1953), "Recent California Earthquakes–"Geology"", AAPG Bulletin, 37 (1): 183, doi:10.1306/5CEADBF9-16BB-11D7-8645000102C1865D.
- Buwalda, John P.; St. Amand, Pierre (December 1952), "The Recent Arvin-Tehachapi, Southern California, Earthquake", Science, 116 (3024): 645–650, Bibcode:1952Sci...116..645B, doi:10.1126/science.116.3024.645.
- Buwalda, John P. (March 1951), "Chester Stock (1892-1950)", AAPG Bulletin, 35 (3): 775–78.
- Buwalda, J. P. (1948), "Geologic Faulting in Southern California", Engineering and Science, 11 (2), California Institute of Technology: 15–18.
- Buwalda, J. P. (1938), "Earth History of a Portion of the Pacific Northwest", Cooperation in Research, vol. 501, Carnegie Institution of Washington, pp. 695–710.
- Buwalda, John P.; Gutenberg, Beno (April 1935), "Investigation of Overthrust Faults by Seismic Methods", Science, 81 (2103): 384–386, Bibcode:1935Sci....81..384B, doi:10.1126/science.81.2103.384.
- Buwalda, John P. (April 1934), "William Morris Davis, an Appreciation", The Scientific Monthly, 38 (4): 384–387, Bibcode:1934SciMo..38..384B, JSTOR 15585.
- Gutenberg, B.; Wood, Harry O.; Buwalda, John P. (September 1932), "Experiments testing seismographic methods for determining crustal structure", Bulletin of the Seismological Society of America, 22 (3): 185–246, Bibcode:1932BuSSA..22..185G, doi:10.1785/BSSA0220030185.
- Buwalda, John P.; Layton Stanton, W. (January 1930), "Geological Events in the History of the Indio Hills and the Salton Basin, Southern California", Science, 71 (1830): 104–106, Bibcode:1930Sci....71..104B, doi:10.1126/science.71.1830.104.
- Buwalda, John P. (December 1929), "Nature of the late movements on the Haywards rift, central California", Bulletin of the Seismological Society of America, 19 (4): 187–199, Bibcode:1929BuSSA..19..187B, doi:10.1785/BSSA0190040187.
- Buwalda, John P.; Moore, Bernard N. (June 1929), The Dalles and Hood River Formations, and the Columbia River Gorge, vol. 404, Carnegie institution of Washington, pp. 11–29.
- Buwalda, J. P. (1929), A Neocene Erosion Surface in Central Oregon, vol. 404, Carnegie institution of Washington, pp. 1–10.
- Buwalda, John P.; Moore, Bernard N. (September 1927), "Age of the "Satsop" and the Dalles Formations of Oregon and Washington", Science, 66 (1706): 236, Bibcode:1927Sci....66..236B, doi:10.1126/science.66.1706.236.
- Buwalda, John P. (August 1927), "Paleontological and Geological Investigations in the John Day Region of Eastern Oregon", Science, 66 (1701): 135–136, Bibcode:1927Sci....66..135B, doi:10.1126/science.66.1701.135.
- Buwalda, John P. (1927), "Pleistocene And Recent Topographic Changes In The Pacific Coast States", Transactions, American Geophysical Union, 8 (1): 39–43, Bibcode:1927TrAGU...8...39B, doi:10.1029/TR008i001p00039.
- Buwalda, J. P. (1926), "Geological Conditions Affecting Dams in San Gabriel Canyon", California Tax Digest: 109–10.
- Buwalda, J. P. (January 1926), "Earthquakes and Their Habits in California", The California Monthly: 255–57.
- Buwalda, John P. (December 1924), "The age of the Payette Formation and the old erosion surface in Idaho", Science, 60 (1564): 572–573, Bibcode:1924Sci....60..572B, doi:10.1126/science.60.1564.572.
- Buwalda, John Peter (1921), Report on Oil and Gas Possibilities of Eastern Oregon, Mineral resources of Oregon, vol. 3, The Oregon Bureau of Mines and Geology, p. 2.
- Merriam, John C.; Buwalda, John P. (April 14, 1917), "Age of strata referred to the Ellensburg formation in the White Bluffs of the Columbia River", Bulletin of the Department of Geology, 10 (15), University of California Publications: 255–266.
- Buwalda, John Peter (May 1915), "New Mammalian Faunas from Miocene Sediments Near Tehachapi Pass in the Southern Sierre Nevada", Bulletin of the Department of Geology, 10 (6), University of California Press: 75–85.
