= Byerley =

Byerley is a surname. Notable people with the surname include:

- Julie Story Byerley (born 1970), American physician
- Robert Byerley (1660–1714), English cavalry officer
  - Byerley Turk (c. 1684–1706), a famous English stallion
- Stephen Byerley, fictional character created by Isaac Asimov
- Thomas Byerley (disambiguation), multiple people
