= Perry Byerly =

American geophysicist and seismologist

- Born: May 28, 1897; Clarinda, Iowa
- Died: September 26, 1978 (aged 81); Oakland, California
- Education: Ph.D., University of California, Berkeley
- Spouses: Ardis Gehring (1925–1929); Elsie Gillmor (1932–1940); Lillian Nuckolls (1941–1978)
- Parents: Perry Byerly (father); Pauline Watson (mother)
- Scientific career
- Thesis: Dispersion of Energy Without Dispersion of Frequencies in Transverse Elastic Waves in the Earth (1924)

Perry Byerly Jr. (May 28, 1897 – September 26, 1978) was an American geophysicist and seismologist. He was the first professor of seismology at the University of California, Berkeley, and was named emeritus professor in 1965. By 1969, Byerly was considered "one of the foremost seismologists in the country".

== Biography ==
Byerly was born on May 28, 1897, in Clarinda, Iowa, the son and only child of Perry Byerly Sr. and Pauline Watson. Because of their son's poor health, on the advice of a doctor they moved to California in 1905. Due to frequent relocations, Byerly attended multiple schools before graduating from Redlands High School in 1916. He matriculated to University of Redlands for a year, then transferred to the University of Southern California. After the nation entered World War I, Byerly trained to be a master gunner in the Coast Artillery Corps, first at Fort Winfield Scott in California, then at Fort Monroe in Virginia.

With the war over, Byerly returned to the University of Southern California for his junior year. After deciding to focus on mathematics, Byerly then received the offer of a job as a physics assistant at the University of California, Berkeley, where he spent his final year. In 1921, he graduated with an A.B. in physics and decided to attend graduate school at the same institution. In 1924, as a Whiting fellow in physics, Byerly was awarded a Ph.D. with a thesis titled, Dispersion of Energy Without Dispersion of Frequencies in Transverse Elastic Waves in the Earth.

=== Career ===
After spending a year as a physics instructor at the University of Nevada, Reno, in 1925 he was appointed a geology instructor at the University of California, Berkeley, and director of the institution's seismic station. He took over the job from assistant professor James B. Macelwane, who had left for Missouri. In less than a week, severe earthquakes occurred in Montana and Santa Barbara, and Byerly had to manage the press relations for the station. The man who hired Byerly was Andrew Lawson, and the two men became good friends. The same year he was married to his first wife, Ardis Gehring, and they had a son, Perry Edward.

Byerly was named assistant professor in 1927 at University of California, Berkeley, and he remained on their faculty until 1965. In 1928 he received a Guggenheim Fellowship to study mathematical geophysics at Cambridge, England. This ran for a period of twelve months starting in June 1928. During this study he primarily collaborated with Harold Jeffreys and Beno Gutenberg. The former became a lifetime friend of Byerly. However, in 1929 his wife Ardis died from Hodgkin's disease while in Cambridge. He married his second wife, Elsie Gillmor, in 1932 and they had sons David and Donald. They were divorced in 1940. Byerly married his third wife, Lillian Nuckolls, in 1941.

For many years he was a consultant for various companies, including the Texas Oil Company and Pacific Gas and Electric Company. In 1942 he authored a textbook titled, Seismology. Following the Port Chicago disaster in 1944, the U.S. Navy consulted with Byerly. Using seismometers, Byerly could determine the sequence and timing of the explosions. This analysis later informed work on the detection of nuclear weapons testing as part of the Comprehensive Test Ban Treaty.

He was elected to the National Academy of Sciences in 1946. The same year he became chair of the Berkeley Department of Geology, and remained so until 1954. In 1952, he was Condon lecturer in Oregon and was named to his second Guggenheim fellowship. He was the Smith-Mundt lecturer at the University of New Mexico in 1954. During the International Geophysical Year (1957–1958), Byerly was named chair for the Panel on Seismology and Gravity. He served as secretary of Seismological Society of America from 1931 until 1956, and was elected president in 1957. From September 1960 to June 1961 he was a lecturer at the University of Cambridge for the Fulbright U.S. Scholar Program. He was named emeritus professor at Berkeley in 1965. In 1976, Byerly was the first recipient of the Society Medal, awarded by the Seismological Society of America. This medal is now called the Harry Fielding Reid Medal.

=== Research ===
By the time of his retirement from Berkeley, the number of seismic stations managed by the university had increased from two to sixteen, including the first network to be monitored over a telephone line. During his career, Byerly researched topics in seismology including the structure of the Earth particularly near California, the focal mechanism of earthquakes, and the theory of the seismograph itself. He was able to establish a root existed under the southern Sierra Nevada mountain range that caused a delay in seismic waves passing through it. Byerly found a method of using the direction of the initial motion on a seismograph to compute the types of forces acting as the source of an earthquake. In studying P-wave travel-time curve of the Montana earthquake in 1926, he discovered a 20-degree discontinuity. He determined how much elastic energy is released when a fault breaks.

== Awards and honors ==
- Two Guggenheim Fellowships (1928 and 1952)
- Condon lecturer, Oregon (1952)
- Smith-Mundt lecturer, University of Mexico (1954)
- Fulbright program lecturer (1960–1961)
- Honorary LL.D. from University of California, Berkeley (1966)
- The seismographic station on the Berkeley campus is named after him
- Mount Byerly in Antarctica is named after him
