= Paul G. Richards =

American seismologist

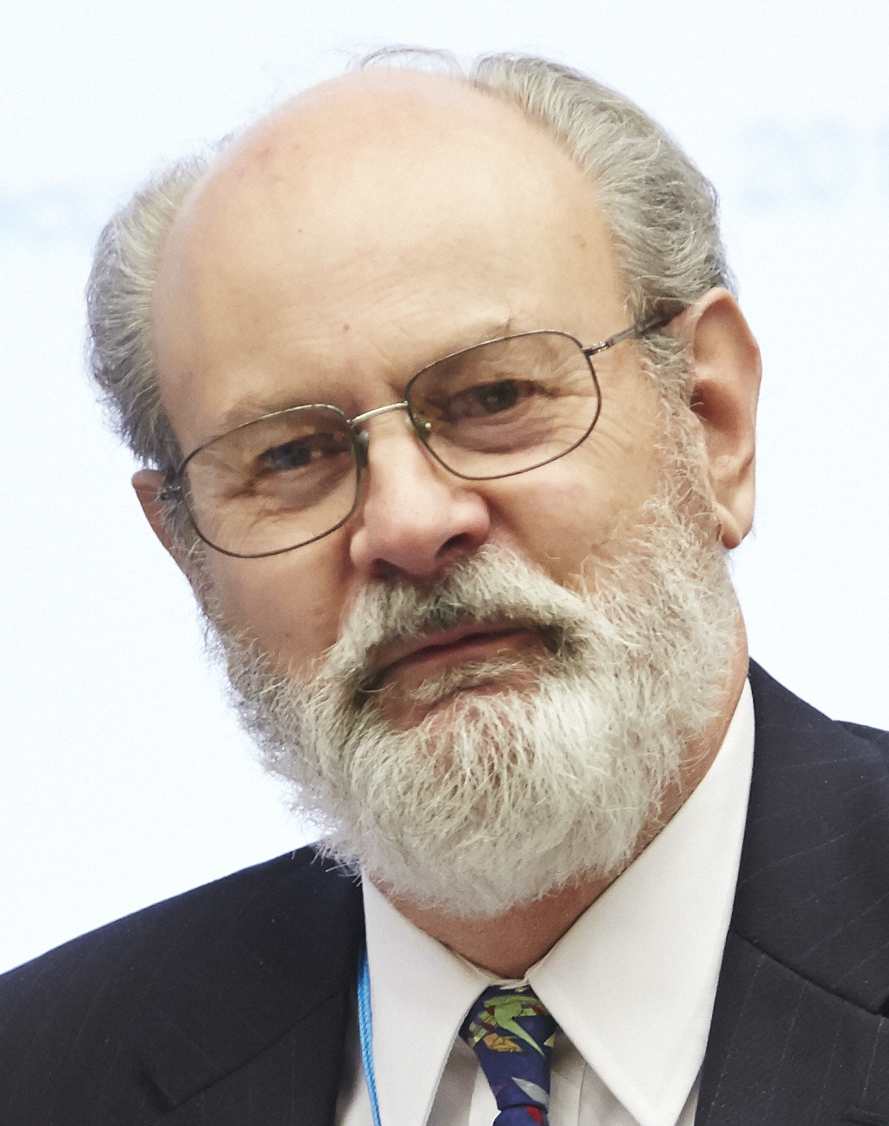
- Born: March 1943 (age 83); England
- Education: University of Cambridge (B.A.); California Institute of Technology (M.S., Ph.D.)
- Known for: Theory of seismic wave propagation
- Scientific career
- Fields: Seismology; Geology; Geophysics
- Workplaces: Columbia University

Paul G. Richards (born March 1943) is an English-born, American seismologist who has made fundamental contributions to the theory of seismic wave propagation and in methods to understand how the recorded shapes of seismic waves are affected by processes of diffraction, attenuation and scattering. He is the Mellon Professor of the Natural Sciences at Lamont–Doherty Earth Observatory of Columbia University.

== Education ==
Richards was born in England and attended Cambridge University where he earned his Bachelor of Arts (B.A.) in Mathematics in 1965 and Caltech where he earned his Master of Science (M.S.) in Geology in 1966 and his Doctor of Philosophy (Ph.D.) in Geophysics in 1970. His thesis title was, "A contribution to the theory of high frequency elastic waves, with applications to the shadow boundary of the Earth's core."

== Academic career ==
From 1979 to 1996, Richards was Professor of Geological Sciences, Columbia University and from 1996 to present, he is Professor of Earth and Environmental Sciences, Columbia University. Since 1997, he has been the Mellon Professor of the Natural Sciences, Columbia University. He has taken a number of academic leaves, including years in Washington working on nuclear arms control in the U.S. Department of State, and four sabbaticals taken in New Zealand, at Lawrence Livermore National Laboratory, Los Alamos National Laboratory, and as a Phi Beta Kappa lecturer.

He co-authored with Keiiti Aki "Quantitative Seismology: theory and methods". He is the author of more than 130 peer-reviewed publications. He has an H-index of 21. His most cited publications are Song and Richards (1996) (199 citations) and Richards and Menke (1983) (169 citations).

== Honors ==
His professional memberships include the Seismological Society of America, Society of Exploration Geophysicists, Royal Astronomical Society, American Geophysical Union (Fellow since 1977), Arms Control Association, American Association for the Advancement of Science (Fellow since 1993), Council on Foreign Relations, International Society of Explosives Engineers, and American Academy of Arts and Sciences (Fellow). He is involved in nuclear explosion monitoring and arms control has been a member of the Seismic Review Panel (SRP) for the U.S. Air Force Technical Applications Center (AFTAC) from 1985 to present. Richards received the Harry Fielding Reid medal of the Seismological Society of America in 2010.

== Important publications ==
- Song, X., and P.G. Richards (1996), Seismological evidence for differential rotation of the Earth's inner core, Nature, 382, 221-224.
- Richards, P.G. and W. Menke (1983), The apparent attenuation of a scattering medium, Bull. Seism. Soc. Amer., 73, 1005-1021.
- Keiiti Aki, Paul G. Richards (2002), Quantitative Seismology: Theory and Methods, University Science Books, 2002, ISBN 0-935702-96-2, ISBN 978-0-935702-96-5, 700 pages.
