= Jean-Paul Montagner =

Jean-Paul Montagner is a French seismologist and University of Paris professor. He won a Inge Lehmann Medal in 2021 and a Beno Gutenberg Medal from the European Geosciences Union.
