= Mount Macelwane =

Mountain in Ellsworth Land, Antarctica

Mount Macelwane (81°54′S 89°30′W) is the highest peak in the eastern part of the Nash Hills of Antarctica. The peak was positioned by the U.S. Ellsworth–Byrd Traverse Party on 14 December 1958, and named for Reverend James B. Macelwane, S.J., first chairman of the Technical Panel for Seismology and Gravity of the U.S. National Committee for the International Geophysical Year, as set up by the National Academy of Sciences. It lies within the Chilean Antarctic Territory.

== See also ==
- Mountains in Antarctica
