= Hitoshi Kawakatsu =

Hitoshi Kawakatsu is a Japanese seismologist and University of Tokyo professor. He won a Beno Gutenberg Medal from the European Geosciences Union in 2017 and a Inge Lehmann Medal in 2025. He is a fellow of the American Geophysical Union.
