= Donald E. Hudson =

American earthquake engineer (1916–1999)

- Born: February 25, 1916; Alma, Michigan, U.S.
- Died: April 24, 1999 (aged 83); Pasadena, California
- Education: California Institute of Technology
- Spouse: Phyllis Henderson Hudson
- Engineering career
- Discipline: earthquake engineering
- Employer: California Institute of Technology
- Awards: National Academy of Engineering, Fellow American Society of Mechanical Engineers, Fellow American Association for the Advancement of Science, Fellow American Society of Civil Engineers, Fellow American Geophysical Union, Honorary Member Earthquake Engineering Research Institute, ASCE’s Nathan M. Newmark Medal (1989), George W. Housner Medal by EERI (1992)

Donald Ellis Hudson (February 25, 1916 – April 24, 1999) was an American earthquake engineer and academic. He was a professor at the California Institute of Technology in the Division of Engineering and Applied Science (1943-1981), where he performed pioneering research in ground motion measurement and analysis, and response of structures to earthquake excitation. Hudson developed or co-developed a number of instruments used in the study and analysis of seismic motions. With Thomas K. Caughey he developed the Mark II response spectrum analyzer in the late 1950s, and then worked with Lehner & Griffith Company (which was acquired by United Electro Dynamics Inc.) to develop the AR-240 accelerograph, the first “off-the-shelf” commercially available accelerograph. He was elected in 1973 to the National Academy of Engineering "For the development of widely used instruments to record destructive earthquake ground shaking". He was also a fellow of the American Society of Mechanical Engineers, and served as president of the International Association for Earthquake Engineering (IAEE).

== Early life ==
Donald E. Hudson was born in Alma, Michigan and grew up in Pasadena, California. He graduated from Pasadena High School and began his college education at Pasadena City College. In 1936, he transferred to the California Institute of Technology (Caltech), where earned his BS (1938), MS (1939), and PhD (1942, Mechanical Engineering) under the supervision of Dr. Frederick C. Lindvall.

While still a student, he performed geophysical exploration for General Petroleum Corporation. For six months in 1942, he worked as an engineer in aircraft vibration for Douglas Aircraft. He then returned to Caltech and worked under the direction of Dr. Lindvall on projects related to rocketry and underwater ordnance development through the U.S. Navy's Office of Research and Inventions.

== Career ==
In 1943, he became an assistant professor at Caltech, an associate professor in 1949, and a professor in 1955.

=== Educational Contributions ===
In the late 1940s George W. Housner and Hudson wrote two important textbooks that became the basis of the applied mechanics curriculum at Caltech. Hudson and Housner’s interest in earthquake engineering led to the development of a three-course earthquake engineering sequence: experimental techniques of earthquake engineering, geophysical background of earthquake engineering, and structural issues, codes and regulations.

In 1958, Hudson was sponsored by the Technical Cooperation Mission of the U.S. State Department to work at what is now the Indian Institute of Technology, Roorkee, where in collaboration with Jai Krishna he developed a dynamics measurement laboratory and helped establish an earthquake engineering curriculum. (Note: Details on this cooperative program between Caltech and IIT, Roorkee is provided in Jain, Sudhir (2008). "Historical Developments in India Towards Seismic Safety and Lessons for Future" (PDF). Proc. 14th World Conference on Earthquake Engineering. Beijing, China.) The development of the lab and a longer term cooperative relationship with Caltech, served as the foundation for the School of Research and Training in Earthquake Engineering (now the Department of Earthquake Engineering) at IIT, Roorkee.

=== Research ===
Hudson’s research was in the areas of mechanics, dynamics and instrumentation. Hudson and Thomas K. Caughey developed the C. I. T. Mark II Response Spectrum Analyzer in the late 1950s. He and Housner worked with Robert E. Griffith of Lehner & Griffith Company (which was acquired by United Electro Dynamics Inc.), and with the support of Robert Swain developed the AR-240 accelerograph, which in 1963 was the first “off-the-shelf” commercially available accelerograph. Hudson and Romeo R. Martel developed vibration generators for full-scale testing of structures and determination of modes of vibration.

Hudson's research advanced the analysis of strong-motion accelerograph records. As a result of the installation of the Southern California strong-motion earthquake instrumentation network, the 1971 San Fernando earthquake generated 241 strong motion accelerograms, creating what was at the time the largest set of strong-motion records from a single earthquake in history. Hudson, with the support from the National Science Foundation, the National Oceanic and Atmospheric Administration, his graduate students and others at the Caltech Earthquake Engineering Research Laboratory, digitized, plotted and cataloged all of the records from this earthquake. To process the large number of records, an automated digitization process was developed. Significantly, all records were made publicly available, serving as the basis of a standardized database of archived earthquake records that would be augmented in later earthquakes.

He retired from Caltech with Emeritus status in 1981. He served as the chair of the Department of Civil Engineering at University of Southern California (1981-1984), where he held the Fred Champion Professorship in Civil Engineering, and then returned to Caltech as Professor Emeritus.

== Professional Activities ==
He served as president of the IAEE (1980-1984), president of the Seismological Society of America (1971-1972), and on the Board of Directors of EERI (1966-1968).

== Awards ==
Hudson was elected to the U.S. National Academy of Engineering in 1973 and the Indian National Academy of Engineering in 1987. He was a Fellow of the American Society of Mechanical Engineers, the American Association for the Advancement of Science, the American Society of Civil Engineers, the American Geophysical Union, and an Honorary member of the Earthquake Engineering Research Institute (EERI). He was awarded Nathan M. Newmark Medal (1989) by the American Society of Civil Engineers (ASCE), and the George W. Housner Medal by EERI (1992).
