= Jay Backus Woodworth =

American geologist and educator

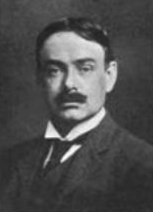
- Woodworth in a 1914 publication
- Born: January 2, 1865; Newfield, New York
- Died: August 4, 1925 (aged 60)
- Education: Harvard University, B.S. in geology
- Spouse: Geneva Downs
- Children: Ethel
- Parents: Allen Beach Woodworth (father); Amanda Smith (mother)

Jay Backus Woodworth (January 2, 1865 – August 4, 1925) was an American geologist and educator. He was one of several American pioneers in the scientific study of earthquakes, and he became a recognized authority on glacial geology in New England.

== Biography ==
Woodworth was born in Newfield, New York on January 2, 1865, the son of Reverend Allen Beach Woodworth and Amanda née Smith. As a youth he developed a love of nature and an interest in the geology of New York.

After a few years working in business, he matriculated to the Lawrence Scientific School of Harvard University to begin technical training. Nathaniel Shaler chose Woodworth as his personal assistant for a lengthy study of the coast of New England. In 1890 Woodworth was appointed a geology assistant, and he became associated with the United States Geological Survey. He was promoted to instructor in geology in 1893. The following year he was awarded a B.S. degree in geology, cum laude. Woodworth continued to teach at Harvard, becoming assistant professor in 1901.

From 1904 until 1908 he was chairman in charge of the department of geology and geography at Harvard. Woodworth was placed in charge of establishing and maintaining the Harvard Seismographic Station in 1908, and he would become noted for his accurate and meticulous record keeping. For eight months in 1908, he took a leave of absence to lead the first Shaler Memorial Expedition to South America. This geological expedition studied glacial phenomenon in Brazil and traced changes to the shoreline in Chile. Woodworth was named a Fellow of the Geological Society of America in 1896, becoming a counselor during 1910–1912. He was elected to the American Academy of Arts and Sciences in 1910.

On January 21, 1911, the Cambridge Tribune reported that Mrs. Geneva Downs Woodworth, the wife of Jay B. Woodworth, had died at her home at the age of 44. She was survived by her husband and daughter. There is no mention of the marriage in Woodworth's obituary.

Woodworth was named associate professor at Harvard in 1912. During 1915–1919 he was engaged by the U.S. Geological Survey on a survey of S.E. Massachusetts. He was elected president of the Seismological Society of America, 1916–1917. When the country entered World War I, he chaired the sub-committee on the use of seismographs in war for the National Research Council. Following the war, Woodworth was a geologist for the U.S. Geological Survey.

After a lengthy illness, Woodworth died on August 4, 1925. He was survived by his daughter Ethel. A Harvard graduate fellowship in geology was established in his memory, largely based on contributions by his former students.
