= Christopher H. Scholz =

American geologist and physicist (born 1943)

- Born: 25 February 1943 (age 83)
- Education: University of Nevada; Massachusetts Institute of Technology
- Awards: Murchison Medal (2005); Harry Fielding Reid Medal (2015)
- Scientific career
- Fields: Earth science
- Workplaces: Columbia University

Christopher H. Scholz (born 25 February 1943) is an American geologist and physicist. He is Professor Emeritus of Earth and Environmental Sciences and of Applied Physics and Applied Mathematics at Columbia University and the Lamont–Doherty Earth Observatory.

== Biography ==
Scholz received his B.S. in geological engineering from the University of Nevada in 1964 and his Ph.D. from the Massachusetts Institute of Technology in 1967. He joined the staff of Lamont-Doherty Earth Observatory in 1968 and was appointed professor in 1977.

Scholz was among the first to combine physics and geological engineering to understand the movement of tectonic plates and earthquakes.

In 1970, Scholz proposed the dilatancy-diffusion model of earthquake prediction that allowed seismologists to study the geophysical effects in rock observed before and during an earthquake. His work also enabled researchers to create regional seismic hazard maps that derives spatial and size distributions of earthquakes from geological observations.

Scholz was elected to the National Academy of Engineering in 2023 "for pioneering experimental and theoretical studies on faulting and earthquake mechanics."

Scholz is also the author of the popular textbook The Mechanics of Earthquakes and Faulting.

== Awards ==
Scholz was awarded the Murchison Medal from the Geological Society of London in 2005 and the Harry Fielding Reid Medal from the Seismological Society of America in 2015. He was a Sloan Research Fellow in 1975–77.
