= Glen Lukens =

Glen William Lukens (1887–1967) was an American ceramicist, glassmaker, and jewelry designer born in Missouri. He is best known for his innovative work with glazes and his contributions to modernist jewelry. Lukens helped pave the way for ceramics today as an awarding winning ceramicist and teacher. Lukens was influential in the Pottery Movement and challenged the American Pottery industry's traditions of design, function, and decoration in the 1930s.

== Early life and early career ==
Glen Lukens was born in Cowgill, Missouri in 1887.

He moved to Los Angeles, California to live and work in 1924. He had previously taught high school classes in Fullerton, California before becoming a professor at University of Southern California where he founded the ceramics program in 1933 and taught metalwork in the architecture school. He spent eight years of his life searching for alkaline metals in the Mojave Desert that would help him discover and create a new blue glaze.

== Career ==
Lukens' main focus was in glazes and colors because he tended to use molds to make his actual clay bodies. He developed several new glazes and techniques, and was a leader in working with new rough clay designs. After the time he spent in the desert, Lukens began to incorporate rough coarse textures that represented the different elements of the desert like fossilized wood, clay, and rock formations. People had grown fond of Luken's work especially in dinnerware.

Lukens later spent fifteen years as a writer and illustrator for the magazine Popular Ceramics. He was also a member of the Art Teachers Association of Southern California. Lukens currently has an award in his name (Glen Lukens Award) at the University of Southern California's School of Fine Arts.

== Techniques ==
- Defects in surface glazes
- Bright colors
- Contrasting elegant pieces with spontaneity
- Raw surfaces
- Unique designs
- Expressive art forms
