= Thomas K. Caughey =

American engineer (1927–2004)

Thomas Kirk Caughey (1927 – December 7, 2004) was an American engineer and leader in the fields of dynamics and vibrations, fluid-induced forces in turbomachinery, stochastic nonlinear systems, and structural monitoring and active control of large structures. He was academic who served as a professor of applied mechanics at the California Institute of Technology. His awards include the Norman Medal in 1999 and the Theodore von Kármán Prize in 2002, both from the American Society of Civil Engineers. The American Society of Mechanical Engineers Thomas K. Caughey Dynamics Award, which was established in 2008, is named after him.

== Biography ==
Born in Rutherglen, Scotland, Caughey graduated with a bachelor's degree in 1948 from the University of Glasgow. From 1947–1951 he worked at Jas. Howden & Co. in Glasgow where he devised an automatic machining system for a new type of rotary compressor. Later, he moved to the United States as a Fulbright scholar and attended Cornell University, where he earned an MS Mechanical Engineering in 1952. In 1954, he completed his PhD from Caltech.

Caughey started his career as an instructor at Caltech in 1953 and later served as a professor of applied mathematics and mechanical engineering between 1955 and 1996.

In 1994, he became the Richard L. and Dorothy M. Hayman Professor of Mechanical Engineering and served until 2004.

He worked with fellow professor Donald E. Hudson to develop the C. I. T. MARK II Response Spectrum Analyzer, which was displayed at the Second World conference on Earthquake Engineering in Tokyo in 1960.

Caughey died on December 7, 2004, at the age of 77.
