= George W. Housner =

American engineer (1910–2008)

- Born: December 9, 1910; Saginaw, Michigan
- Died: November 10, 2008 (aged 97); Pasadena, California
- Education: University of Michigan BSc 1933; California Institute of Technology MSc 1934, PhD 1941
- Known for: Seismological Society of America president (1977)
- Scientific career
- Fields: Civil engineering
- Workplaces: California Institute of Technology

George W. Housner (December 9, 1910 in Saginaw, Michigan – November 10, 2008 in Pasadena, California) was a professor of earthquake engineering at the California Institute of Technology and National Medal of Science laureate.

== Biography ==
Housner received his bachelor's degree in civil engineering from the University of Michigan where he was influenced by Stephen Timoshenko. He earned his master's (1934) and doctoral (1941) degrees from the California Institute of Technology (Caltech). After receiving his master's degree, Housner worked as a structural designer in the Los Angeles area. He returned to Caltech begin his doctoral studies in fall 1939, advised by professor Romeo Raoul Martel. His dissertation was titled "An Investigation of the Effects of Earthquakes on Buildings." He became a professor of earthquake engineering at Caltech from 1945 to 1981, and professor emeritus thereafter. His doctoral students included Robert D. Hanson. In 2000, he received an honorary Doctor of Science from the University of Southern California.

Housner was actively involved with the Earthquake Engineering Research Institute (EERI). He served as the organization's vice president in 1949, then as president from 1950 to 1965. His actions as president included advocating for increased governmental funding for the Seismological Field Survey, a unit of the U.S. Coast and Geodetic Survey, and collaborating with the California Division of Architecture to use shaking machines to study the dynamic properties of buildings. Beyond his tenure as president, Housner also chaired the EERI committee on an NSF-funded monograph series Engineering Monographs on Earthquake Criteria, Structural Design, and Strong Motion Records, for which he also authored Earthquake Design Criteria of Structures (1977) with Paul Jennings. In the 1990s, he also participated in the World Seismic Safety Initiative, an International Association for Earthquake Engineering initiative approved as an International and Regional International Decade for Natural Disaster Reduction Project. Annually, in recognition of those who made extraordinary contributions to the earthquake safety research, practices and policies, EERI awards the George W. Housner Medal. On his death, Housner left a substantial gift to EERI "to advance the objectives of EERI." This gift has been used to train future earthquake engineering policy advocates and thought leaders through the EERI Housner Fellows Program, which has been active since 2011.

Housner's research and contributions to the field of earthquake engineering span strong motion earthquake analysis, development of earthquake design spectra, and the effect of fluid sloshing on liquid storage tanks. His published journal articles include "Behavior of Structures During Earthquakes" in the Journal of Engineering Mechanics (1959) and "The Mechanism of Sandblows" in the Bulletin of the Seismological Society of America (1958). He also co-authored the textbooks Applied Mechanics – Statics (1949, with Donald E. Hudson), Applied Mechanics – Dynamics (1950, also with Hudson), and The Analysis of Stress and Deformation (1966, with Thad Vreeland). Several of his written works have been compiled in Selected Earthquake Engineering Papers of George W. Housner (1990).

Beyond the above-mentioned textbooks, Housner's other collaborations with Donald Hudson included spearheading the creation of the Universities Council on Earthquake Engineering Research in the late 1960s, which eventually evolved into the California Universities for Research in Earthquake Engineering (CUREe), and hosting a wind engineering research conference around 1970 with funding from the National Science Foundation.

Housner's involvement in post-earthquake investigations spanned many events and topics. He acted as chairman of the Engineering Committee of the National Academy of Sciences project to prepare a report on the earthquake in Alaska that occurred in spring 1964 and studied soil liquefaction after the 1964 earthquake in Niigata, Japan. He was appointed to the Los Angeles County's earthquake investigation commission after the 1971 San Fernando earthquake, where Housner advocated for measures to address the hazard posed by unreinforced masonry buildings. After the Loma Prieta earthquake, Housner worked with California's then-governor George Deukmejian to organize and chair a Board of Inquiry to prepare a fact-finding report. Caltrans followed this Board's recommendations to establish a Caltrans seismic advisory board; Housner became the board's chairman and participated until 1995.

Housner consulted on a wide variety of projects throughout his career. Some recurring areas on which he consulted include the following:

- Seismic design for transportation infrastructure and systems: Housner served as a seismic consultant for the rail traffic tube for the original Bay Area Rapid Transit system in the 1950s (as well as extensions into the East Bay and the San Francisco airport in the 1990s) and the Tagus River Suspension Bridge in Portugal. Housner also developed an interest in the performance of dams during his consultancy with California's Department of Water Resources for the Feather River project and State Water Project. He also chaired committees to prepare seismic design criteria for the Port of Los Angeles's Project 2020 and a high-speed rail line in Taiwan.
- Seismic design of oil-related infrastructure: In the 1950s, Housner consulted on the design of the Trans-Arabian Pipeline to carry oil from the Persian Gulf to the Mediterranean and an oil pipeline across Lake Maricaibo in Venezuela. He also undertook the seismic design of several offshore drilling platforms (including a Chevron platform near Santa Barbara in the 1960s, Exxon's Hondo platform, and a drilling platform near Indonesia).
- Nuclear power plants and tests: These included the Pacific Gas and Electric Company's proposed plant at Bodega Bay around 1960 and nuclear testing safety for the Atomic Energy Commission. Housner also wrote the earthquake engineering portion of an Atomic Energy Commission handbook, Nuclear Reactors and Earthquakes, published in 1963.
- Dynamics of stands to test rockets: Housner performed studies for a stand at the Air Force test center in Mississippi and a centrifugal pump for a liquid fuel rocket for Aerojet Corporation.

Other projects included consulting on the design of the Union Bank Building in Los Angeles for the Connecticut General Insurance Company (one of the earliest complete seismic design modeling efforts for a tall building), and serving as a member of the advisory committee to the State of California's Office of Strong Motion Studies.

Housner died of natural causes on November 10, 2008 in Pasadena, California at the age of 97.

== Partial list of achievements ==
- Chairman of the earthquake engineering research committee of the National Academy of Sciences
- Founding Member of the Earthquake Engineering Research Institute
- UNESCO representative to International Institute of Seismology and Earthquake Engineering in Tokyo
- AEC advisory panel on safety against ground shock
- AID consultant at University of Roorkee, India
- Chairman of Geologic Hazards Advisory Committee for Organization for the California State Resources Agency
- Chairman of Panel on Aseismic Design and Testing of Nuclear Facilities for International Atomic Energy Agency
- Member of Los Angeles County Earthquake Commission
- Member of Earthquake Engineering and Hazards Reduction Delegation to People's Republic of China, 1978
- Consultant to Japanese Atomic Energy Commission and Italian Nuclear Energy Commission and numerous nuclear energy projects in the U.S.
- International Association for Earthquake Engineering (IAEE) President, 1969–1973
- Elected to the National Academy of Sciences, 1972
- Named Braun Professor of Engineering at Caltech, 1974
- Chairman of Earthquake Earthquake Engineering Committee and the Committee on Dam Safety of the National Research Council (NRC)
- Delivered second Mallet-Milne memorial lecture for Society for Earthquake and Civil Engineering Dynamics in London, 1989
- President of Seismological Society of America
- Received National Medal of Science, 1978
