= William H. K. Lee =

Chinese-American seismologist (1940–2022)

- Born: William Hung Kang Lee; October 6, 1940; Quiping, Guangxi, China
- Died: c. November 2022 (Note: A paper published by IASPEI stated he died "late November 2022" though another online seismology source published on December 11 claimed he had passed away the previous week.)
- Other names: Willie H. K. Lee; W. H. K. Lee
- Education: University of Alberta (BS); University of California, Los Angeles (PhD)
- Awards: IASPEI Medal (2015)
- Scientific career
- Fields: Seismology
- Institutions: U.S. Geological Survey

William Hung Kang Lee (Note: Also spelled Hung Kan Lee.) (1940 – 2022) was a seismologist affiliated with the U.S. Geological Survey and an elected fellow of the American Geophysical Union. He was an expert on the application of personal computers on monitoring seismic events; the "Willie Lee System" of recording seismicity on computer networks is named for him. A two-park book he edited, the International Handbook of Earthquake and Engineering Seismology (Academic Press, 2003–2003) received multiple scholarly reviews.

Born during wartime in Quiping, Guangxi, China, on October 6, 1940, Lee's family fled to Macau in 1950 and Hong Kong in 1952. He attended the University of Alberta in Canada, where he received a B.S. degree in physics and geology in 1962, and later the University of California, Los Angeles, from which he attained a Ph.D. in planetary and space physics in 1967.

During his life, he held several posts within the International Association of Seismology and Physics of the Earth's Interior, including service on the Commission on Practice in the late 1980s, and work as chair of the Working Group on Personal Computers during the year 1989. He was also the editor of the IASPEI Software Library, published in multiple volumes from 1989 to 1993, and chairman of the Committee on Education from 1995 to 2001. He is mentioned as an important figure in the official IASPEI brochure.

Lee joined the Geological Survey at Menlo Park, California, in 1967, and retired to become a scientist emeritus around 1995 or 1996. In 2006, the USGS awarded Lee the Dallas Peck Outstanding Emeritus Award. (Note: Source: U.S. Geological Survey. See also: Dallas Peck.) He was unanimously picked by the IASPEI Bureau to win the 2015 IASPEI Medal.

He died in circa November 2022.
