= Zumberge Hall of Science =

Building in California, United States

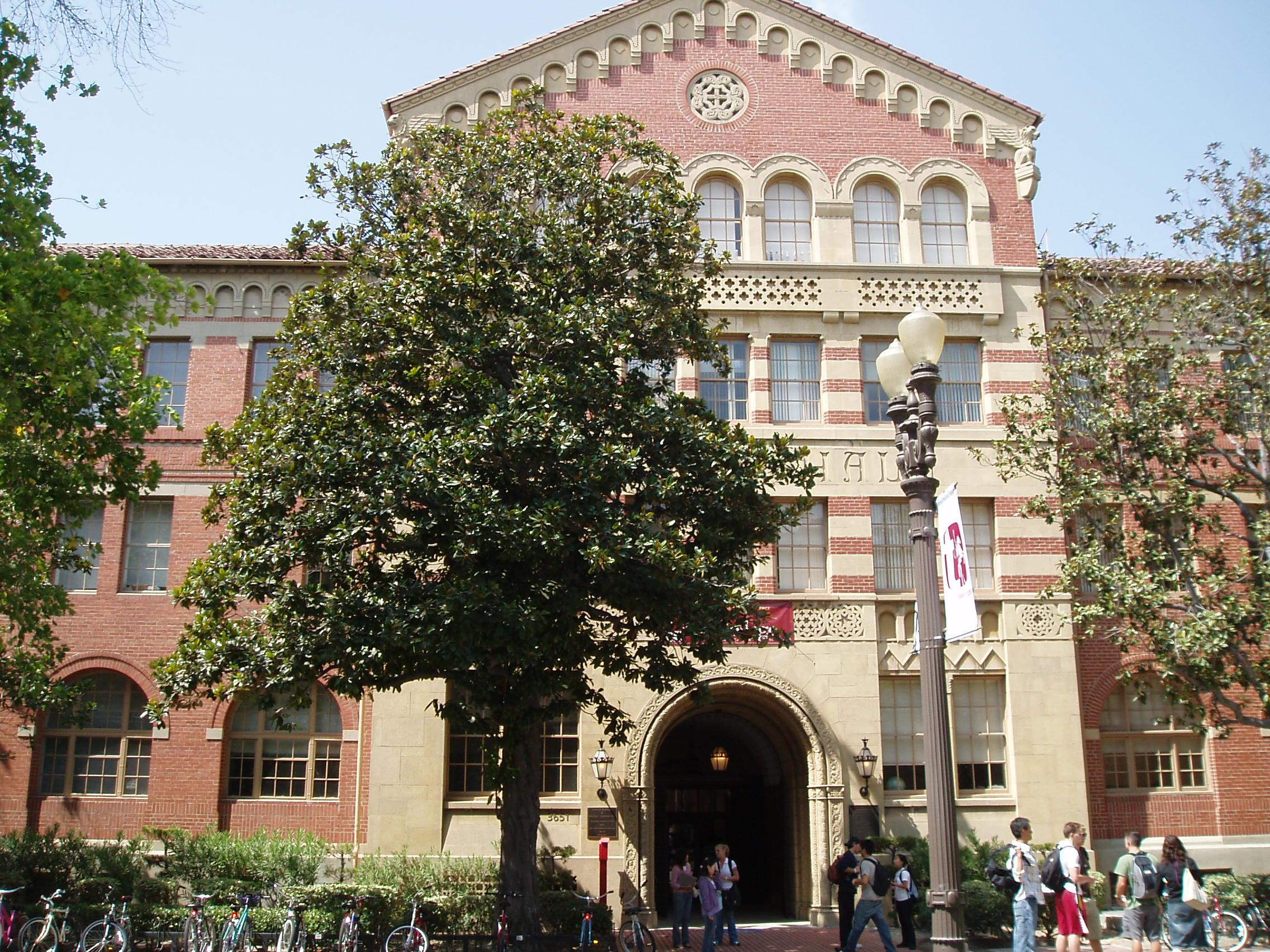
- Zumberge Hall of Science
- Interactive map of the Zumberge Hall of Science area

General information
- Type: Academic
- Architectural style: Romanesque Revival
- Location: Los Angeles, CA, United States
- Coordinates: 34.019159°N 118.286405°W
- Elevation: 63 m (207 ft)
- Completed: 1928

Technical details
- Lifts/elevators: 2

Design and construction
- Architecture firm: John and Donald Parkinson

Zumberge Hall of Science, commonly known as ZHS, is one of the original buildings of the University of Southern California's University Park Campus, completed in 1928.

== Science Hall ==
Originally known as "Science Hall" it was renamed in 2003 to honor the passing of former USC president and professor of geology, James Zumberge. Today, ZHS is home to USC's department of Earth Sciences as well as the Southern California Earthquake Center.

== Architecture ==
The building was designed in the Romanesque Revival style by architects John and Donald Parkinson. They are the father-and-son architectural team that also designed the Los Angeles Memorial Coliseum and Los Angeles City Hall. Romanesque detailing includes cast stone pendants below the roofline and cast-stone gargoyles at the building's corners.

In the building's arcade is a mural depicting four youths in scientific contemplation, a Masters in Fine Arts project by Jean Goodwin Ames under the direction of Glen Lukens in 1937. Ames is notable for many murals she created with her husband for the Works Progress Administration (WPA) during the Great Depression.
