= International Association of Seismology and Physics of the Earth's Interior =

International non-governmental organization

- Abbreviation: IASPEI
- Formation: 1922
- Type: INGO
- Region served: Worldwide
- Official language: English
- President: Kenji Satake, Japan
- Parent organization: International Union of Geodesy and Geophysics
- Website: IASPEI Official website

The International Association of Seismology and Physics of the Earth's Interior (IASPEI) is an international organization promoting the study of earthquakes and other seismic sources, the propagation of seismic waves, and the internal structure, properties and processes of the Earth.

IASPEI is one of eight associations of the International Union of Geodesy and Geophysics (IUGG). IASPEI initiates and co-ordinates international researches and scientific discussion on scientific and applied seismology.

The activities of IASPEI focus on the societal impacts of earthquakes and tsunamis, with four regional commissions promoting high standards of seismological education, outreach and international scientific cooperation.

== IASPEI Commissions ==
- Commission on Education and Outreach
- Commission on Seismological Observation and Interpretation (CoSOI)
- Commission on Tectonophysics and Crustal Structure
- Commission on Earthquake Generation Process - Physics, Modelling, and Monitoring for Forecast
- Commission on Earth Structure and Geodynamics
- Commission on Earthquake Hazard, Risk and Strong Ground Motion (SHR)
- Commission on Earthquake Source Mechanics (ESM)

=== IASPEI Regional Commissions ===
- European Seismological Commission (ESC)
- Asian Seismological Commission (ASC)
- African Seismological Commission (AfSC)
- Latin American and Caribbean Seismological Commission (LACSC)

== History ==
In 1899, a Permanent Seismological Commission was created at the Seventh International Congress of Geography in Berlin, and in 1903 at subsequent conference in Strasbourg, the International Seismological Association (ISA) was founded. On 1 April 1904, the ISA convention entered into force with 18 founding member-states with a plan to continue during next 12 years.

In 1922, ISA became one of constituent Sections of International Union of Geodesy and Geophysics (IUGG), taking its present name - International Association of Seismology and Physics of the Earth's Interior (IASPEI) – at the IX IUGG General Assembly in 1951 in Bruxelles.

== IASPEI Management ==
Management of the organization is dealt by bureau that consists of President, 1st and 2nd vice-presidents, as well as Secretary-General/Treasurer. The Bureau is responsible to the executive committee consisting of nine members. Current IASPEI President is Kenji Satake (Japan).

== The IASPEI Medal ==
IASPEI medal is being awarded since 2011 for sustaining IASPEI goals and activities and for scientific merits in for scientific merits in the field of seismology and physics of the Earth's interior.

Winners are:

- 2021: Barbara Romanowicz
- 2019: Brian Kennett
- 2017: Eric Robert Engdahl
- 2015: Willie H. K. Lee
- 2013: Robin Adams
