= Bulletin of the Seismological Society of America =

- Discipline: Seismology
- Language: English
- Edited by: Thomas Pratt

Publication details
- History: 1911–present
- Publisher: Seismological Society of America (USA)
- Frequency: Bimonthly
- Impact factor: 2.146 (2017)

Standard abbreviations
- ISO 4: Bull. Seismol. Soc. Am.

Indexing
- CODEN: BSSAAP
- ISSN: 1943-3573 (print); 0037-1106 (web)
- LCCN: 13010025
- OCLC no.: 1604335

Links
- Journal homepage; Archive (1911-present); Current issue

Bulletin of the Seismological Society of America (BSSA) is a bimonthly peer reviewed scientific journal published by the Seismological Society of America. The editor-in-chief is Thomas Pratt (U. S. Geological Survey). The journal covers seismology and related disciplines. Topical coverage includes theory and observation of seismic waves, specific earthquakes, the structure of the Earth, earthquake sources, hazard and risk estimation, and earthquake engineering. Publishing formats include regular papers and short notes. Publication has been continuous since 1911.

== Abstracting and indexing ==
This journal is indexed by the following services:

- Science Citation Index
- Current Contents / Physical, Chemical & Earth Sciences
- Chemical Abstracts Service
- Applied Science & Technology Index
- Coal Abstracts (International Energy Agency)
- International Aerospace Abstracts
- GeoRef
- Computer & Control Abstracts
- Electrical & Electronics Abstracts
- Physics Abstracts. Science Abstracts. Series A
- Energy Research Abstracts

== Notes ==
- Note: An apparent alternate title is "Seismological Society of America, Bulletin" with the abbreviation "Seismol. Soc. Am., Bull."
- Note: the value of impact factor is tentative, and may be needing a reliable source. Found 2012 impact factor here.
