= Brian Kennett =

Mathematical physicist and seismologist

Professor Brian Kennett AO FRS FAA

Professor of Seismology, Australian National University
- In office 1984–2016

Personal details
- Born: Brian Leslie Norman Kennett; 7 May 1948 (age 78) Croydon, Surrey, England

Brian Leslie Norman Kennett (born 7 May 1948 in Croydon, Surrey, UK) is a British mathematical physicist and seismologist. He is now a professor emeritus at the Australian National University.

== Education and career ==
Kennett graduated in Theoretical Physics at the University of Cambridge with a first class bachelor's degree in 1969 and then took the Mathematical Tripos Part III achieving Honours with Distinction in 1970. He received his Ph.D. in theoretical seismology from the Department of Applied Mathematics and Theoretical Physics in 1973. He was a Research Fellow of Emmanuel College, Cambridge from 1972 to 1976. As a postdoc, he was at the University of California, San Diego from 1974 to 1975, before returning in 1975 to the University of Cambridge, where he was a lecturer until he moved to Australia. In 1984, Kennett joined the Research School of Earth Sciences of the Australian National University (ANU) where he established a strong observational and theoretical program in seismology. He was a visiting scientist at, among other places, the University of Tokyo in 2002 and LMU Munich in 2009. From 2006 to 2010, he was director of the Research School of Earth Sciences of the ANU.

Kennett was elected in 1988 a Fellow of the American Geophysical Union and in 1996 an Honorary Fellow of the Royal Astronomical Society. From 1999 to 2003, he was President of the International Association of Seismology and Physics of the Earth’s Interior (IASPEI). He was elected as a Fellow of the Australian Academy of Science in 1994 and as a Fellow of the Royal Society of London in 2005.

Kennett has made significant contributions to research on the Earth's internal structure. His theoretical work on the form of seismograms and their application (e.g., seismic tomography) has contributed to the study of the Earth's mantle, particularly in Australia. He has developed comprehensive models of propagation velocities of seismic waves that serve as a basis for determining the epicenter of an earthquake, including the IASP91 model and the AK135 model.

== Awards and honours ==
- 1972 Smith Prize of the University of Cambridge
- 1981 Adams Prize of the University of Cambridge and St John's College, Cambridge
- 1994 Fellow of the Australian Academy of Science
- 2004 Humboldt Prize of the Alexander von Humboldt Foundation
- 2005 Jaeger Medal of the Australian Academy of Science
- 2005 Fellow of Royal Society
- 2006 Murchison Medal of the Geological Society of London
- 2007 Beno Gutenberg Medal of the European Geosciences Union (EGU)
- 2008 Gold Medal of the Royal Astronomical Society for Geophysics
- 2011 Matthew Flinders Medal and Lecture of the Australian Academy of Science
- 2017 Inge Lehmann Medal of the American Geophysical Union

== Books ==
- Seismic wave propagation in stratified media. Cambridge & New York: Cambridge University Press. 1983. Kennett, Brian (2009). New edition. ANU E Press. ISBN 9781921536731.
- as editor with Frode Ringdal: Monitoring the Comprehensive Nuclear Test-Ban Treaty: Sourse [i.e. Source] Location. Vol. 2. Basel; Boston: Birkhäuser. 2001. ISBN 9783764365349.
- The seismic wavefield: introduction and theoretical development. Vol. 1. Cambridge, UK; New York: Cambridge University Press. 2001. ISBN 9780521006637; 382 pages
- The seismic wavefield: interpretation of seismograms on regional and global scales. Vol. 2. Cambridge, UK; New York: Cambridge University Press. 2002. ISBN 9780521006651; 548 pages
- with Hans-Peter Bunge: Geophysical continua: deformation in the Earth's interior. Cambridge, UK; New York: Cambridge University Press. 2008. ISBN 9780511807435.
- Planning and managing scientific research: a guide for the beginning researcher. Canberra: ANU Press. 2014. ISBN 9781925021592; 93 pages
- with Erdinç Saygin, Tanya Fomin, and Richard Blewett: Deep crustal seismic reflection profiling: Australia 1978-2015. Acton, Australian Capital Territory, Australia: ANU Press and Geoscience Australia. 2016. ISBN 9781760460853; 224 pages
