= Thomas Byerley =

Thomas Byerley may refer to:

- Thomas Byerley (journalist) (1789–1826), English journalist
- Thomas Byerley (potter) (1747–1810), English businessman, partner in the Wedgwood pottery firm
