= Barbara Romanowicz =

French-American physicist and seismologist

Barbara A. Romanowicz
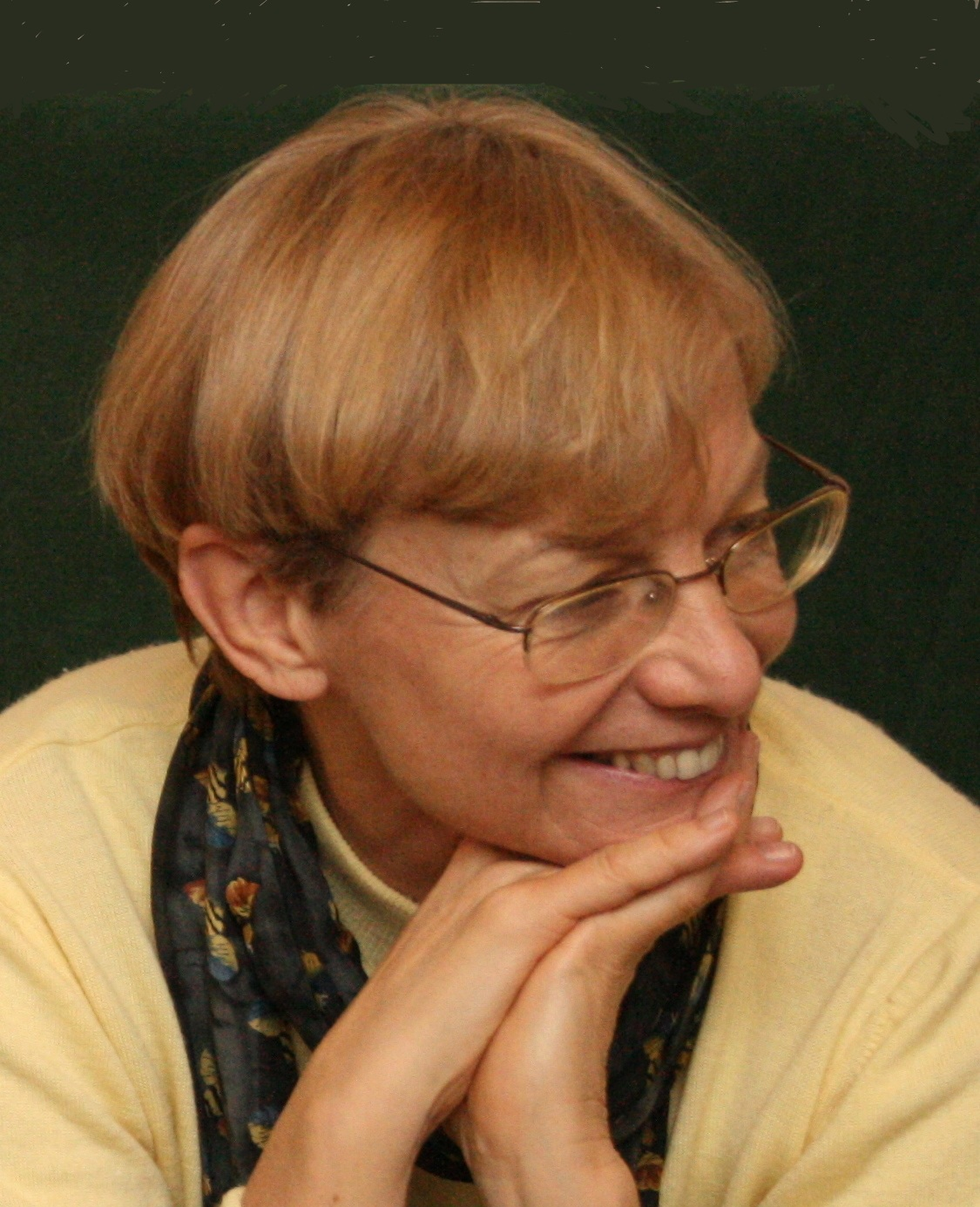
- Romanowicz in 2010
- Born: 5 April 1950 (age 76); Suresnes, France
- Occupation: Geophysicist

Barbara A. Romanowicz FRS (born 5 April 1950) is a French geophysicist and an expert on imaging the Earth's interior. She was elected a Fellow of the Royal Society in May 2026.

== Early life ==
Romanowicz was born in Suresnes, France.

She is the daughter of Kazimierz Romanowicz and Zofia Romanowiczowa. The first years of Barbara's life were an inspiration for Zofia Romanowiczowa's debut novel entitled Baśka and Barbara.

== Education ==
Romanowicz received a BSc degree in mathematics from the Ecole Normale Supérieure, a MSc in applied physics from Harvard University, and doctoral degrees in astronomy from Pierre and Marie Curie University and in geophysics from Paris Diderot University.

== Career ==
From 1979 to 1981, Romanowicz was a postdoctoral researcher at the Massachusetts Institute of Technology. From 1982 to 1990, while working as a researcher at the Centre national de la recherche scientifique (CNRS), she developed a global network of seismic stations known as GEOSCOPE to study earthquakes and the interior structure of the Earth. From 1990 to 2011, she was director of the Berkeley Seismological Laboratory; she was also a professor in the Earth and Planetary Science department at the University of California, Berkeley. During her time at the Berkeley laboratory, she helped develop a real-time earthquake notification system for northern California. In 2011 she was named to the chair of Physics of the Earth Interior at the Collège de France, where she regularly organises symposiums on topics related to the evolution of the Earth.

She has been European editor for Geophysical Research Letters and editor for Physics of the Earth and Planetary Interiors.

She is the founder of Cooperative Institute for Dynamic Earth Research (CIDER), which was established with the goal to engage geoscientist on multidisciplinary research.

From 2011 to 2020, she was professor at the Collège de France (Paris) in the chair "Physique de l'intérieur de la Terre".

In 2019, Romanowicz received the William Bowie Medal for "outstanding contributions for fundamental geophysics and for unselfish cooperation in research". Her citation includes:

Dr. Romanowicz's research is characterized by innovative seismological theory, sophisticated numerical methods, and insightful interpretations that have illuminated key Earth processes.

— Karen Fischer

== Honors and awards ==
- 1990 Fellow, American Geophysical Union
- 1992 Silver Medal of the Centre National de la Recherche Scientifique
- 1999 Alfred Wegener Medal of the European Union of Geosciences
- 2001 Fellow, American Academy of Arts and Sciences
- 2003 Gutenberg Medal, European Geophysical Society
- 2005 Member, National Academy of Sciences
- 2008 Chevalier de la Légion d'Honneur, France
- 2009 Inge Lehmann Medal of the American Geophysical Union
- 2010 Miller Professor, University of California, Berkeley
- 2011 Harry Reid Medal of the Seismological Society of America
- 2013 Elected Member, Académie des Sciences, France
- 2019 William Bowie Medal of the American Geophysical Union
- 2020 Wollaston Medal of the Geological Society of London
- 2026 Fellow of the Royal Society

== Personal life ==
In 1979, Romanowicz married Mark Jonikas.
