= Glen Lukens Award =

- Description: Annual scholarship for the "Outstanding Studio Artist"
- Country: United States
- Presented by: USC Roski School of Art and Design

The Glen Lukens Award is an annual cash scholarship given to the "Outstanding Studio Artist" at the University of Southern California School of Fine Arts.

The award honors Missouri-born ceramist, jewelry designer, and glassmaker, Glen William Lukens, of the University of Southern California in Los Angeles. He was influential in the Studio pottery movement in the United States and taught ceramics, metalwork and jewelry making in the 1930s.
