= Bradford H. Hager =

American geophysicist

Bradford H. Hager is an American geophysicist. He has taught at the Caltech Seismological Laboratory and MIT, and worked at NASA's NISAR Science Definition Team. A fellow of the American Geophysical Union, he won a Inge Lehmann and a James B. Macelwane medal.
