= James C. Savage =

James C. Savage is an American geodesist, United States Geological Survey researcher and former president of the Seismological Society of America. He won a Charles A. Whitten medal in 1989.
