= Clarence R. Allen =

American geologist (1925–2021)

- Born: February 15, 1925; Palo Alto, California, U.S.
- Died: January 21, 2021 (aged 95)
- Education: Reed College, California Institute of Technology
- Awards: G.K. Gilbert Award
- Scientific career
- Fields: planetary science, geology
- Institutions: Caltech

Clarence Roderic Allen (February 15, 1925 – January 21, 2021) was an American geologist who studied seismology.

== Career ==
He was a graduate of Reed College (B.A., 1949) and the California Institute of Technology (M.S., 1951; Ph.D., 1954).

Allen was President of the Seismological Society of America in 1975 and the Geological Society of America. He was a member of the American Association for the Advancement of Science, the American Geophysical Union, and the Geological Society of America. He was elected a Fellow of the American Academy of Arts and Sciences in 1975. Allen was a member of the National Academy of Sciences and the National Academy of Engineering since 1976.

Allen received the first G.K. Gilbert Award in Seismic Geology and in 1995 he received the Medal of the Seismological Society of America.

He was a member of the faculty of the California Institute of Technology since 1955. He became a professor emeritus there in 1990.

Allan died on January 21, 2021, at the age of 95.

== Publications ==
- "Geology of Earthquakes" with Robert S. Yeats and Kerry E. Sieh. Oxford University Press (1997) ISBN 0-19-507827-6
- "Comparative study of the neotectonics of the Xianshuihe fault, China" (1987)
- "Continuation of creep and strain studies in southern California" (1984)
- "Creep and strain studies in southern California: Final technical report" (1986)
- "Seismicity of the Southern California Region, 1 January 1932 to 31 December 1972" with John M. Nordquist and James A. Hileman (1973)
- "Active faulting in northern Turkey" (1969)
- "Agua Blanca fault: A major transverse structure of northern Baja California, Mexico" (1960)
