= Keiiti Aki =

Japanese-American professor of Geophysics

- Born: March 3, 1930; Yokohama, Japan
- Died: May 17, 2005 (aged 75)
- Citizenship: the United States
- Education: University of Tokyo
- Scientific career
- Fields: Geophysics
- Workplaces: MIT; University of Southern California
- Doctoral students: Shamita Das

Keiiti Aki (安芸 敬一, Aki Keiichi; March 3, 1930 – May 17, 2005) was a Japanese-American professor of Geophysics at the Massachusetts Institute of Technology (MIT), and then at the University of Southern California (USC), seismologist, author and mentor. He and Paul G. Richards coauthored "Quantitative Seismology: theory and methods".

== Biography ==
Aki was born in Yokohama, Japan. He received his bachelor's degree in 1952 and doctoral degree in 1958, both from the University of Tokyo. Until 1960, he conducted research at that university's Earthquake Research Institute. He then did post-doctoral research at the Caltech Seismological Laboratory, where he worked with Frank Press.

Press invited Aki to join him at MIT in 1966. This second visit to the United States coincided with the 1966 Parkfield earthquake, noteworthy for its so-called coda waves, reverberations of seismic energy due to multiple scattering from subsurface inhomogeneities. Aki "developed a passion for using those waves to investigate Earth," according to Bill Ellsworth, Aki's former student who was later head of the USGS seismology group. "He came from Japan as a statistically oriented seismologist, but he was not afraid to transform himself."

Aki was very active in his field and was the president or chair of many organizations. He was the president of Seismological Section of the AGU, president of the Seismological Society of America, and Chair of the NAS Committee on Seismology. He was instrumental in the creation of the Southern California Earthquake Center, headquartered at the University of Southern California, in 1991, he having moved to USC from MIT in 1984.

In 1995, Aki moved to the seismically active island Réunion, east of Madagascar in the Indian Ocean, where he continued to work until his death there in 2005. He sustained an injury to his brain from a fall while walking in the street on May 13; he fell into a coma and died on May 17. He is buried in Le Tampon cemetery. He left behind two sons (Shota and Zenta) and two daughters (Kajika and Uka).

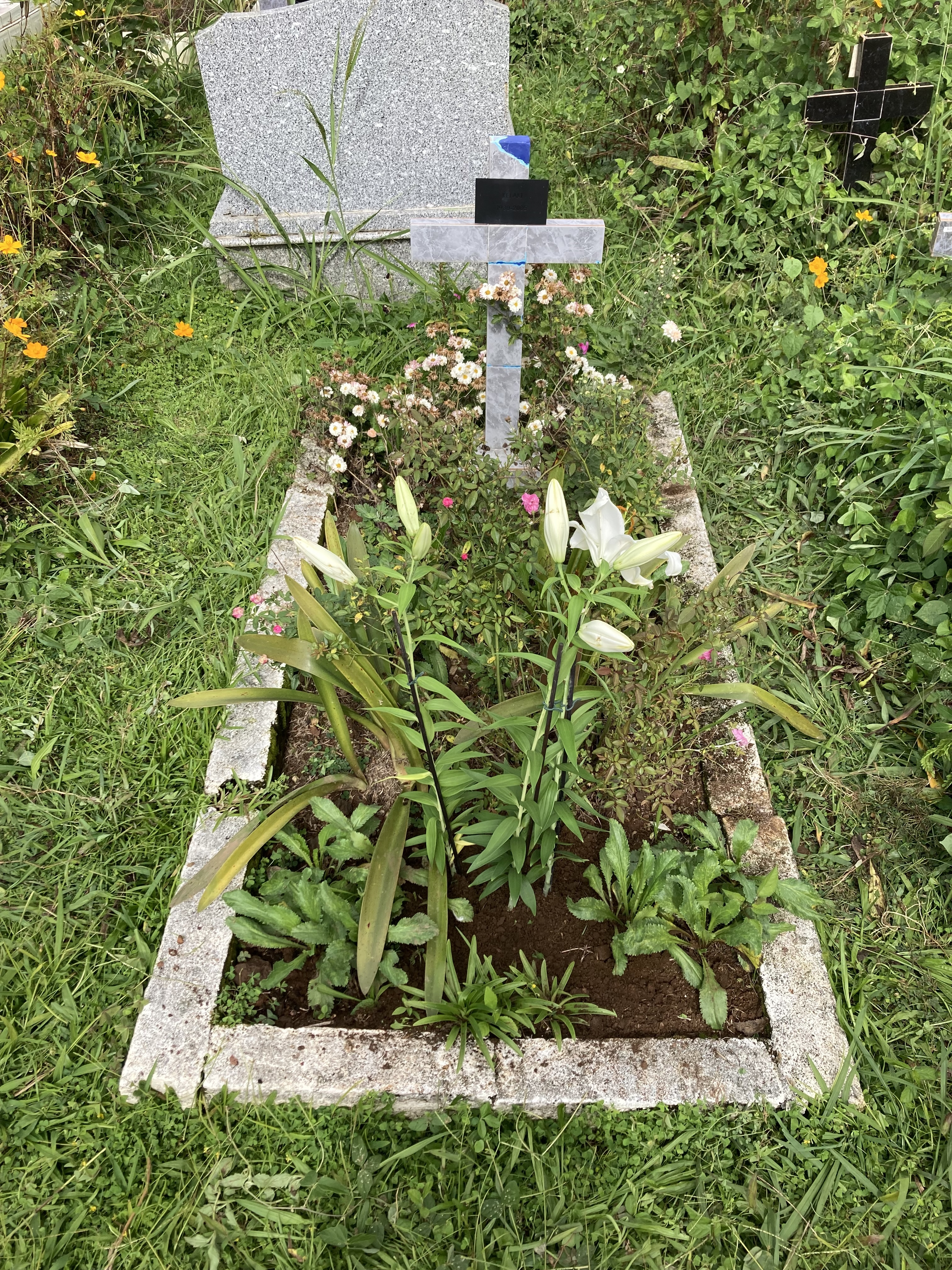
Grave of Keiiti Aki (Le Tampon cemetery, La Réunion)

== Honors received ==
- Fellow of the American Academy of Arts and Sciences (1973)
- Election to the U.S. National Academy of Sciences (1979)
- Medal of Seismological Society of America (1986)
- Thorarinsson Medal from the International Association of Volcanology and Chemistry of the Earth's Interior (2000)
- William Bowie Medal of the American Geophysical Union (2004)
- Beno Gutenberg Medal of the European Geosciences Union (2005)

== Selected publications ==
- Aki, Keiiti (1966). "4. Generation and propagation of G waves from the Niigata earthquake of June 14, 1964. Part 2. Estimation of earthquake moment, released energy and stress-strain drop from G wave spectrum" (PDF). Bulletin of the Earthquake Research Institute. 44: 73–88.
- Aki, Keiti; Richards, Paul G. (2002). Quantitative seismology (2 ed.). University Science Books. ISBN 0-935702-96-2.

Preceded by None	Southern California Earthquake Center Director; 1991 – 1995	Succeeded by Thomas Henyey
