= Christopher A. Scholz =

American geologist

- Education: Duke University; University of Minnesota; University of Vermont
- Awards: Israel C. Russell Award of the Geological Society of America (2022)
- Scientific career
- Fields: Earth science, Paleolimnology
- Workplaces: Syracuse University
- Website: rifts.syr.edu

Christopher Alfred Scholz is an American geologist who is known for his work in Paleolimnology and Rift Basin Evolution. He is Professor of Earth and Environmental Sciences at Syracuse University.

== Biography ==
Scholz received his B.S. from the University of Vermont in 1981, M.S. from the University of Minnesota in May 1985, and his Ph.D. from the Duke University in 1989, all in geology. He joined the faculty of Duke U. as a research associate in 1990. Scholz moved to the University of Miami in 1994 as an Assistant Professor and was promoted to associate professor in 1998. Since 1998, he has worked at Syracuse University.

Scholz is a leading expert in lake systems and paleolimnology, specializing in reconstructing past environments of inland waters. His research uses seismic and sediment core data from lakes worldwide to understand the evolution of lake systems. He has conducted studies on the African Great Lakes, including Lake Malawi, where his team drilled a 378-meter core providing a 1.3 million-year record of African climate change. Scholz has also researched Lake Baikal in Siberia, and many lake basins in North America. He has authored over 100 journal articles, and has led research on environmental changes in the Finger Lakes in Upstate New York, and the potential impact of climate change on Lake Victoria in East Africa.

Scholz is an active member of American Association of Petroleum Geologists, American Geophysical Union, and Geological Society of America.

== Awards ==
Scholz was awarded the Israel C. Russell Award from the Geological Society of America in 2022. In 2017, Scholz received the Syracuse University Chancellor's Citation for Faculty Excellence and Distinction.
