= Mount Byerly =

Mountain in Ellsworth Land, Antarctica

Mount Byerly (81°53′S 89°23′W) is a major peak in the eastern part of the Nash Hills, Marie Byrd Land. It was positioned by the U.S. Ellsworth-Byrd Traverse Party on December 10, 1958, and named for Perry Byerly, chairman of the Technical Panel for Seismology and Gravity of the U.S. National Committee for the International Geophysical Year, as set up by the U.S. National Academy of Sciences.

== See also ==
- Mountains in Antarctica
