= Kerry Sieh =

American geologist and seismologist

- Scientific career
- Fields: Geology, seismology

Kerry E. Sieh is an American geologist and seismologist.

Sieh's principal research interest is earthquake geology, which uses geological layers and landforms to understand the geometries of active faults, the earthquakes they generate, and the crustal structure their movements produce. His early work on the San Andreas Fault led to the discovery of how often and how regularly it produces large earthquakes in southern California.

Sieh received his undergraduate degree in geology from the University of California, Riverside in 1972 and his Ph.D. degree in geology from Stanford University in 1977. He was a professor of geology at the California Institute of Technology from 1986 to 2009. Soon after joining Caltech, Sieh was recognized by the Los Angeles Times as a "Rising Star" in Southern California in 1988. Sieh is a member of the United States National Academy of Sciences (since 1999).

In 2009, Sieh became the director of Nanyang Technological University's Earth Observatory. He is the first holder of the AXA-NTU Chair on Natural Hazards in Southeast Asia established in 2012.

== Awards and honors ==
- Harry Fielding Reid Medal, 2014
- LGBTQ Scientist of the Year Award, National Organization of Gay and Lesbian Scientists and Technical Professionals, 2006
- Fellow, American Geophysical Union, 2001
- National Academy of Sciences, member, 1999
- Fellow, Geological Society of America, 1996
- National Academy of Sciences Award for Initiatives in Research, 1982
- E.B. Burwell Jr., Memorial Award of the Engineering Geology Division, Geological Society of America, 1980

== Publications ==
- "Geology of Earthquakes" with Robert S. Yeats and Clarence R. Allen. Oxford University Press (1997) ISBN 0-19-507827-6
- "The Earth in Turmoil: Earthquakes and Volcanos and Their Impact on Humankind" with Simon LeVay. W. H. Freeman & Sons (1998) ISBN 0-7167-3151-7
- "Living on an Active Earth: Perspectives on Earthquake Science" as part of the Committee on the Science of Earthquakes, National Research Council. National Academies Press (2003) ISBN 0-309-06562-3
