= Francis Anthony Dahlen =

Francis Anthony Dahlen (1942-June 3, 2007) was an American theoretical geophysicist. He was co-author of Theoretical global seismology. He won an Inge Lehmann Medal in 2003.
