= Donald V. Helmberger =

American seismologist (1938–2020)

- Born: Donald Vincent Helmberger; January 23, 1938; Perham, Minnesota
- Died: August 13, 2020 (aged 82)
- Education: University of Minnesota (BS); University of California, San Diego (MS, PhD)
- Scientific career
- Workplaces: Massachusetts Institute of Technology; Princeton University; California Institute of Technology

Donald Vincent Helmberger (January 1938 – February 2020) was an American seismologist; described in his Seismological Research Letters obituary as "one of the most impactful seismologists to have lived". A memorial issue in Earthquake Science (Note: ISSN 1674-4519, published by Elsevier with KeAi for the Institute of Geophysics, China Earthquake Administration) was published in his honor February 2022. He served as head of the Caltech Seismological Laboratory from 1998 to 2003, and was the Smits Family Professor of Geophysics, Emeritus upon his death. He was named to the National Academy of Sciences in 2004.

Helmberger was the first winner of the Inge Lehmann Medal in 1997.

== Career ==
After earning his Ph.D. in 1967, he worked as a research associate for Massachusetts Institute of Technology, and then as a faculty member at Princeton University. He began working as an assistant professor at Caltech in 1970. He became an emeritus in 2017.

Ultra-low velocity zones were discovered by Helmberger in 1995.

Following his death, Mike Gurnis said that Helmberger had "discovered more about the deep interior of the Earth in the last half of the 20th century than any other researcher in the world."
