= Thomas H. Jordan =

American seismologist

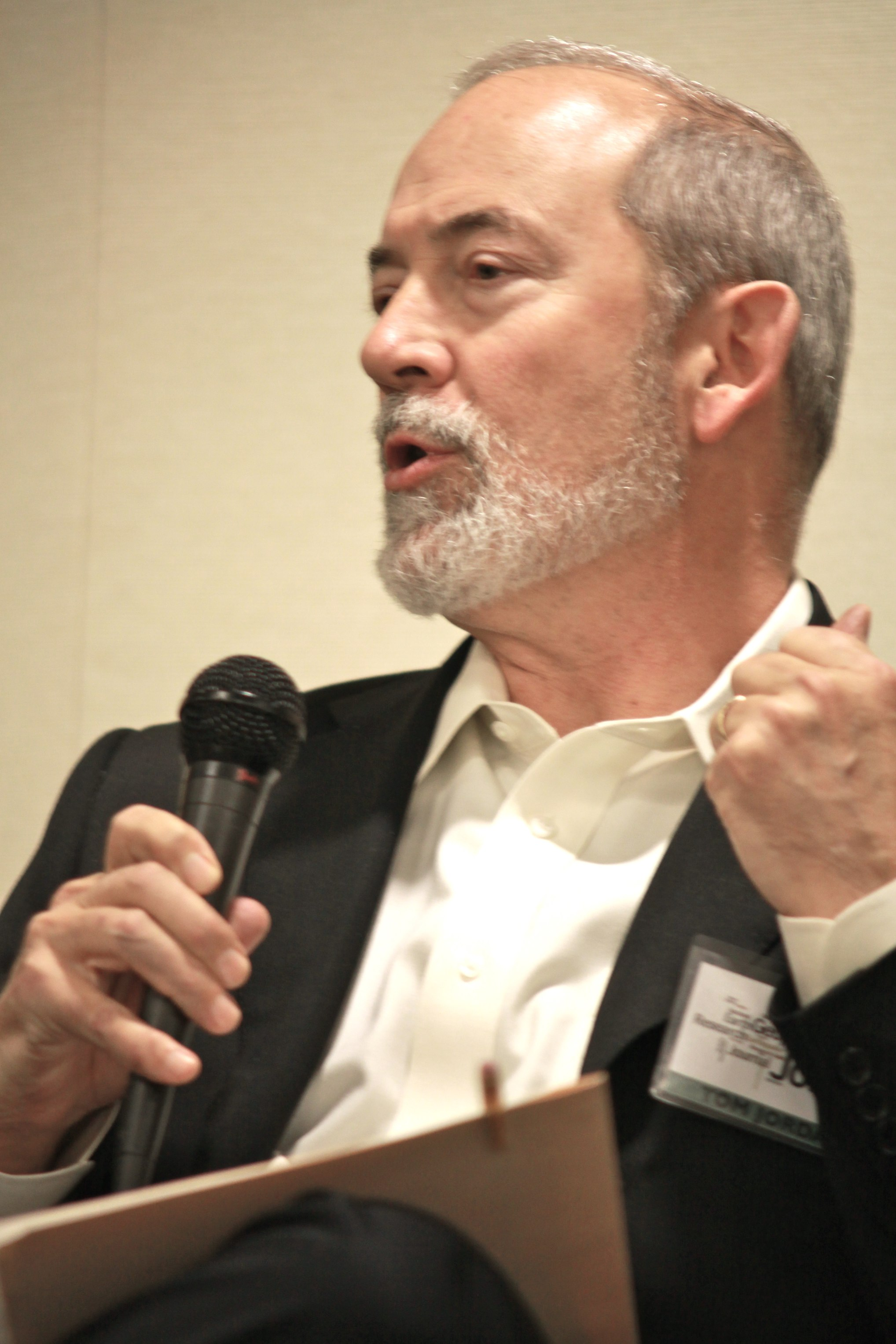
- Aat USC Creativity & Collaboration in 2010
- Born: Coco Solo, Panama Canal Zone
- Citizenship: United States
- Education: California Institute of Technology
- Known for: Plate Tectonics, Seismology, Imaging Techniques
- Scientific career
- Fields: Seismology, Geology
- Workplaces: University of Southern California, Scripps Institution of Oceanography, Massachusetts Institute of Technology, Princeton University
- Doctoral advisor: Don L. Anderson

Thomas H. Jordan is an American seismologist, and former director (2002–2017) of the Southern California Earthquake Center at the University of Southern California. He was formerly the head of the Earth, Atmospheric and Planetary Sciences Department at the Massachusetts Institute of Technology and is a member of the U.S. National Academy of Sciences, the American Academy of Arts and Sciences, and the American Philosophical Society.

== Research ==
Jordan has made significant contributions to plate tectonics concerning the structure of continents, the depth of lithospheric slab penetration, and the nature of mantle convection, for example determining the exact nature and processes involved in plate subduction. Jordan has also pioneered many seismic imaging techniques which he developed for his doctoral dissertation and are now used widely to understand the interior of the earth. Jordan has served on international committees concerning seismic hazard.

== Awards ==
In 2017, Jordan was nominated and selected to receive the Bowie Medal, one of the highest honors the American Geophysical Union awards its members. However, AGU rescinded the medal following receipt of a formal ethics complaint and corresponding investigation. The AGU board reaffirmed its decision following an appeal.

== Publications ==
Jordan has been published extensively in scientific journals. He has also published two textbooks, Understanding Earth and The Essential Earth.

Preceded by Thomas Henyey	Southern California Earthquake Center Director; October 2000 – present	Succeeded by Incumbent
