= James B. Macelwane =

American RC priest & seismologist (1883–1956)

The Reverend James B. Macelwane SJ
- Born: September 28, 1883; Sandusky Bay, Ohio
- Died: February 15, 1956 (aged 72)
- Education: Saint Louis University (B.A, 1910; M.A., 1911; M.S., 1912); University of California (Ph.D., 1923)
- Known for: Geophysics research, seismology networks, service
- Scientific career
- Fields: Seismology
- Workplaces: University of California, Saint Louis University

James B. Macelwane, S.J. (September 28, 1883 – February 15, 1956) was a Jesuit Catholic priest and pioneering American seismologist.

== Biography ==
Father Macelwane was the second of nine children born to Alexander Macelwane, a fisherman and farmer, and Catherine Agnes Carr.

He was on the faculty of Saint Louis University, St. Louis, Missouri (SLU), where he organized the Jesuit Seismological Service, whose central station is in St. Louis, in 1925.

Macelwane is the namesake of the James B. Macelwane Medal awarded annually by the American Geophysical Union (AGU) and the Macelwane Fellowship awarded by the American Meteorological Society (AMS). He served as President of the AGU from 1953 until his death in 1956. He was elected to the National Academy of Sciences (NAS) in 1944. The geological division of the SLU Department of Earth and Atmospheric Sciences is housed in Macelwane Hall.

== Works ==
- Introduction to Theoretical Seismology
- When the Earth Quakes

== See also ==
- List of Roman Catholic scientist-clerics
- List of Christians in science and technology
