= Seismological Society of America =

International scientific society

- Abbreviation: SSA
- Formation: 1906
- Type: Non-profit
- Purpose: An international society devoted to the advancement of seismology and its applications in understanding and mitigating earthquake hazards and in imaging the structure of the Earth.
- Headquarters: Albany, California
- Region served: global
- Members: 2,500 individuals; corporate members
- President: Susan Bilek
- Staff: 8
- Website: http://www.seismosoc.org

The Seismological Society of America (SSA) is an international scientific society devoted to the advancement of seismology and the understanding of earthquakes for the benefit of society. Founded in 1906, the society has members throughout the world representing seismologists and other geophysicists, geologists, engineers, insurers, and policy-makers in preparedness and safety.

== History ==
The society was established by academic, government, and other scientific and engineering professionals in the months following the April 18th San Francisco earthquake, with the first meeting of the Board of Directors taking place on December 1, 1906.

== Publications ==
The Seismological Society of America publishes the Bulletin of the Seismological Society of America (BSSA), a journal of research in earthquake seismology and related disciplines since 1911, and Seismological Research Letters (SRL), which serves as a forum for informal communication among seismologists, as well as between seismologists and those non-specialists interested in seismology and related disciplines.

The Bulletin of the Seismological Society of America (BSSA), first issued in 1911, is a bimonthly peer-reviewed journal of original seismological research as well as reviews which summarize topics of seismic research. Offering highly detailed, in-depth, and theoretical treatment of its subject matter by international authors, this journal appeals to an audience of specialists in the field of seismology.

Seismological Research Letters (SRL), first issued in 1987, is a peer-reviewed journal published bimonthly both in print and online. This journal appeals to a broader international audience of geoscientists beyond seismology as well as a possible crossover audience beyond the geoscientific specialties. As such, this journal publishes both original research and, to a lesser degree, educational, historical, and emerging topics of seismological science. Original research of similar scope can be found in both journals (BSSA above and SRL), but SRL papers tend to be less theoretical and more experimental in nature, as well as more timely.

The Seismic Record (TSR), established in 2021, publishes short peer-reviewed articles on the breadth of seismology and earthquake science. The articles, each no more than six published pages in total, cover recent events and current topics of strong significance, warranting rapid peer review and publication.

SSA follows a general policy of online open access permitting authors to post their work online at their discretion anytime 12 months after its initial publication by SSA.

== Meetings ==
The society hosts an annual meeting every April. The meeting is open to anyone. SSA members receive a discount on their meeting registration. The Eastern Section of SSA hosts an annual meeting each fall.

=== Past and future annual meetings ===
- 27–30 April 2021 – Virtual
- 23–26 April 2019 – Seattle, Washington
- 14–17 May 2018 – Miami, Florida
- 18–20 April 2017 – Denver, Colorado
- 20–22 April 2016 – Reno, Nevada
- 21–23 April 2015 – Pasadena, California
- 30 April-2 May 2014 – Anchorage, Alaska
- 17–19 April 2013 – Salt Lake City, Utah
- 17–19 April 2012 – San Diego, California
- 13–15 April 2011 – Memphis, Tennessee
- 21–23 April 2010 – Portland, Oregon
- 8–10 April 2009 – Monterey, California
- 16–18 April 2008 – Santa Fe, New Mexico
- 11–13 April 2007 – Kona, Hawaii
- 18–22 April 2006 – San Francisco, California
- 27–29 April 2005 – Lake Tahoe, Nevada
- 14–16 April 2004 – Palm Springs, California
- 30 April-3 May 2003 – San Juan, Puerto Rico
- 17–19 April 2002 – Victoria, British Columbia (Canada)
- 18–20 April 2001 – San Francisco, California
- 10–12 April 2000 – San Diego, California
- 3–5 May 1999 – Seattle, Washington
- 16–18 March 1998 – Boulder, Colorado
- 9–11 April 1997 – Honolulu, Hawaii
- 1–3 April 1996 – St. Louis, Missouri
- 22–24 March 1995 – El Paso, Texas
- 5–7 April 1994 – Pasadena, California
- 14–16 April 1993 – Ixtapa-Zihuatanejo, Mexico
- 14–16 April 1992 – Santa Fe, New Mexico
- 25–27 March 1991 – San Francisco, California
- 2–4 May 1990 – Santa Cruz, California
- 16–19 May 1973 – Golden, Colorado

== Past presidents ==
Past presidents of the Seismological Society of America:

- Heather DeShon, 2024
- Ruth Harris, 2023
- Peggy Hellweg, 2022
- John Townend, 2021
- Bill Walter, 2020
- Susan Hough, 2019
- Peter Shearer, 2018
- Andy Michael, 2017
- Jim Mori, 2016
- Ruth Harris, 2015
- Lisa Grant Ludwig, 2014
- Tom Jordan, 2013
- Christa von Hillebrandt–Andrade, 2011–12
- Richard C. Aster, 2009–10
- William L. Ellsworth, 2007–08
- Michael Fehler, 2005–06
- Stephen D. Malone, 2003–04
- Gail M. Atkinson, 2001–02
- Terry C. Wallace Jr., 1999–2000
- Ralph Archuleta, 1997–98
- Steve Wesnousky, 1995–96
- Tom Heaton, 1993–94
- Arch C. Johnston, 1992
- Robin K. McGuire, 1991
- Charles A. Langston, 1990
- John Filson, 1989
- Shelton S. Alexander, 1988
- David G. Harkrider, 1987
- C. Allin Cornell, 1986
- Hiroo Kanamori, 1985
- Gilbert A. Bollinger, 1984
- Robert M. Hamilton, 1983
- Lloyd S. Cluff, 1982
- Alan S. Ryall Jr., 1981
- Paul C. Jennings, 1980
- Keiiti Aki, 1979
- James C. Savage, 1978
- George W. Housner, 1977
- Otto W. Nuttli, 1976
- Clarence R. Allen, 1975
- Bruce A. Bolt, 1974
- Don Tocher, 1973
- Carl Kisslinger, 1972
- Donald E. Hudson, 1971
- James N. Brune, 1970
- Norman A. Haskell, 1969
- Joseph W. Berg Jr., 1968
- Karl V. Steinbrugge, 1967
- Jerry P. Eaton, 1966
- William U. Stauder, S.J., 1965
- Jack E. Oliver, 1964
- B. F. Howell Jr., 1963
- Frank Press, 1962
- Dean S. Carder, 1961
- James T. Wilson, 1960
- Charles F. Richter, 1959
- Hugo Benioff, 1958
- Perry Byerly, 1957
- Maurice Ewing, 1955–56
- Lydik S. Jacobsen, 1953–54
- John P. Buwalda, 1951–52
- Frank Neumann, 1949–50
- Eliot Blackwelder, 1948
- Beno Gutenberg, 1945–47
- Walter H. Kirkbride, 1943–44
- Ernest A. Hodgson, 1941–42
- Robert E. Andrews, 1939–40
- Nicholas H. Heck, 1936–38
- Sidney D. Townley, 1935
- George D. Louderback, 1930–34
- James B. Macelwane, S.J., 1928–29
- Bailey Willis, 1921–27
- Otto Klotz, 1920
- Charles F. Marvin, 1918–19
- Jay Backus Woodworth, 1916–17
- Alexander G. McAdie, 1915
- George D. Louderback, 1914
- Harry F. Reid, 1912–13
- John C. Branner, 1911
- Andrew C. Lawson, 1910
- George Davidson, 1906–09

== See also ==
- American Geological Institute
- Geological Society of America
- IRIS Consortium
- List of geoscience organizations
