= Bayesian operational modal analysis =

Bayesian operational modal analysis (BAYOMA) adopts a Bayesian system identification approach for operational modal analysis (OMA). Operational modal analysis aims at identifying the modal properties (natural frequencies, damping ratios, mode shapes, etc.) of a constructed structure using only its (output) vibration response (e.g., velocity, acceleration) measured under operating conditions. The (input) excitations to the structure are not measured but are assumed to be 'ambient' ('broadband random'). In a Bayesian context, the set of modal parameters are viewed as uncertain parameters or random variables whose probability distribution is updated from the prior distribution (before data) to the posterior distribution (after data). The peak(s) of the posterior distribution represents the most probable value(s) (MPV) suggested by the data, while the spread of the distribution around the MPV reflects the remaining uncertainty of the parameters.

== Pros and cons ==
In the absence of (input) loading information, the identified modal properties from OMA often have significantly larger uncertainty (or variability) than their counterparts identified using free vibration or forced vibration (known input) tests. Quantifying and calculating the identification uncertainty of the modal parameters become relevant.

The advantage of a Bayesian approach for OMA is that it provides a fundamental means via the Bayes' theorem to process the information in the data for making statistical inference on the modal properties in a manner consistent with modeling assumptions and probability logic.

The potential disadvantage of Bayesian approach is that the theoretical formulation can be more involved and less intuitive than their non-Bayesian counterparts. Algorithms are needed for efficient computation of the statistics (e.g., mean and variance) of the modal parameters from the posterior distribution. Unlike non-Bayesian methods, the algorithms are often implicit and iterative. E.g., optimization algorithms may be involved in the determination of most probable value, which may not converge for poor quality data.

== Methods ==
Bayesian formulations have been developed for OMA in the time domain and in the frequency domain using the spectral density matrix and fast Fourier transform (FFT) of ambient vibration data. Based on the formulation for FFT data, fast algorithms have been developed for computing the posterior statistics of modal parameters. Recent developments based on EM algorithm show promise for simpler algorithms and reduced coding effort. The fundamental precision limit of OMA has been investigated and presented as a set of uncertainty laws which can be used for planning ambient vibration tests.

== Connection with maximum likelihood method ==
Bayesian method and maximum likelihood method (non-Bayesian) are based on different philosophical perspectives but they are mathematically connected; see, e.g., and Section 9.6 of. For example,

- Assuming a uniform prior, the most probable value (MPV) of parameters in a Bayesian method is equal to the location where the likelihood function is maximized, which is the estimate in Maximum Likelihood Method
- Under a Gaussian approximation of the posterior distribution of parameters, their covariance matrix is equal to the inverse of Hessian of the negative log of likelihood function at the MPV. Generally, this covariance depends on data. However, if one assumes (hypothetically; non-Bayesian) that the data is indeed distributed as the likelihood function, then for large data size it can be shown that the covariance matrix is asymptotically equal to the inverse of the Fisher information matrix (FIM) of parameters (which has a non-Bayesian origin). This coincides with the Cramer–Rao bound in classical statistics, which gives the lower bound (in the sense of matrix inequality) of the ensemble variance of any unbiased estimator. Such lower bound can be reached by maximum-likelihood estimator for large data size.
- In the above context, for large data size the asymptotic covariance matrix of modal parameters depends on the 'true' parameter values (a non-Bayesian concept), often in an implicit manner. It turns out that by applying further assumptions such as small damping and high signal-to-noise ratio, the covariance matrix has mathematically manageable asymptotic form, which provides insights on the achievable precision limit of OMA and can be used to guide ambient vibration test planning. This is collectively referred as 'uncertainty law'.

== See also ==
- Operational modal analysis
- Bayesian inference
- Ambient vibrations
- Microtremor
- Modal analysis
- Modal testing

== Notes ==
- See monographs on non-Bayesian OMA and Bayesian OMA
- See OMA datasets
- See Jaynes and Cox for Bayesian inference in general.
- See Beck for Bayesian inference in structural dynamics (relevant for OMA)
- The uncertainty of the modal parameters in OMA can also be quantified and calculated in a non-Bayesian manner. See Pintelon et al.
