= Operational modal analysis =

Ambient modal identification, also known as operational modal analysis (OMA), aims at identifying the modal properties of a structure based on vibration data collected when the structure is under its operating conditions, i.e., no initial excitation or known artificial excitation. The modal properties of a structure include primarily the natural frequencies, damping ratios and mode shapes. In an ambient vibration test the subject structure can be under a variety of excitation sources which are not measured but are assumed to be 'broadband random'. The latter is a notion that one needs to apply when developing an ambient identification method. The specific assumptions vary from one method to another. Regardless of the method used, however, proper modal identification requires that the spectral characteristics of the measured response reflect the properties of the modes rather than those of the excitation.

== Pros and cons ==
Implementation economy is one primary advantage of ambient vibration tests as only the (output) vibration of the structure needs to be measured. This is particularly attractive for civil engineering structures (e.g., buildings, bridges) where it can be expensive or disruptive to carry out free vibration or forced vibration tests (with known input).

Identifying modal properties using ambient data does have disadvantages:

- The identification methods are more sophisticated. As the loading is not measured, in the development of the identification method, it needs to be modeled (by some stochastic process), or its dynamic effects on the measured response have to be removed. Otherwise, it is not possible to explain the characteristics in the data based solely on the modal properties.
- Without loading information, the identified modal properties can have significant identification uncertainties. In particular, the results are as good as the broadband assumption applied.
- The identified modal properties only reflect the properties at the ambient vibration level, which is usually lower than the serviceability level or other design cases of interest. This is especially relevant for the damping ratio, which is commonly perceived to be amplitude-dependent.
- The measurement system needs to be low-noise and sensitive, since structures mainly vibrate at low levels in their operational conditions.

== Methods ==
Methods of OMA can be broadly classified by two aspects, 1) frequency domain or time domain, and 2) Bayesian or non-Bayesian. Non-Bayesian methods were developed earlier than Bayesian ones. They make use of some statistical estimators with known theoretical properties for identification, e.g., the correlation function or spectral density of measured vibrations. Common non-Bayesian methods include stochastic subspace identification (time domain) and frequency domain decomposition (frequency domain). Bayesian methods have been developed in the time-domain and frequency-domain.

== Frequency domain and time domain operational modal analysis of structures ==
The objective of operational modal analysis is to extract resonant frequencies, damping, and/or operating shapes (unscaled mode shapes) of a structure. This method sometime called output-only modal analysis because only the response of the structure is measured. The structure might be excited using natural operating conditions or some other excitations might be applied to the structure; however, as long as the operating shapes are not scaled based on the applied force, it is called operational modal analysis (e.g. operating shapes of a wind turbine blade excited by a shaker are measured using operating modal analysis). This method has been used to extract operating modes of a hovering helicopter.

== Operational modal analysis versus operational deflection shape ==
The two terms, Operational Modal Analysis and Operational Deflection Shape, are very similar, but refer to two different analysis approaches. Both use ambient vibration data as inputs, but in the case of Operational Deflection Shapes, a shape that corresponds to the overall vibration response is created. It is based on the vibration amplitude only, there is no attempt to extract a mode shape and no quantification of the modal damping can be obtained. While Operational Modal Analysis, when the main assumptions are met, yields a representation of a system characteristic in its operating environment, an Operational Deflection Shape will simply extract the system response under the currently applied loads.

== Notes ==
- See monographs on non-Bayesian OMA and Bayesian OMA.
- See OMA datasets.

== See also ==
- Frequency domain decomposition
- Bayesian operational modal analysis
- Ambient vibrations
- Microtremor
- Modal analysis
- Modal testing
