= Ernst von Rebeur-Paschwitz =

German astronomer, geophysicist and seismologist

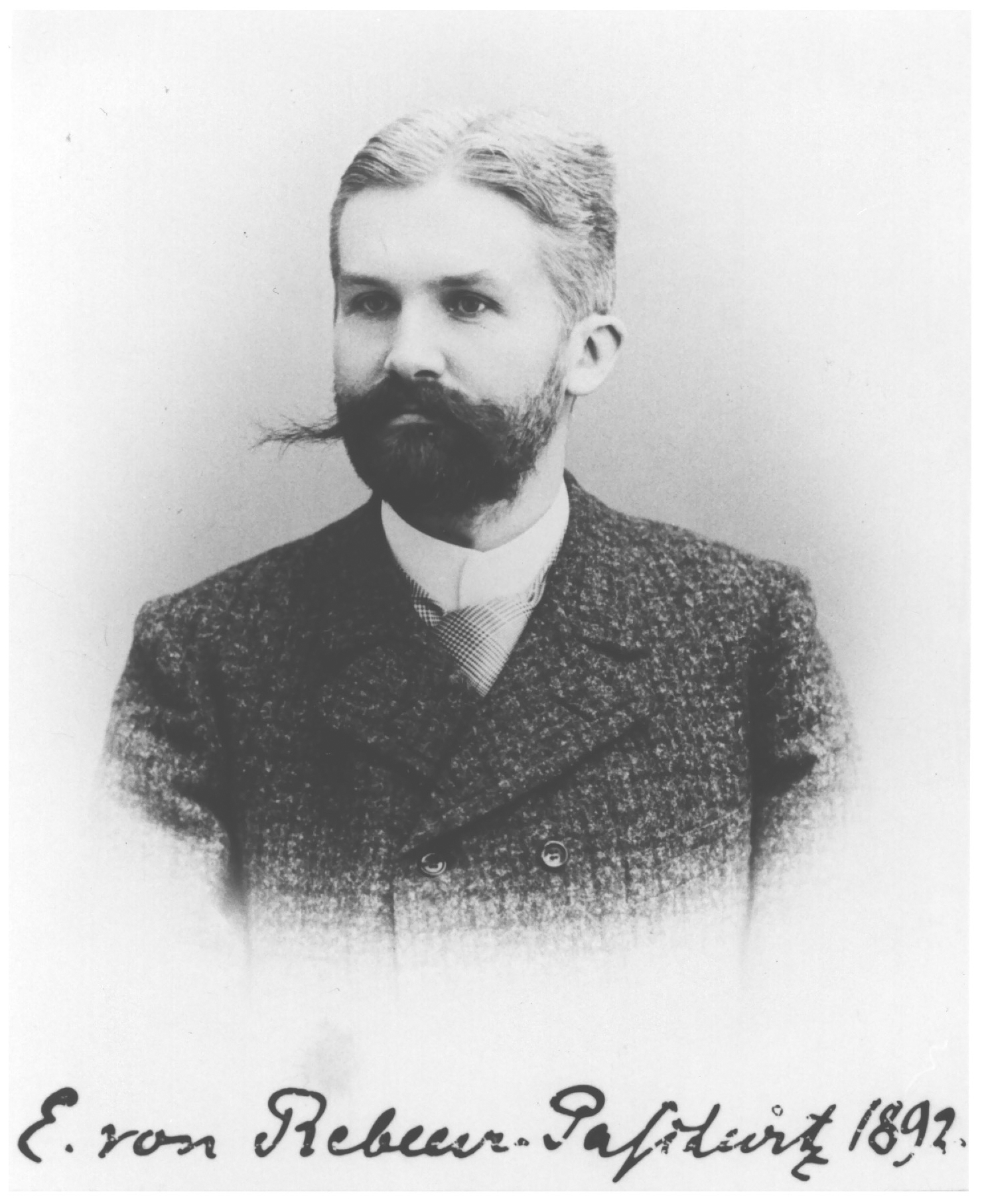
- Born: 9 August 1861; Frankfurt (Oder), Kingdom of Prussia
- Died: 1 October 1895 (aged 34); Merseburg, Germany
- Citizenship: German
- Education: Humboldt University of Berlin
- Known for: the first recording of teleseism with the use of his sensitive self-registering horizontal pendulums in 1889
- Scientific career
- Fields: seismology, geophysics, astronomy

Ernst von Rebeur-Paschwitz (9 August 1861 – 1 October 1895) was a German astronomer, geophysicist and seismologist. He is best known for the first recording of teleseism with the use of his sensitive self-registering horizontal pendulums in 1889. He proposed to create an international network of seismological stations. His ideas led to the founding of the International Seismological Association.

== Life ==
Ernst von Rebeur-Paschwitz was born on 9 August 1861 in Frankfurt/Oder. His father worked as a government officer and Rebeur-Paschwitz had to change schools frequently. He attended the knight academy in Leignitz, as well as high schools in Wroclaw and Frankfurt/Oder. Later Rebeur-Paschwitz studied mathematics and astronomy in Leipzig. After traveling to England and Ireland, he continued studies in Berlin and Geneva, with a one-year break for military service. In 1883, he received his doctorate at the University of Berlin with a dissertation "On the Movement of Comets in Resisting Average" and became an assistant at the Observatory.

In 1884 Rebeur-Paschwitz began having health problems. He was treated in Switzerland, Italy and on Tenerife. The condition of his throat and chest precluded him from giving lectures. From 1891, he was mostly confined to a bed and left his room only during summer.

Ernst von Rebeur-Paschwitz died of tuberculosis on 1 October 1895 in Merseburg at the age of 34.

== Sensitive horizontal pendulums ==
In 1885, working as an assistant at the University of Karlsruhe, Rebeur-Paschwitz became interested in Friedrich Zöllner’s pendulum. In 1886, he started construction of a horizontal pendulum at the astronomical observatory of Karlsruhe with the idea to measure oscillations of the plumb line resulting from the influence of astronomical bodies. This pendulums was also sensitive to horizontal accelerations of the ground.

Rebeur-Paschwitz became the first person to continuously record movements of the ground on photographic paper. Between 1886 and 1895 Rebeur-Paschwitz developed three models of pendulums. He collaborated with three different manufacturers: the Fecker pendulum in 1886, the Repsold pendulum in 1888, and the Stückrath two-component model in 1894.

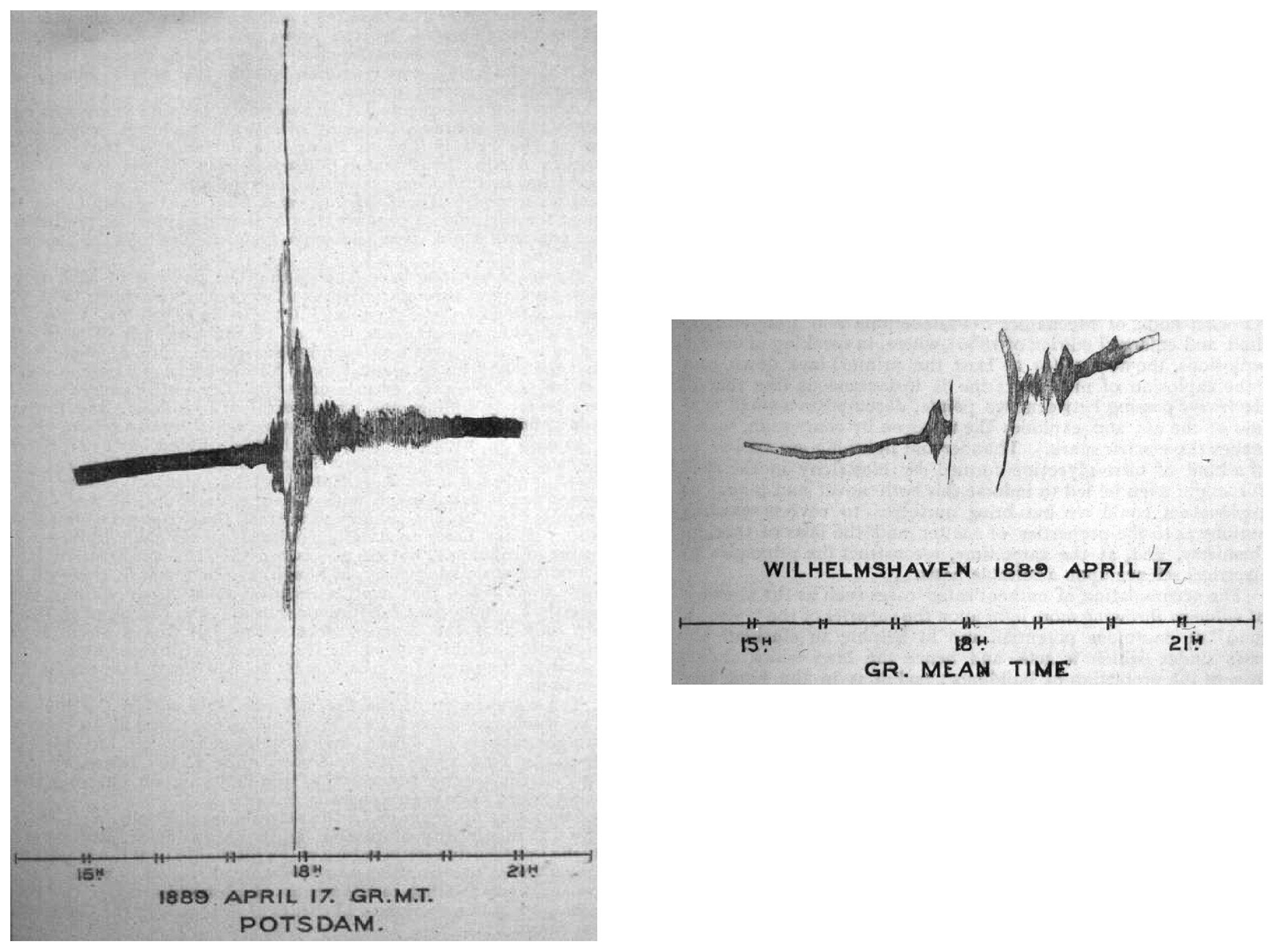
Seismogram records in Potsdam and Wilhelmshaven, from von Rebeur-Paschwitz

Rebeur-Paschwitz installed one of his pendulum in Potsdam and the second one in Wilhelmshaven close to the North Sea. The pendulums designed to measure the horizontal motion of the ground due to supposed lunar tides. On 17 April 1889 he recorded very strong deflections of the vertical axis on both instruments at the time when a strong earthquake occurred near Tokyo in Japan. 64 minutes after its impulse was recorded in Tokyo, Rebeur-Paschwitz observed disturbance on his instruments at Potsdam and Wilhelmshaven, which means that the seismic waves had gone a distance of more than 5000 miles through the inside of the Earth at the average speed of more than a mile per second. Rebeur-Paschwitz was the first to detect earthquake vibration that had passed through the inside of the Earth. Even though the shaking of local earthquakes was recorded several times before, this was the first time when the waves of a faraway earthquake had been registered. The realization that strong earthquakes can be recorded at great distances helped usher in the modern era in the field of seismology and the physics of the Earth’s interior.

This observation marked the change of seismology from a regional to a global science, and helped to usher in the science of modern observational seismology.

== International seismological cooperation ==
Rebeur-Paschwitz realized the necessity for international cooperation in the field of seismology, and in 1895 at the International Geographical Congress proposed to install a homogeneous global seismological station network equipped with horizontal pendulums. As a result, Englishman John Milne established network of stations with simply-to-use horizontal pendulums in the British colonies.

In his last publication of the same year, Rebeur-Paschwitz also argued for establishing an internationally centralized bureau to collect global seismological observations.

Georg C. K. Gerland presented Rebeur-Paschwitz’s ideas at the sixth International Geographic Conference in London in 1895, and organized the first International Conference of Seismology in Strasbourg in 1901. It was the start of international cooperation in seismology and led to the founding two years later of the International Seismological Association (since 1951 the International Association of Seismology and Physics of the Earth’s Interior (IASPEI)).

== Medal ==
The Ernst von Rebeur-Paschiwitz Medal is awarded by the German Geophysical Society for outstanding scientific achievements in geophysics. Winners include: 2017 Lev Vinnik, Moscow; 2015 Rongjiang Wang, Potsdam; 2008 Winfried Hanka, Potsdam; 2007 Karl Hinz, Hanover; 2004 Walter Zürn, Schiltach / Karlsruhe.

== Publications ==
- Das Horizontalpendel und seine Anwendung zur Beobachtung der absoluten und relativen Richtungs-Aenderungen der Lothlinie: Ergebnisse einiger mit Unterstützung der Königlich Preussischen Akademie der Wissenschaften in den Jahren 1889-1892 auf den Observatorien zu Wilhelmshaven und Potsdam sowie in Puerto Orotava auf Teneriffa ausgeführter Beobachtungsreihen / E. von Rebeur-Paschwitz (in German)
- Das Horizontalpendel und seine Anwendung zur Beobachtung der absoluten und relativen Richtungs-Aenderungen der Lothlinie : Ergebnisse einiger mit Unterstützung der Königlich Preussischen Akademie der Wissenschaften in den Jahren 1889-1892 auf den Observatorien zu Wilhelmshaven und Potsdam sowie in Puerto Orotava auf Teneriffa ausgeführter Beobachtungsreihen / E. von Rebeur-Paschwitz / Halle : Blochmann, 1892 (in German)
- Über die Bewegung der Kometen im widerstehenden Mittel, mit besonderer Berücksichtigung der sonnennahen Kometen / Ernst Rebeur-Paschwitz / Berlin : Druck P. Stankiewicz, 1883 (in German)
- The Earthquake of Tokyo, April 18, 1889. Nature (1889) 40, 1030, 294-295
