= IPDS =

IPDS may refer to:

- IBM Intelligent Printer Data Stream
- Infrasonic passive differential spectroscopy
