= Seismic microzonation =

Seismic microzonation map of Greater Bangkok prepared based on predominant period of site obtained from microtremor observations

Seismic microzonation is defined as the process of subdividing a potential seismic or earthquake prone area into zones with respect to some geological and geophysical characteristics of the sites such as ground shaking, liquefaction susceptibility, landslide and rock fall hazard, earthquake-related flooding, so that seismic hazards at different locations within the area can correctly be identified. Microzonation provides the basis for site-specific risk analysis, which can assist in the mitigation of earthquake damage. In most general terms, seismic microzonation is the process of estimating the response of soil layers under earthquake excitations and thus the variation of earthquake characteristics on the ground surface.

Regional geology can have a large effect on the characteristics of ground motion. The site response of the ground motion may vary in different locations of the city according to the local geology. A seismic zonation map for a whole country may, therefore, be inadequate for detailed seismic hazard assessment of the cities. This necessitates the development of microzonation maps for big cities for detailed seismic hazard analysis. Microzonation maps can serve as a basis for evaluating site-specific risk analysis, which is essential for critical structures like nuclear power plants, subways, bridges, elevated highways, sky trains and dam sites. Seismic microzonation can be considered as the preliminary phase of earthquake risk mitigation studies. It requires multi-disciplinary contributions as well as comprehensive understanding of the effects of earthquake generated ground motions on man made structures. Many large cities around the world have put effort into developing microzonation maps for the better understanding of earthquake hazard within the cities.

== Effect of site conditions on earthquake ground motion ==
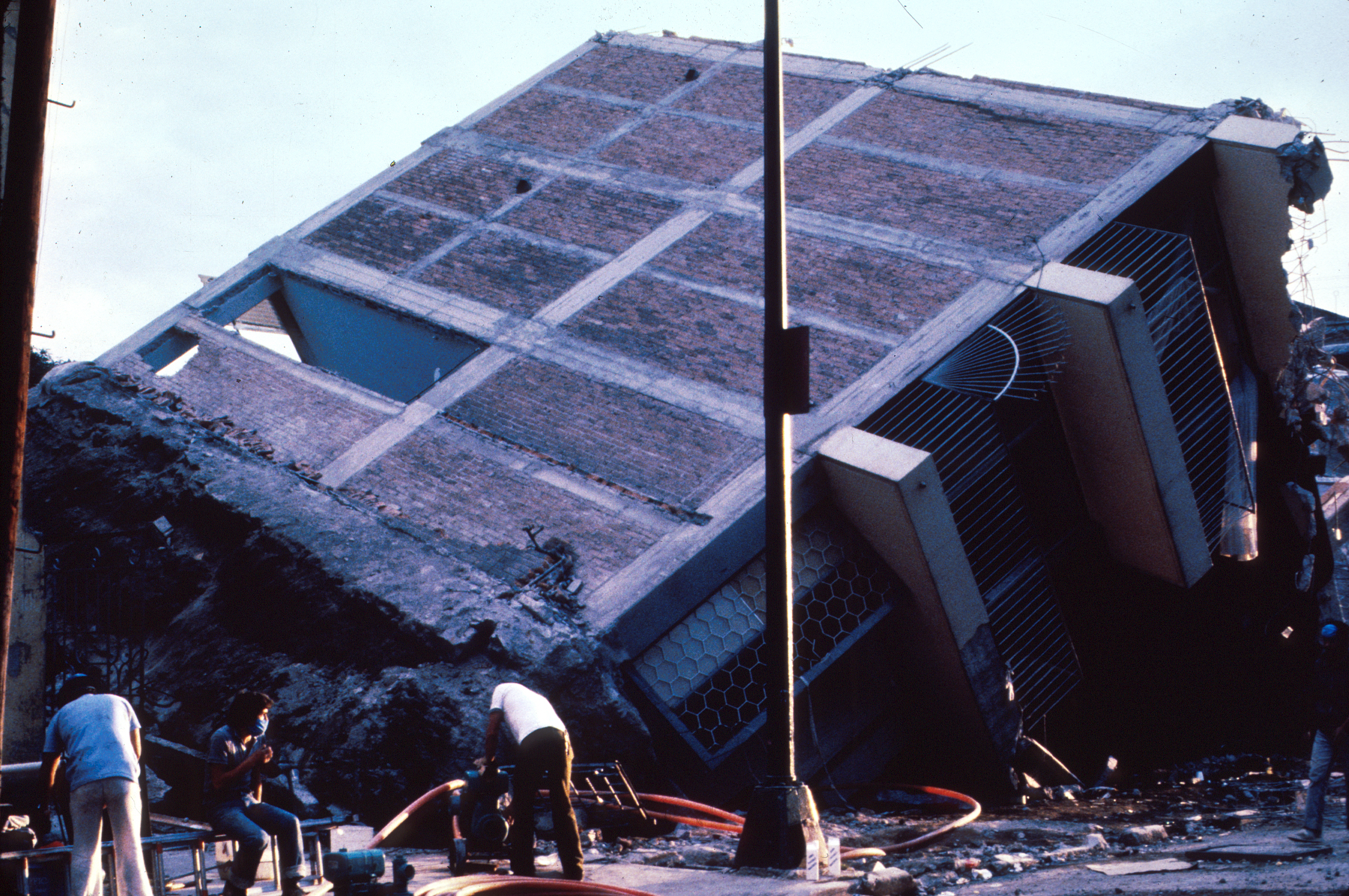
In the 1985 Mexico City earthquake, structures built on soft soil sediment sustained severe damage

It has long been recognized that the intensity of ground shaking during earthquakes and the associated damage to structures are significantly influenced by local geologic and soil conditions. Unconsolidated sediments are found to amplify ground motion during earthquakes and are hence more prone to earthquake damage than ground with hard strata. Modern cities built on soft sediments are especially vulnerable to damage caused by amplified ground motions.

The 1985 Mexico City earthquake of September 19, 1985 is a good example of earthquake damage to a modern city built on soft sediment. Though the earthquake epicenter was located around 350 km from the city, the sites with soft clay deposits exhibited a huge amplification of ground motion resulting in severe damage. Mexico City is built on a thick layer of soft soil over a hard stratum. The western part of the city is located on the edge of an old lakebed, whereas, soft clay deposits filling the former lakebed underline the eastern part. In the lake bed area, the soft clay deposits have shear wave velocities ranging from 40 to 90 m/s and the underlying hard strata has a shear wave velocity in the range 500 m/s or greater. During the earthquake of 1985, the seismic waves were trapped in the soft strata. The soft soil layer allowed the upward propagating shear waves to propagate easily; however, the hard strata at the bottom acted like a reflector and bounced back the downward propagating waves. This kind of trapping of waves created a resonance and consequently resulted in an enormous amplification of the ground motion. As a result, the lake bed area suffered catastrophic damage; however, in the southwest part of the city, ground motions were moderate and building damage was minor. The acceleration recorded in the hill-zones were relatively low-amplitude, short period ground motions compared to high amplitude and long period ground motions recorded at stations located in the lake zone.

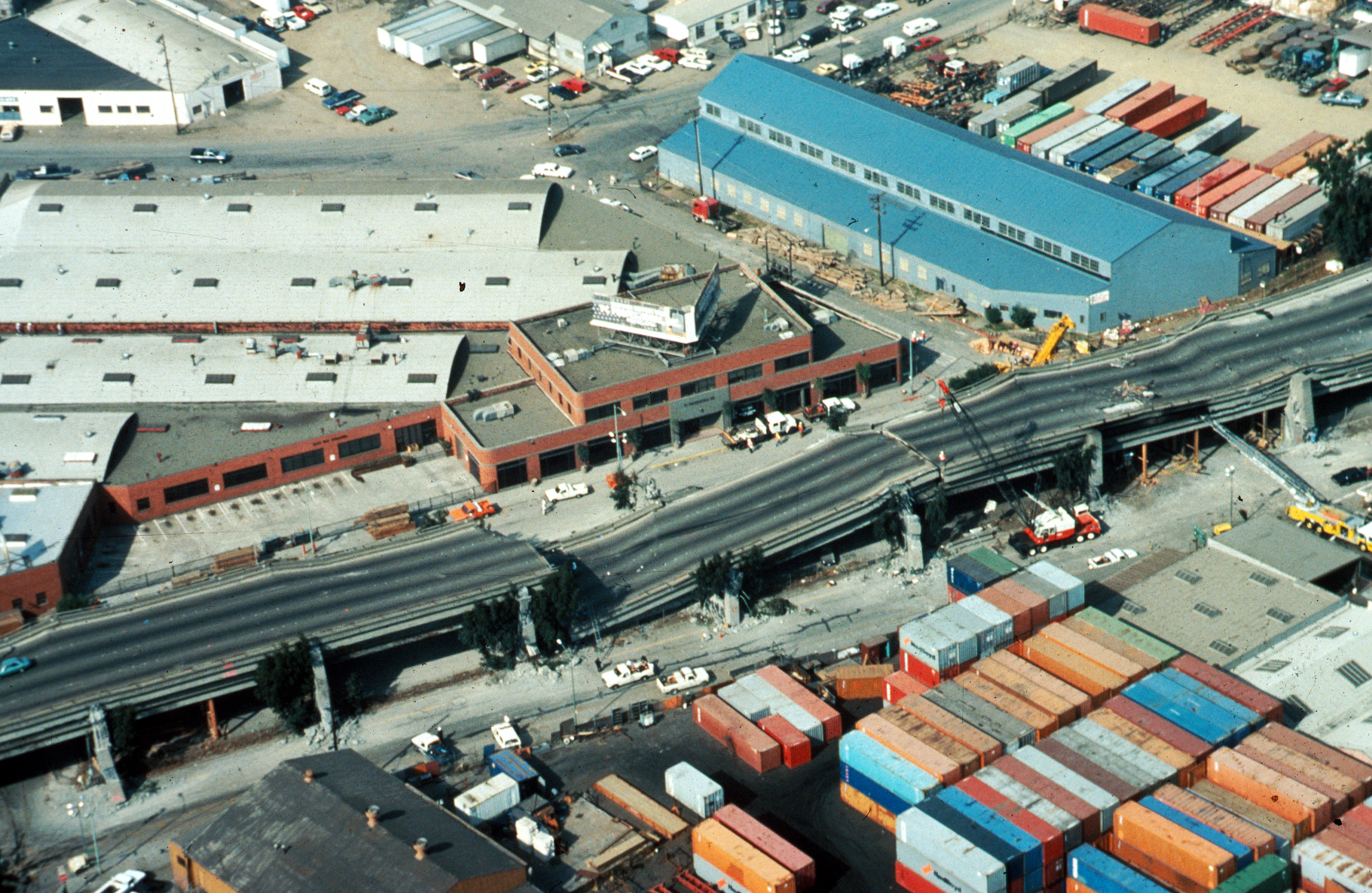
Clay deposits around the perimeter of Oakland area amplified the ground motion tremendously in the Loma Prieta earthquake in 1989

Similar kinds of site amplification of ground motion were observed in the Loma Prieta earthquake in October 1989. Deep clay deposits underlying sites around the perimeter of the San Francisco Bay area amplified the ground motion tremendously in the San Francisco and Oakland area causing severe damage. The San Francisco-Oakland Bay Bridge, founded on a deep clay site, was extensively damaged in this earthquake.

The site amplification phenomenon observed during these earthquakes clearly highlighted the possibility of severe ground motions on sites with soft soil profiles located at large distance from causative faults and underscored the importance of site specific risk analysis.

== Methods of seismic microzonation ==
Dynamic characteristics of site such as predominant period, amplification factor, shear wave velocity, standard penetration test values can be used for seismic microzonation purpose. Shear wave velocity measurement and standard penetration test are generally expensive and are not feasible to be carried out at large number of sites for the purpose of microzonation. Ambient Vibrations measurement (also called Microtremor) has become a popular method for determining the dynamic properties of soil strata and is being extensively used for microzonation. Microtremor observations are easy to perform, inexpensive and can be applied to places with low seismicity as well, hence, microtremor measurements can be used conveniently for microzonation.
