= Seismic noise =

Generic name for a relatively persistent vibration of the ground

In geophysics, geology, civil engineering, and related disciplines, seismic noise is a generic name for a relatively persistent vibration of the ground, due to a multitude of causes, that is often a non-interpretable or unwanted component of signals recorded by seismometers.

Physically, seismic noise arises primarily due to surface or near-surface sources and thus consists mostly of elastic surface waves. Low frequency waves (below 1 Hz) are commonly called microseisms and high frequency waves (above 1 Hz) are called microtremors. Primary sources of seismic waves include human activities (such as transportation or industrial activities), winds and other atmospheric phenomena, rivers, and ocean waves.

Seismic noise is relevant to any discipline that depends on seismology, including geology, oil exploration, hydrology, and earthquake engineering, and structural health monitoring. It is often called the ambient wavefield or ambient vibrations in those disciplines (however, the latter term may also refer to vibrations transmitted through air, buildings, or supporting structures.)

Seismic noise is often a nuisance for activities that are sensitive to extraneous vibrations, including earthquake monitoring and research, precision milling, telescopes, gravitational wave detectors, and crystal growing. However, seismic noise also has practical uses, including determining the low-strain and time-varying dynamic properties of civil-engineering structures, such as bridges, buildings, and dams; seismic studies of subsurface structure at many scales, often using the methods of seismic interferometry; Environmental monitoring, such as in fluvial seismology; and estimating seismic microzonation maps to characterize local and regional ground response during earthquakes.

== Causes ==
Research on the origin of seismic noise indicates that the low frequency part of the spectrum (below 1 Hz) is principally due to natural causes, chiefly ocean waves. In particular the globally observed peak between 0.1 and 0.3 Hz is clearly associated with the interaction of water waves of nearly equal frequencies but propagating in opposing directions. At high frequency (above 1 Hz), seismic noise is mainly produced by human activities such as road traffic and industrial work; but there are also natural sources, including rivers. Above 1 Hz, wind and other atmospheric phenomena can also be a major source of ground vibrations.

Anthropogenic noise detected during periods of low seismic activity includes "footquakes" from soccer fans stamping their feet in Cameroon.

Non-anthropogenic activity includes pulses at intervals between 26 and 28 seconds (0.036–0.038 Hz) centered on the Bight of Bonny in the Gulf of Guinea that are thought to be caused by reflected storm waves, focused by the African coast, acting on the relatively shallow sea-floor.

== Physical characteristics ==
The amplitude of seismic noise vibrations is typically in the order of 0.1 to 10 μm/s. High and low background noise models as a function of frequency have been evaluated globally.

Seismic noise includes a small number of body waves (P and S waves), but surface waves (Love and Rayleigh waves) predominate since they are preferentially excited by surface source processes. These waves are dispersive, meaning that their phase velocity varies with frequency (generally, it decreases with increasing frequency). Since the dispersion curve (phase velocity or slowness as a function of frequency) is related to the variations of the shear-wave velocity with depth, it can be used as a non-invasive tool to determine subsurface seismic structure and an inverse problem.

== History ==
Under normal conditions, seismic noise has very low amplitude and cannot be felt by humans, and was also too low to be recorded by most early seismometers at the end of 19th century. However, by the early 20th century, Japanese seismologist Fusakichi Omori could already record ambient vibrations in buildings, where the amplitudes are magnified. He determined building resonance frequencies and studied their evolution as a function of damage. Globally visible 30 s–5 s seismic noise was recognized early in the history of seismology as arising from the oceans, and a comprehensive theory of its generation was published by Longuet-Higgins in 1950. Rapid advances beginning around 2005 in seismic interferometry driven by theoretical, methodological, and data advances have resulted in a major renewed interest in the applications of seismic noise.

=== Civil engineering ===
After the 1933 Long Beach earthquake in California, a large experiment campaign led by D. S. Carder in 1935 recorded and analyzed ambient vibrations in more than 200 buildings. These data were used in the design codes to estimate resonance frequencies of buildings but the interest of the method went down until the 1950s. Interest on ambient vibrations in structures grew further, especially in California and Japan, thanks to the work of earthquake engineers, including G. Housner, D. Hudson, K. Kanai, T. Tanaka, and others.

In engineering, ambient vibrations were however supplanted – at least for some time – by forced vibration techniques that allow to increase the amplitudes and control the shaking source and their system identification methods. Even though M. Trifunac showed in 1972 that ambient and forced vibrations led to the same results, the interest in ambient vibration techniques only rose in the late 1990s. They have now become quite attractive, due to their relatively low cost and convenience, and to the recent improvements in recording equipment and computation methods. The results of their low-strain dynamic probing were shown to be close enough to the dynamic characteristics measured under strong shaking, at least as long as the buildings are not severely damaged.

=== Scientific study and applications in geology and geophysics ===
The recording of global seismic noise expanded widely in the 1950s with the enhancement of seismometers to monitor nuclear tests and the development of seismic arrays. The main contributions at that time for the analysis of these recordings came from the Japanese seismologist K. Aki in 1957. He proposed several methods used today for local seismic evaluation, such as Spatial Autocorrelation (SPAC), Frequency-wavenumber (FK), and correlation. However, the practical implementation of these methods was not possible at that time because of the low precision of clocks in seismic stations.

Improvements in instrumentation and algorithms led to renewed interest on those methods during the 1990s. Y. Nakamura rediscovered in 1989 the horizontal to vertical spectral ratio (H/V) method to derive the resonance frequency of sites. Assuming that shear waves dominate the microtremor, Nakamura observed that the H/V spectral ratio of ambient vibrations was roughly equal to the S wave transfer function between the ground surface and the bedrock at a site. (However, this assumption has been questioned by the SESAME project.)

In the late 1990s, array methods applied to seismic noise data started to yield ground properties in terms of shear waves velocity profiles. The European Research project SESAME (2004–2006) worked to standardize the use of seismic noise to estimate the amplification of earthquakes by local ground characteristics.

== Current uses of seismic noise ==
=== Characterization of subsurface properties ===
The analysis of the ambient vibrations and the random seismic wavefield motivates a variety of processing methods used to characterize the subsurface, including via power spectra, H/V peak analysis, dispersion curves and autocorrelation functions.

Single-station methods:

- Computation of power spectra, e.g. Passive seismic. For example, monitoring the power spectral density characteristics of ocean background microseism and Earth's very long period hum at globally and regionally distributed stations provides proxy estimates of ocean wave energy, particularly in near-shore environments, including the ocean wave attenuation properties of annually varying polar sea ice
- HVSR (H/V spectral ratio): The H/V technique is especially related to ambient vibration recordings. Bonnefoy-Claudet et al. showed that peaks in the horizontal to vertical spectral ratios can be linked to the Rayleigh ellipticity peak, the Airy phase of the Love waves and/or the SH resonance frequencies depending on the proportion of these different types of waves in the ambient noise. By chance, all these values give however approximately the same value for a given ground so that H/V peak is a reliable method to estimate the resonance frequency of the sites. For 1 sediment layer on the bedrock, this value f_{0} is related to the velocity of S waves V_{s} and the depth of the sediments H following: $f_0=\frac{V_s}{4H}$. It can therefore be used to map the bedrock depth knowing the S wave velocity. This frequency peak allows to constrain the possible models obtain using other seismic methods but is not enough to derive a complete ground model. Moreover, it has been shown that the amplitude of the H/V peak was not related to the magnitude of the amplification.

Array methods: Using an array of seismic sensors recording simultaneously the ambient vibrations allow for greater understanding of the wavefield and to derive improved images of the subsurface. In some cases, multiple arrays of different sizes may be realized and the results merged. The information of the Vertical components is only linked to the Rayleigh waves, and therefore easier to interpret, but method using the all three ground motion components are also developed, providing information about Rayleigh and Love wavefield. Seismic Interferometry methods, in particular, use correlation-based methods to estimate the seismic impulse (Green's Function) response of the Earth from background noise and have become a major area of application and research with the growth in continuously recorded high quality noise data in a wide variety of settings, ranging from the near surface to the continent scale

- FK, HRFK using the beamforming technique
- SPAC (spatial auto-correlation) method
- Correlations methods
- Refraction microtremor (ReMi)

=== Characterization of the vibration properties of civil engineering structures ===
Like earthquakes, ambient vibrations force into vibrations the civil engineering structures like bridges, buildings or dams. This vibration source is supposed by the greatest part of the used methods to be a white noise, i.e. with a flat noise spectrum so that the recorded system response is actually characteristic of the system itself. The vibrations are perceptible by humans only in rare cases (bridges, high buildings). Ambient vibrations of buildings are also caused by wind and internal sources (machines, pedestrians...) but these sources are generally not used to characterize structures. The branch that studies the modal properties of systems under ambient vibrations is called Operational modal analysis (OMA) or Output-only modal analysis and provides many useful methods for civil engineering. The observed vibration properties of structures integrate all the complexity of these structures including the load-bearing system, heavy and stiff non-structural elements (infill masonry panels...), light non-structural elements (windows...) and the interaction with the soil (the building foundation may not be perfectly fixed on the ground and differential motions may happen). This is emphasized because it is difficult to produce models able to be compared with these measurements.

Single-station methods: The power spectrum computation of ambient vibration recordings in a structure (e.g. at the top floor of a building for larger amplitudes) gives an estimation of its resonance frequencies and eventually its damping ratio.

Transfer function method: Assuming ground ambient vibrations is the excitation source of a structure, for instance a building, the Transfer Function between the bottom and the top allows to remove the effects of a non-white input. This may particularly be useful for low signal-to-noise ratio signals (small building/high level of ground vibrations). However this method generally is not able to remove the effect of soil-structure interaction.

Arrays: They consist in the simultaneous recording in several points of a structure. The objective is to obtain the modal parameters of structures: resonance frequencies, damping ratios and modal shapes for the whole structure. Notice than without knowing the input loading, the participation factors of these modes cannot a priori be retrieved. Using a common reference sensor, results for different arrays can be merged.

- Methods based on correlations

Several methods use the power spectral density matrices of simultaneous recordings, i.e. the cross-correlation matrices of these recordings in the Fourier domain. They allow to extract the operational modal parameters (Peak Picking method) that can be the results of modes coupling or the system modal parameters (Frequency Domain Decomposition method).

- System identification methods

Numerous system identification methods exist in the literature to extract the system properties and can be applied to ambient vibrations in structures.

=== Social sciences ===
The COVID-19 pandemic produced a unique situation in which human transportation, industrial, and other activities were significantly curtailed across the world, particularly in densely populated areas. An analysis of the attendant strong reductions in seismic noise at high frequencies demonstrated that these exceptional actions resulted in the longest and most prominent global anthropogenic seismic noise reduction ever observed. Seismic noise has additionally been investigated as a proxy for economic development.

== Inversion/model updating/multi-model approach ==
Direct measurements of noise properties cannot directly give information on the physical parameters (S wave velocity, structural stiffness...) of the ground structures or civil engineering structures that are typically of interest. Therefore, models are needed to compute these observations (dispersion curve, modal shapes...) in a suitable forward problem that can then be compared with the experimental data. Given the forward problem, the process of estimating the physical model can then be cast as an Inverse problem.

== Material needed ==
The acquisition chain is mainly made of a seismic sensor and a digitizer. The number of seismic stations depends on the method, from single point (spectrum, HVSR) to arrays (3 sensors and more). Three components (3C) sensors are used except in particular applications. The sensor sensitivity and corner frequency depend also on the application. For ground measurements, velocimeters are necessary since the amplitudes are generally lower than the accelerometers sensitivity, especially at low frequency. Their corner frequency depends on the frequency range of interest but corner frequencies lower than 0.2 Hz are generally used. Geophones (generally 4.5 Hz corner frequency or greater) are generally not suited. For measurements in civil engineering structures, the amplitude is generally higher as well as the frequencies of interest, allowing the use of accelerometers or velocimeters with a higher corner frequency. However, since recording points on the ground may also be of interest in such experiments, sensitive instruments may be needed. Except for single station measurements, a common time stamping is necessary for all the stations. This can be achieved by GPS clock, common start signal using a remote control or the use of a single digitizer allowing the recording of several sensors. The relative location of the recording points is needed more or less precisely for the different techniques, requiring either manual distance measurements or differential GPS location.

== Advantages and limitations ==
The advantages of ambient vibration techniques compared to active techniques commonly used in exploration geophysics or earthquake recordings used in Seismic tomography.

- Relatively cheap, non-invasive and non-destructive method
- Applicable to urban environment
- Provide valuable information with little data (e.g. HVSR)
- Dispersion curve of Rayleigh wave relatively easy to retrieve
- Provide reliable estimates of Vs30

Limitations of these methods are linked to the noise wavefield but especially to common assumptions made in seismic:

- Penetration depth depends on the array size but also on the noise quality, resolution and aliasing limits depend on the array geometry
- Complexity of the wavefield (Rayleigh, Love waves, interpretation of higher modes...)
- Plane wave assumption for most of the array methods (problem of sources within the array)
- 1D assumption of the underground structure, even though 2D was also undertaken
- Inverse problem difficult to solve as for many geophysical methods
