= Susan Hough =

American seismologist (born 1961)

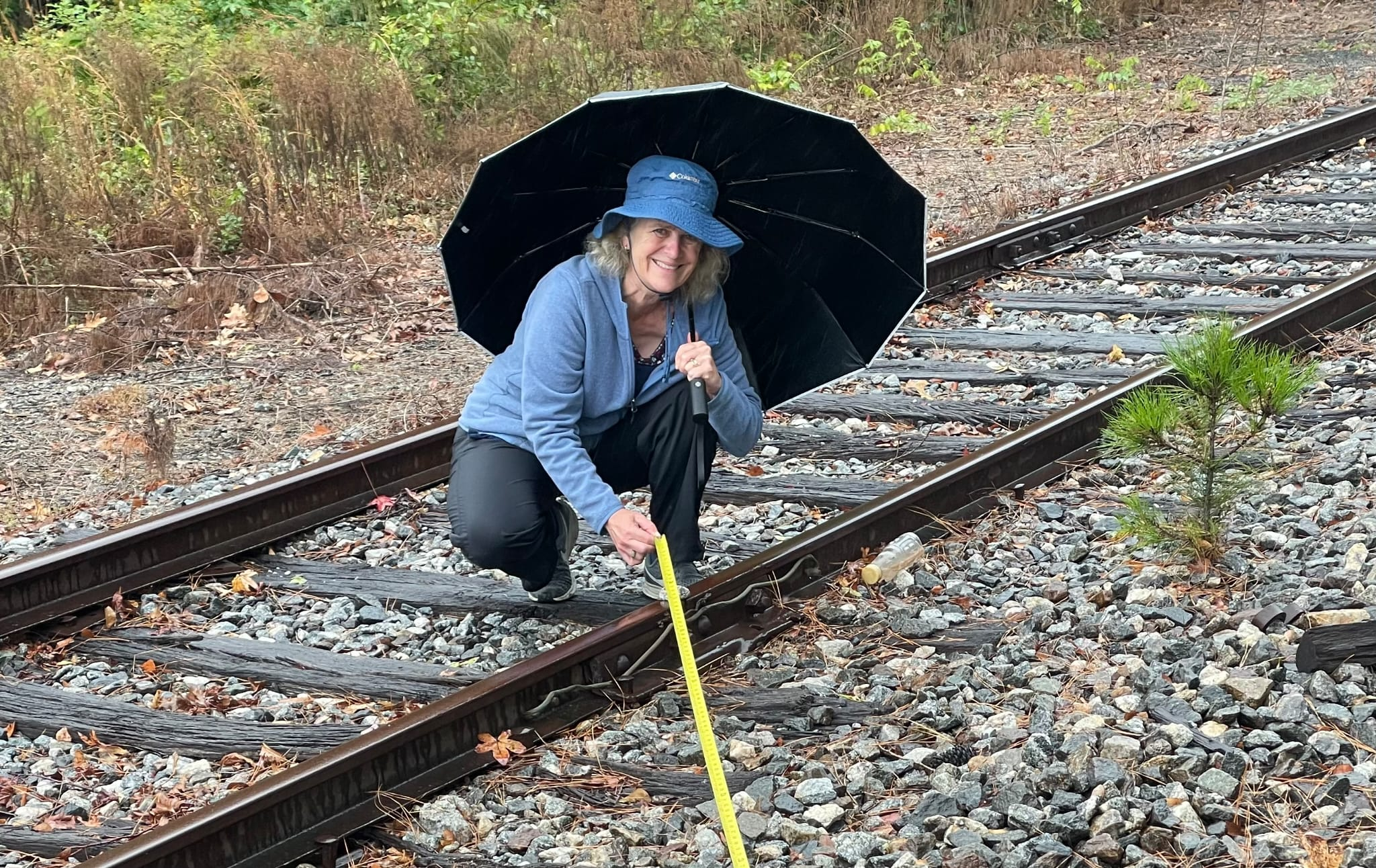
- Born: March 20, 1961 (age 65)
- Education: University of California; Scripps Institution of Oceanography
- Scientific career
- Fields: Seismology
- Workplaces: United States Geological Survey

Susan Elizabeth Hough (/hʌf/ huf) (born March 20, 1961) is a seismologist at the United States Geological Survey in Pasadena, California, and scientist in charge of the office. She has served as an editor and contributor for many journals and is a contributing editor to Geotimes Magazine. She is the author of five books, including Earthshaking Science (Princeton).

== Biography ==
Hough graduated from the University of California, Berkeley in 1982 and is a University of California, San Diego alumnus, earning her Ph.D. in geophysics from the Scripps Institution of Oceanography in 1987.

She has served on the board of directors of the Seismological Society of America from 1998 to 2004 and of the Southern California Earthquake Center from 2006 to 2009.

Subsequent to the 2010 Haiti earthquake, Hough led the United States Geological Survey team charged with the installation of seismic stations and accelerometers. The USGS are contributing to earthquake engineering efforts by improving earthquake monitoring and reporting by means of their USGS Advanced National Seismic System (ANSS). Hough and her team deployed portable seismometers for recording aftershocks of the earthquake, and she continues to cooperate with Haitian seismologosists for setting up permanent seismic monitoring in their country. Areas at risk in future earthquakes are mapped by means of seismic microzonation using local geological conditions to characterize seismic hazard. Normally, the effect of sedimentary layers are considered, however local topography is not considered in this context. However, the results provided by Hough and her team highlighted that topographic amplification played a major role in causing the earthquake damage in Pétion-Ville, a suburb of Port-au-Prince, thereby challenging the conventional view on factors to consider when performing microzonation.

Hough has written numerous articles for mainstream publications such as the Los Angeles Times. Altogether she has published over 100 articles in peer-reviewed journals.

== Publications ==
Books

- Predicting the Unpredictable: The Tumultuous Science of Earthquake Prediction (2009), Princeton University Press, ISBN 0-691-13816-8
- Richter's Scale: Measure of an Earthquake, Measure of a Man, a biography of famed seismologist Charles Richter (2007), Princeton University Press, ISBN 0-691-12807-3
- After the Earth Quakes: Elastic Rebound on an Urban Planet (2005), Oxford University Press, ISBN 0-19-517913-7
- Finding Fault in California: An Earthquake Tourist's Guide (2004), Mountain Press Publishing Company, ISBN 0-87842-495-4
- Earthshaking Science: What We Know (and Don't Know) about Earthquakes (2004), Princeton University Press, ISBN 0-691-11819-1
- The Great Quake Debate: The Crusader, the Skeptic, and the Rise of Modern Seismology (2020), University of Washington Press, ISBN 9780295747361

Articles (selection)

- Susan E. Hough, Alan Yong, Jean Robert Altidor, Dieuseul Anglade, Doug Given, Saint-Louis Mildor: Site Characterization and Site Response in Port-au-Prince, Haiti, Earthquake Spectra, Volume 27, Issue S1 (October 2011) doi:10.1193/1.3637947
- Susan Hough: Five myths about earthquakes, Washington Post, 26 August 2011
- S. Hough, J. Altidor, D. Anglade, D. Given: Localized damage caused by topographic amplification during the 2010 M7.0 Haiti earthquake, Nature Geoscience, 2010
- Susan E. Hough: Haiti is a reminder of how we can help other quake-prone areas, Los Angeles Times, February 8, 2010
- Susan Hough: Confusing Patterns with Coincidences, New York Times, 11 April 2009

== Personal life ==
Some of Hough’s later work has involved stories about so-called “ghost lanterns” along railroads, and what they can reveal about seismic activity in the area. Her connection to the railroads also reaches further back in history. Her paternal great grandfather, William R. Hough, was a train conductor who died in a 1906 railroad accident, resulting in Southern Railway having to pay $17,500 in damages to the widow, Matilda Hough.
