= Sekiya Seikei =

Japanese seismologist (1855–1896)

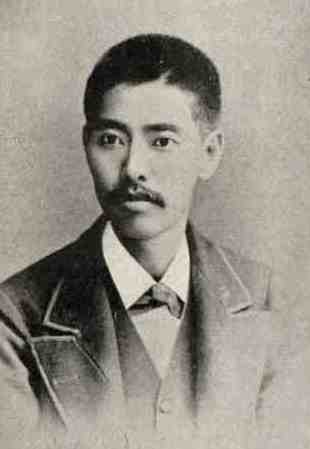
- Born: 28 January 1855; Japan
- Died: 8 January 1896 (aged 40); Japan
- Scientific career
- Fields: Geology and Seismology

Sekiya Seikei (関谷 清景; 28 January 1855 – 8 January 1896), alternatively Sekiya Kiyokage, was a Japanese geologist, one of the first seismologists, influential in establishing the study of seismology in Japan and known for his model showing the motion of an earth-particle during an earthquake.

== Career ==
Sekiya took up the study of the earthquakes in 1880. In 1886, he was appointed as the first professor of seismology at what was to be the University of Tokyo, the first such full-time university appointment in the world. In this position, he helped in the extension of the seismic survey in Japan and in the erection of seismographs throughout the country. In 1886, the number of observing stations was over 600. In 1896, at the time of his death it had risen to 968.

Outside the scientific community, Sekiya is best known for the model representing the motion of the ground during an earthquake, inspired by the Tokyo earthquake of 1887. His earthquake model consists of three twisted copper wires that are mounted side by side on a lacquered wooden stand. The wire diagram gives an illustration of the complicated movements of the ground during an earthquake, conveying the complexity of ground motion, both in terms of the vagaries of its geometric path and in its erratic accelerations. Sekiya's original copper-wire model now resides in the Whipple Museum of the History of Science at Cambridge University. According to Hudson (1992 p. 6), "His measurements and calculations of ground displacement and acceleration of the 1887 Japanese earthquake were the first estimates of ground motion based on reasonably accurate data."

After spending several months studying the new crater and the devastated areas subsequent to 1888 eruption of Mount Bandai, he published together with Y. Kikuchi a report in English (“The eruption of Bandai-san” Tokyo Imperial University College of Sciences Journal 3 (1890), pp 91–171), which is considered a classic in volcanology.
