= Seismology =

Scientific study of earthquakes and propagation of elastic waves through a planet

Animation of tsunami triggered by the 2004 Indian Ocean earthquake

Seismology (/saɪzˈmɒlədʒi, saɪs-/; from Ancient Greek σεισμός (seismós), meaning 'earthquake', and -λογία (-logía), meaning 'study of') is the scientific study of earthquakes (or generally, quakes) and the generation and propagation of elastic waves through planetary bodies. It also includes studies of the environmental effects of earthquakes such as tsunamis; other seismic sources such as volcanoes, plate tectonics, glaciers, rivers, oceanic microseisms, and the atmosphere; and artificial processes such as explosions.

Paleoseismology is a related field that uses geology to infer information regarding past earthquakes. A recording of Earth's motion as a function of time, created by a seismograph is called a seismogram. A seismologist is a scientist who works in basic or applied seismology.

== History ==
=== Ancient and classical eras ===
Scholarly interest in earthquakes can be traced back to antiquity. Early speculations on the natural causes of earthquakes were included in the writings of Thales of Miletus (c. 585 BCE), Anaximenes of Miletus (c. 550 BCE), Aristotle (c. 340 BCE), and Zhang Heng (132 CE).

In 132 CE, Zhang Heng of China's Han dynasty designed the first known seismoscope.

=== Beginnings of modern science ===
In the 17th century, Athanasius Kircher argued that earthquakes were caused by the movement of fire within a system of channels inside the Earth. Martin Lister (1638–1712) and Nicolas Lemery (1645–1715) proposed that earthquakes were caused by chemical explosions within the Earth.

The Lisbon earthquake of 1755, coinciding with the general flowering of science in Europe, set in motion intensified scientific attempts to understand the behaviour and causation of earthquakes. The earliest responses include work by John Bevis (1757) and John Michell (1761). Michell determined that earthquakes originate within the Earth and were waves of movement caused by "shifting masses of rock miles below the surface".

In response to a series of earthquakes near Comrie in Scotland in 1839, a committee was formed in the United Kingdom in order to produce better detection methods for earthquakes. The outcome of this was the production of one of the first modern seismometers by James David Forbes, first presented in a report by David Milne-Home in 1842. This seismometer was an inverted pendulum, which recorded the measurements of seismic activity through the use of a pencil placed on paper above the pendulum. The designs provided did not prove effective, according to Milne's reports.

From 1857, Robert Mallet laid the foundation of modern instrumental seismology and carried out seismological experiments using explosives. He is also responsible for coining the word "seismology". He is widely considered to be the "Father of Seismology".

In 1889 Ernst von Rebeur-Paschwitz recorded the first teleseismic earthquake signal (an earthquake in Japan recorded at Pottsdam Germany).

In 1894 Fusakichi Omori demonstrated that the frequency of earthquake aftershocks decays following a mainshock, based on his analysis of the 1889 Kumamoto, 1891 Mino–Owari and the 1893 Kagoshima earthquakes.

In 1897, Emil Wiechert's theoretical calculations led him to conclude that the Earth's interior consists of a mantle of silicates, surrounding a core of iron.

In 1906 Richard Dixon Oldham identified the separate arrival of P waves, S waves and surface waves on seismograms and found the first clear evidence that the Earth has a central core.

In 1909, Andrija Mohorovičić, one of the founders of modern seismology, discovered and defined the Mohorovičić discontinuity. Usually referred to as the "Moho discontinuity" or the "Moho", it is the boundary between the Earth's crust and the mantle. It is defined by the distinct change in velocity of seismological waves as they pass through changing densities of rock.

In 1910, after studying the April 1906 San Francisco earthquake, Harry Fielding Reid put forward the "elastic rebound theory" which remains the foundation for modern tectonic studies. The development of this theory depended on the considerable progress of earlier independent streams of work on the behavior of elastic materials and in mathematics.

An early scientific study of aftershocks from a destructive earthquake came after the January 1920 Xalapa earthquake. An 80 kg (180 lb) Wiechert seismograph was brought to the Mexican city of Xalapa by rail after the earthquake. The instrument was deployed to record its aftershocks. Data from the seismograph would eventually determine that the mainshock was produced along a shallow crustal fault.

In 1926, Harold Jeffreys was the first to claim, based on his study of earthquake waves, that below the mantle, the core of the Earth is liquid.

In 1937, Inge Lehmann determined that within Earth's liquid outer core there is a solid inner core.

In 1950, Michael S. Longuet-Higgins elucidated the ocean processes responsible for the global background seismic microseism.

By the 1960s, Earth science had developed to the point where a comprehensive theory of the causation of seismic events and geodetic motions had come together in the now well-established theory of plate tectonics.

== Types of seismic wave ==
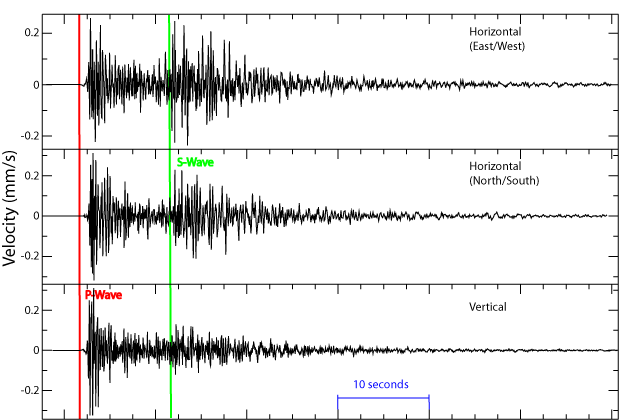
Seismogram records showing the three components of ground motion. The red line marks the first arrival of P waves; the green line, the later arrival of S waves.

Seismic waves are elastic waves that propagate in solid or fluid materials. They can be divided into body waves that travel through the interior of the materials; surface waves that travel along surfaces or interfaces between materials; and normal modes, a form of standing wave.

=== Body waves ===
There are two types of body waves, pressure waves or primary waves (P waves) and shear or secondary waves (S waves). P waves are longitudinal waves associated with compression and expansion, and involve particle motion parallel to the direction of wave propagation. P waves are always the first waves to appear on a seismogram as they are the waves that travel fastest through solids. S waves are transverse waves associated with shear, and involve particle motion perpendicular to the direction of wave propagation. S waves travel more slowly than P waves so they appear later than P waves on a seismogram. Because of their low shear strength, fluids cannot support transverse elastic waves, so S waves travel only in solids.

=== Surface waves ===
Surface waves are the result of P and S waves interacting with the surface of the Earth. These waves are dispersive, meaning that different frequencies have different velocities. The two main surface wave types are Rayleigh waves, which have both compressional and shear motions, and Love waves, which are purely shear. Rayleigh waves result from the interaction of P waves and vertically polarized S waves with the surface and can exist in any solid medium. Love waves are formed by horizontally polarized S waves interacting with the surface, and can only exist if there is a change in the elastic properties with depth in a solid medium, which is always the case in seismological applications. Surface waves travel more slowly than P waves and S waves because they are the result of these waves traveling along indirect paths to interact with Earth's surface. Because they travel along the surface of the Earth, their energy decays less rapidly than body waves (1/distance^{2} vs. 1/distance^{3}), and thus the shaking caused by surface waves is generally stronger than that of body waves, and the primary surface waves are often thus the largest signals on earthquake seismograms. Surface waves are strongly excited when their source is close to the surface, as in a shallow earthquake or a near-surface explosion, and are much weaker for deep earthquake sources.

=== Normal modes ===
Both body and surface waves are traveling waves; however, large earthquakes can also make the entire Earth "ring" like a resonant bell. This ringing is a mixture of normal modes with discrete frequencies and periods of approximately an hour or shorter. Normal-mode motion caused by a very large earthquake can be observed for up to a month after the event. The first observations of normal modes were made in the 1960s as the advent of higher-fidelity instruments coincided with two of the largest earthquakes of the 20th century, the 1960 Valdivia earthquake and the 1964 Alaska earthquake. Since then, the normal modes of the Earth have given us some of the strongest constraints on the deep structure of the Earth.

== Earthquakes ==
One of the first attempts at the scientific study of earthquakes followed the 1755 Lisbon earthquake. Other earthquakes that spurred major advancements in the science of seismology include the 1857 Basilicata earthquake, the 1906 San Francisco earthquake, the 1964 Alaska earthquake, the 2004 Sumatra-Andaman earthquake, and the 2011 Great East Japan earthquake.

== Controlled seismic sources ==
Seismic waves produced by explosions or vibrating controlled sources are one of the primary methods of underground exploration in geophysics (in addition to many different electromagnetic methods such as induced polarization and magnetotellurics). Controlled-source seismology has been used to map salt domes, anticlines and other geologic traps in petroleum-bearing rocks, faults, rock types, and long-buried giant meteor craters. For example, the Chicxulub Crater, which was caused by an impact that has been implicated in the extinction of the dinosaurs, was localized to Central America by analyzing ejecta in the Cretaceous–Paleogene boundary, and then physically proven to exist using seismic maps from oil exploration.

== Detection of seismic waves ==
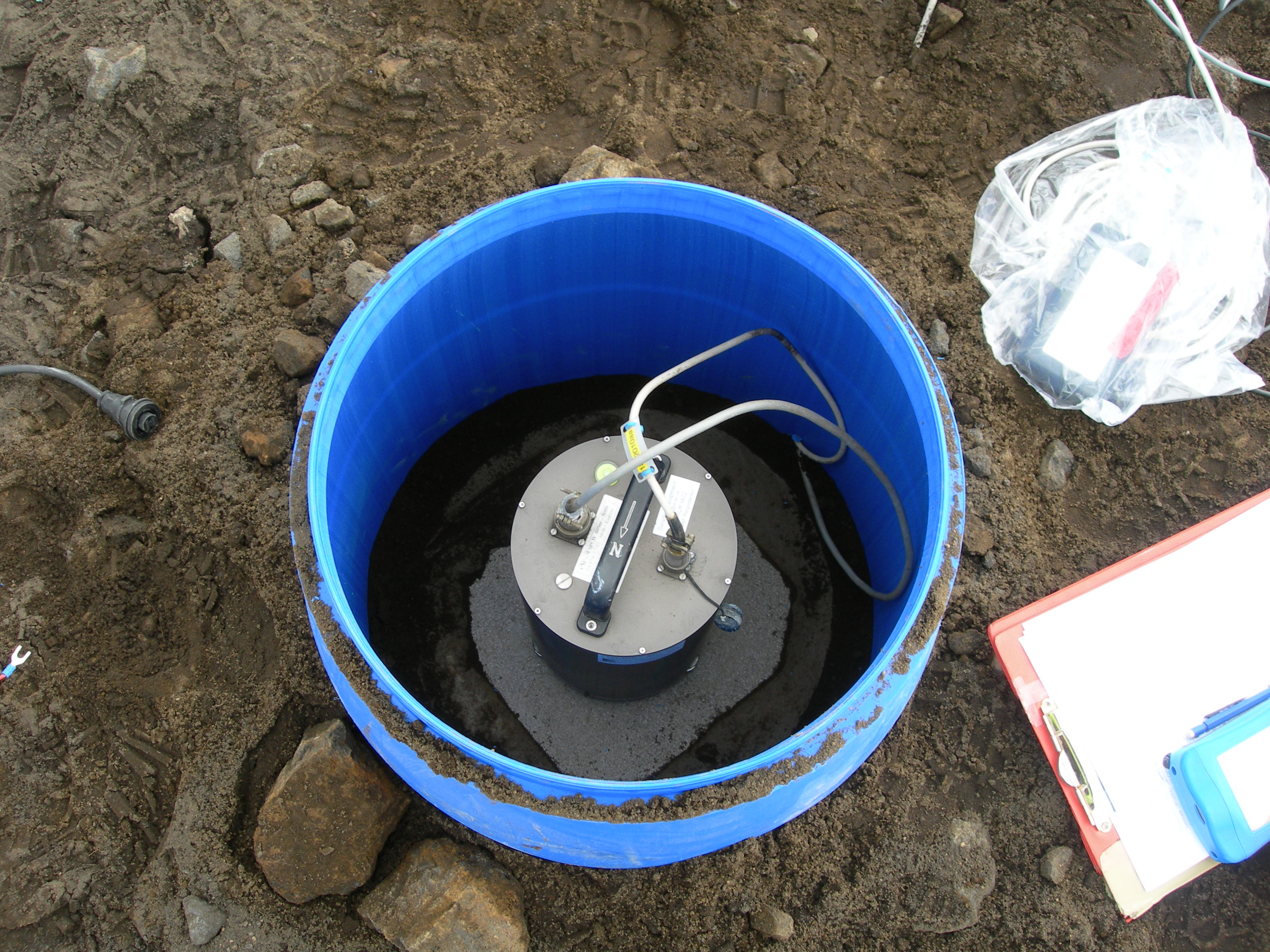
Installation for a temporary seismic station, north Iceland highland.

Seismometers are sensors that detect and record the motion of the Earth arising from elastic waves. Seismometers may be deployed at the Earth's surface, in shallow vaults, in boreholes, or underwater. A complete instrument package that records seismic signals is called a seismograph. Networks of seismographs continuously record ground motions around the world to facilitate the monitoring and analysis of global earthquakes and other sources of seismic activity. Locating an earthquake's epicenter is done by trilateration with at least three seismometers. Rapid location of earthquakes makes tsunami warnings possible because seismic waves travel considerably faster than tsunami waves.

Seismometers also record signals from non-earthquake sources ranging from explosions (nuclear and chemical), to local noise from wind or anthropogenic activities, to incessant signals generated at the ocean floor and coasts induced by ocean waves (the global microseism), to cryospheric events associated with large icebergs and glaciers. Above-ocean meteor strikes with energies as high as 4.2 × 10^{13} J (equivalent to that released by an explosion of ten kilotons of TNT) have been recorded by seismographs, as have a number of industrial accidents and terrorist bombs and events (a field of study referred to as forensic seismology). A major long-term motivation for the global seismographic monitoring has been for the detection and study of nuclear testing.

== Mapping Earth's interior ==
Seismic velocities and boundaries in the interior of the Earth sampled by seismic waves

Because seismic waves commonly propagate efficiently as they interact with the internal structure of the Earth, they provide high-resolution noninvasive methods for studying the planet's interior. One of the earliest important discoveries (suggested by Richard Dixon Oldham in 1906 and definitively shown by Harold Jeffreys in 1926) was that the outer core of the earth is liquid. Since S waves do not pass through liquids, the liquid core causes a "shadow" on the side of the planet opposite the earthquake where no direct S waves are observed. In addition, P waves travel much slower through the outer core than the mantle.

Processing readings from many seismometers using seismic tomography, seismologists have mapped the mantle of the earth to a resolution of several hundred kilometers. This has enabled scientists to identify convection cells and other large-scale features such as the large low-shear-velocity provinces near the core–mantle boundary.

== Seismology and society ==
=== Earthquake prediction ===
Public controversy over earthquake prediction erupted after Italian authorities indicted six seismologists and one government official for manslaughter in connection with a magnitude 6.3 earthquake in L'Aquila, Italy on April 5, 2009. A report in Nature stated that the indictment was widely seen in Italy and abroad as being for failing to predict the earthquake and drew condemnation from the American Association for the Advancement of Science and the American Geophysical Union. However, the magazine also indicated that the population of Aquila do not consider the failure to predict the earthquake to be the reason for the indictment, but rather the alleged failure of the scientists to evaluate and communicate risk. The indictment claims that, at a special meeting in L'Aquila the week before the earthquake occurred, scientists and officials were more interested in pacifying the population than providing adequate information about earthquake risk and preparedness.

In locations where a historical record exists it may be used to estimate the timing, location and magnitude of future seismic events. There are several interpretative factors to consider. The epicentres or foci and magnitudes of historical earthquakes are subject to interpretation meaning it is possible that 5–6 Mw earthquakes described in the historical record could be larger events occurring elsewhere that were felt moderately in the populated areas that produced written records. Documentation in the historic period may be sparse or incomplete, and not give a full picture of the geographic scope of an earthquake, or the historical record may only have earthquake records spanning a few centuries, a very short time frame in a seismic cycle.

=== Engineering seismology ===
Engineering seismology is the study and application of seismology for engineering purposes. It generally applied to the branch of seismology that deals with the assessment of the seismic hazard of a site or region for the purposes of earthquake engineering. It is, therefore, a link between earth science and civil engineering. There are two principal components of engineering seismology. Firstly, studying earthquake history (e.g. historical and instrumental catalogs of seismicity) and tectonics to assess the earthquakes that could occur in a region and their characteristics and frequency of occurrence. Secondly, studying strong ground motions generated by earthquakes to assess the expected shaking from future earthquakes with similar characteristics. These strong ground motions could either be observations from accelerometers or seismometers or those simulated by computers using various techniques, which are then often used to develop ground-motion prediction equations (or ground-motion models).

== Tools ==
Seismological instruments can generate large amounts of data. Systems for processing such data include:

- CUSP (Caltech-USGS Seismic Processing)
- RadExPro seismic software
- SeisComP3

== List of seismologists ==
- Aki, Keiiti
- Ambraseys, Nicholas
- Anderson, Don L.
- Bolt, Bruce
- Beroza, Gregory
- Claerbout, Jon
- Dziewonski, Adam Marian
- Ewing, Maurice
- Galitzine, Boris Borisovich
- Gamburtsev, Grigory A.
- Gutenberg, Beno
- Hough, Susan
- Jeffreys, Harold
- Jones, Lucy
- Kanamori, Hiroo
- Keilis-Borok, Vladimir
- Knopoff, Leon
- Lehmann, Inge
- Macelwane, James
- Mallet, Robert
- Mercalli, Giuseppe
- Milne, John
- Mohorovičić, Andrija
- Oldham, Richard Dixon
- Omori, Fusakichi
- Sebastião de Melo, Marquis of Pombal
- Press, Frank
- Rautian, Tatyana G.
- Richards, Paul G.
- Richter, Charles Francis
- Sekiya, Seikei
- Sieh, Kerry
- Paul G. Silver
- Stein, Ross
- Tucker, Brian
- Vidale, John
- Wen, Lianxing
- Winthrop, John
- Zhang Heng

== See also ==
- Asteroseismology – Study of oscillations in stars (starquakes)
- Cryoseism – Non-tectonic seismic event
- Earthquake swarm – Series of localized seismic events within a short time period
- Engineering geology – Application of geology to engineering practice
- Epicentral distance
- Harmonic tremor – Ground vibration associated with volcanic activity
- Helioseismology – Study of the structure and dynamics of the Sun through its oscillation
- IRIS Consortium – Former research group using seismographic data
- Isoseismal map – Type of map used in seismology
- Linear seismic inversion – Interpretation of seismic data using linear model
- Lunar seismology – Study of ground motions of the Moon
- Marsquake – Seismic event occurring on Mars
- Quake (natural phenomenon) – Surface shaking on interstellar bodies in general
- Seismic interferometry
- Seismic loading
- Seismic migration – Measurement process
- Seismic noise – Generic name for a relatively persistent vibration of the ground
- Seismic performance analysis – Study of the response of buildings and structures to earthquakes
- Seismic velocity structure – Seismic wave velocity variation
- Seismite – Sediment/structure shaken seismically
- Seismo-electromagnetics – Electro-magnetic phenomena
- Seismotectonics
- Stabilized inverse Q filtering – Data processing technology
