= 350 Complutum earthquake =

Earthquake in Iberia

- Location within Spain
- Local date: circa 350 CE
- Magnitude: 5.5–6.6 M_{w}
- Epicenter: 40.42°N 3.46°W
- Fault: Henares Valley Fault Zone

Around the 4th century CE, there was an earthquake in Complutum (nowadays Alcalá de Henares) in Roman Hispania. The earthquake was located in the Tagus Basin, with an assumed magnitude of M_{w} 5.0–6.6. This earthquake subsequently led to the destruction and abandonment of Complutum. The earthquake had an estimated maximum intensity of IX on the ESI-07 scale.

== Geology ==
Alcalá de Henares is located within the Henares Valley Fault Zone (NE–SW) on the Tagus Basin, with rivers such as Jarama, Henares and Manzanares flowing through the Madrid Metropolitan Region. It does not see strong earthquakes with a slow average slip-rate of 1mm/yr but contains other fault lines such as the Albalate-Perzuera Fault Line, Jarama Valley Fault and Henares Fault Zone.

Past earthquakes in the Basin include those in 1922, 1954, 1982 and 2007.

Complutum is located within Haplic Calcisols, a type of soil containing limes within alluvial disposals, meaning soil around it is soft enough to amplify and cause liquefaction. This is mainly due to the Henares River flowing through Complutum, enriching the soil with clay-like soils.

== Evidence ==
Researchers from CSIC/IGME had researched the geological structures in La Magdalena archeological site, with signs of liquefaction. The earthquake also left extensive evidence of anomalies such as notable ground disruptions, sand ejections, gravel injections and metre-size open craters, affecting Roman industrial buildings and tombs.

The earthquake was estimated to have a magnitude of 5.0–6.6 due to the minimum empirical limit of seismically-induced liquefaction and a maximum surface-rupture from the Henares Valley Fault Zone.

Archeological evidence also pinpoints to various desertions from towns linking to EAE's from the earthquake.

== See also ==
- List of earthquakes in Spain
- List of historical earthquakes
