= Gerhard Müller (geophysicist) =

- Born: November 25, 1940; Swabian Jura, Nazi Germany
- Died: July 9, 2002 (aged 61)
- Scientific career
- Fields: Geophysics

Gerhard Müller (November 25, 1940 – July 9, 2002) was a German geophysicist who specialized in seismology.

Gerhard Müller was born in 1940 at the foot of the Swabian Alps, in Schwäbisch Gmünd, Germany. He studied geophysics at the University of Mainz, graduating in 1965. He then moved to the Clausthal University of Technology, where he served as scientific assistant from 1965 to 1969, and earned his Ph.D. in 1967. In 1969, he served at the Geophysical Institute at the University of Karlsruhe with Karl Fuchs. Between 1971 and 1972 worked at the IBM Thomas J. Watson Research Center in Yorktown Heights, New Jersey and then at the Lamont–Doherty Earth Observatory of Columbia University. From 1979 until the end of his life, Müller was Professor of Mathematical Geophysics at the Institute of Meteorology and Geophysics at the Goethe University Frankfurt. In the 1980s, he worked with Walter Zürn on experiments on Newton's law of universal gravitation.

Since 1981, Gerhard Müller was also associate editor of Geophysical Journal International. In 1997 he was awarded the Emil Wiechert Medal.

== Publications ==
- Karl Fuchs, Gerhard Müller: "Computation of Synthetic Seismograms with the Reflectivity Method and Comparison with Observations", Geophys. J. Roy. Astron. Soc., vol. 21, 1971, p. 261-283
