= Jon Claerbout =

American geophysicist and seismologist

Jon F. Claerbout (born February 14, 1938) is an American geophysicist and seismologist. He is the Cecil Green Professor Emeritus of Geophysics at Stanford University. Since the later half of the 20th century, he has been a leading researcher and pioneered the use of computers in processing and filtering seismic exploration data, eventually developing the field of time series analysis and seismic interferometry, modelling the propagation of seismic waves.

== Career ==
Claerbout obtained a BS in physics in 1960, a MS in geophysics in 1963 and a PhD in geophysics in 1967, all from the Massachusetts Institute of Technology. His BS thesis was titled A rubidium vapor magnetometer. He worked with Stephen M. Simpson Jr. for his MS thesis, titled Digital filters and applications to seismic detection and discrimination. The publication of this work made many geophysicists, including those in the oil and gas industry, well aware of Claerbout's potential. However, Claerbout found the sparse availability and low quality of earthquake seismic data frustrating and decided to study atmospheric gravity waves during his PhD. His advisor was Theodore R. Madden and the title of his thesis was Electromagnetic Effects of Atmospheric Gravity Waves.

Claerbout is the founder of the Stanford Exploration Project (SEP), the first geophysical research consortium funded by the oil and gas industry. Claerbout has been a doctoral advisor to many of influential geophysicists who joined SEP such as Oz Yilmaz and Biondo Biondi.

The term and concept of exploding reflectors in reflection seismology is often attributed to Jon Claerbout. However, Claerbout claims that the term was coined by John Sherwood, a geophysicist from Chevron who introduced him to exploration geophysics. John Sherwood has said that he only used the term to refer to Claerbout's innovative method of seismic migration.

He was one of the first scientists to emphasize that computational methods threaten the reproducibility of research unless open access is provided to both the data and the software underlying a publication.

Claerbout's books have been among the most read and cited in geophysical research, especially Fundamentals of Geophysical Data Processing and Imaging the Earth's Interior, which have been translated into Chinese and Russian among other languages. He has since made all his books available for free download from his website.

== Awards and honors ==
In 1988, Claerbout was elected a member of the National Academy of Engineering for original and pioneering studies that revolutionized seismic wave analysis and greatly aided the international search for petroleum.

He is the youngest ever recipient of the Maurice Ewing Medal of the Society of Exploration Geophysicists, having received this award in 1992 for lifetime achievements when he was in his early fifties.

Asteroid 156990 Claerbout, discovered by Joseph A. Dellinger at George Observatory in 2003, was named in his honor. The official naming citation was published by the Minor Planet Center on 17 May 2011 (M.P.C. 75105).
