= Fluvial seismology =

Use of seismological methods to understand river processes

Fluvial seismology is the application of seismological methods to understand river processes, such as discharge, erosion, and streambed evolution. Flowing water and the movement of sediments along the streambed generate elastic (seismic) waves that propagate into the surrounding Earth materials. Seismometers can record these signals, which can be analyzed to illuminate different fluvial processes such as turbulent water flow and bedload transport. Seismic methods have been used to observe discharge values that range from single-digits up through tens of thousands of cubic feet per second (cfs).

An experiment in 1990 in the Italian Alps was one of the earliest to demonstrate that seismometers could detect discernible fluvial signals within the seismic noise generated by flow. Six seismometers recorded average velocity of ground oscillations along an alpine river that was also monitored for discharge and bedload with a sediment trap. They determined the lowest flow values require to initiate and maintain bedload transport. Since then, fluvial seismology has become a rapidly growing area of research.

Fluvial seismology is a sub-discipline of environmental seismology, a relatively young field in which unconventional seismic signals can be detected within what was previously considered ‘noise’. Seismic noise is found across the full spectrum of frequencies studied in seismology (0.001–100 Hz). While traditional seismology is concerned with tectonic earthquakes and the structure of the solid earth, environmental seismology is concerned with waves that originate from outside the solid earth or whose signal is affected by environmental conditions (temperature, hydrology). The principles of fluvial and environmental seismology can be applied to all sorts of surficial processes, including debris flows, landslides, lahars, glacial movement and icequakes, etc.

== Applications ==
Bedload transport is among the most efficient means of erosion and plays a dominant role in river evolution and morphology. Understanding the forces that a river and the sediment it transports exert on the streambed are a key component of river morphological evolution. High-flow, high-energy storm and flooding events in particular have an outsize effect on stream morphology and development. Some applications of fluvial seismology include:

- Civil engineering, river-restoration and design of riverine and flood-control structures. Bedload transport can cause lots of damage during large flood events and structures must be designed to withstand them.
- Public safety: telemetered seismic data can be used for remote continuous monitoring, to forewarn down-stream communities of potentially dangerous and catastrophic floods
- Research: understanding of sediment transport, calculating rates and means of streambed incision, geomorphology, evolution of river over time, understand/quantify river erosion

== Signals ==
Fluvial seismology is generally confined to high-frequency seismic noise with a frequency > 1 Hz (period < 1 s). Observations concern the 1–100 Hz range, which a theoretical forward model of seismic wave generation shows that turbulent water flow across a riverbed generates.

Observations are generally made less than 100 m from the shore of the river but one study shows distinct river signals from 2 km away. Deploying seismometers at different distances from the river can be helpful in distinguishing signal sources.

The two main signals that have thus far been extracted from seismic noise generated by rivers are 1) the turbulent flow of water and 2) bedload transport of sediments. Other proposed signals include interaction of the water surface with air. Others suggest that further analysis may be able to discriminate between types of bedload transport – saltation vs shearing.

Generally speaking, studies have found that the signal due to turbulent water flow is lower-frequency than that of bedload transport. For example, one study found that while discharge and water level were correlated with a signal from 1–80 Hz, the relationship was particularly strong in the 2–5 Hz and 10–15 Hz windows. Meanwhile, the 30–50 Hz signal was attributed to bedload transport.

=== Hysteresis ===
Hysteresis is a well-documented phenomenon observed in the seismic observation of rivers in which the same discharge does not always produce the same seismic signal. If water turbulence were only source of seismic signals, the same discharge would always produce the same amplitude of the seismic response.

Hysteresis has been observed over timescales of hours (single storms) to full years. Hysteresis has been observed in fluvial systems in both clockwise and counterclockwise forms, though clockwise is much more common. Clockwise hysteresis is often attributed to changes in bedload transport, with a larger seismic signal observed on the rising arm of the discharge curve than on the falling arm.

Hysteresis is most often attributed to changing amount of sediment transported by the river. But while hysteresis is characteristic of the effect of bedload transport in gravel-bed rivers, it is not necessarily caused by bedload transport alone. Furthermore, not all bedload transport necessarily produces hysteresis. Hysteresis may also be caused by changing turbulent flow as the result of changing river morphology, such as changing surface roughness of the streambed.

== Improvements ==
Methods of fluvial seismology provide a means for continuous indirect observations of phenomena that are 1) difficult and dangerous to measure, 2) infrequent, and 3) estimated or poorly constrained. For example, bedload transport is difficult to measure directly while also dangerous during high-flow conditions. As a result, observations may be infrequent and limited to low-discharge conditions only, when high-flow conditions are of particular importance to stream evolution. Estimations may be limited to lab-conducted, empirically derived flume experiments.

The use of seismology to understand fluvial processes is an improvement on several existing methods (such as sediment traps, direct sampling, impact plates or geophones buried in streambed) because

1. recordings can be made completely outside the channel, which makes observations
  - non-invasive and the observation methods do not affect flow or natural conditions
  - easier and more time-efficient
  - safer, particularly during high-volume flood events, which are of particular interest and have an outsized effect on morphology
  - cost effective by avoiding the heightened risk of losing in-stream instruments during collection
2. recordings are continuous and allow for monitoring across timescales of a single storm/flood event to multi-year.
3. can be deployed and monitored remotely. For example, in areas at high flood risk telemetered seismic data can be used to forewarn down-stream communities of potentially dangerous and catastrophic floods (in a way akin to earthquake detection and warning).
