= Georg Gerland =

German geographer

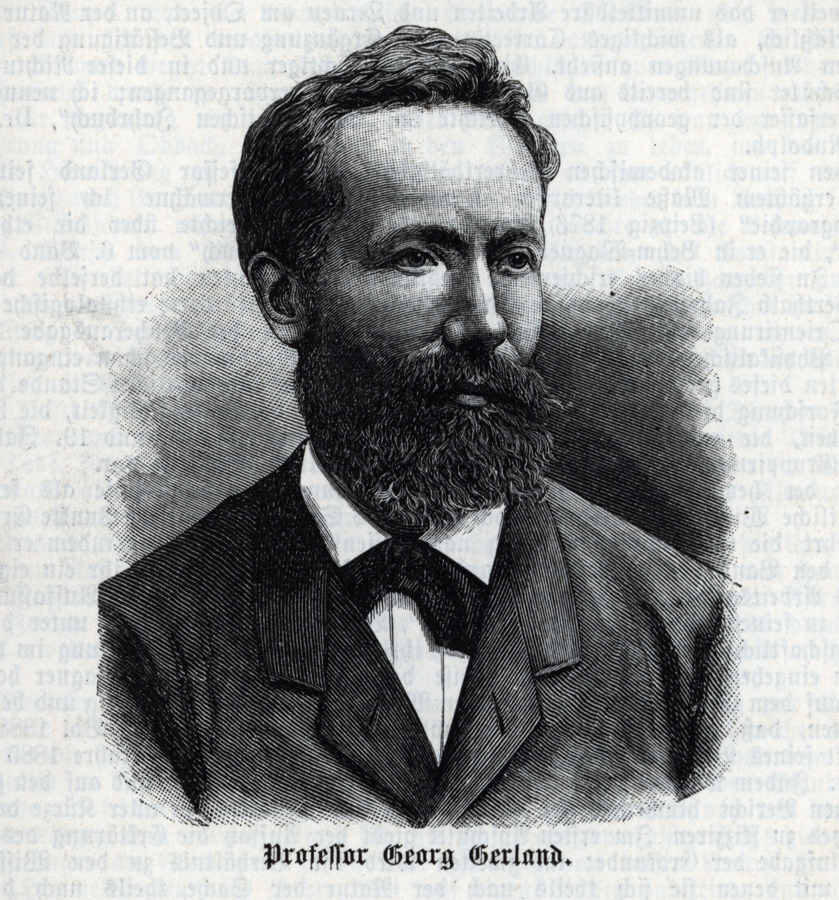
Georg Gerland

Georg Cornelius Karl Gerland (29 January 1833, in Kassel – 16 February 1919, in Strasbourg) was a German anthropologist and geophysicist.

He studied classical philology, Germanistics and anthropology at the universities of Berlin and Marburg. From 1856 to 1875 he successively worked as a gymnasium teacher in Kassel, Hanau, Magdeburg and Halle an der Saale, and in 1875 was named a professor of ethnology and geography at the University of Strasbourg. In 1900 he became director of the Imperial Central Bureau for Earthquake Research in Strasbourg.

Gerland presented ideas of Germal seismologist Ernst von Rebeur-Paschwitz at the sixth International Geographic Conference in London in 1895, and organized the first International Conference of Seismology in Strasbourg in 1901. It was the start of international cooperation in seismology and led to the founding two years later of the International Seismological Association (since 1951 the International Association of Seismology and Physics of the Earth’s Interior (IASPEI)).

== Published works ==
From 1887 onward, he edited the Beiträge zur Geophysik, a journal of geophysics eventually known as Gerlands Beiträge zur Geophysik. After the death of Theodor Waitz, he edited and published the last two volumes of Waitz's Die Anthropologie der Naturvölker (6 volumes, 1859–65). In addition, he was the author of a handful of biographies in the Allgemeine Deutsche Biographie. Other written efforts by Gerland include:

- Der altgriechische Dativ, zunächst des Singularis, 1859 – The ancient Greek dative.
- Ueber Goethe's historische Stellung; eine Abhandlung, 1865 – On Goethe's historical position.
- Altgriechische märchen in der Odyssee, ein beitrag zur vergleichenden mythologie, 1869 – Ancient Greek fairy tale in the Odyssey.
- Intensiva und Iterativa und ihr Verhältnis zu einander : eine sprachwiszenschaftliche Abhandlung, 1869 – Intensiva and Iterativa and their relation to one another.
- Anthropologische Beiträge, 1875 – Anthropological contributions.
- Immanuel Kant : seine geographischen und anthropologischen Arbeiten, 1906 – Immanuel Kant, his geographical and anthropological works.
- Der Mythus von der Sintflut, 1912 – The flood myth.
