= Seismic interferometry =

Interferometry examines the general interference phenomena between pairs of signals in order to gain useful information about the subsurface. Seismic interferometry (SI) utilizes the crosscorrelation of signal pairs to reconstruct the impulse response of a given media. Papers by Keiiti Aki (1957), Géza Kunetz, and Jon Claerbout (1968) helped develop the technique for seismic applications and provided the framework upon which modern theory is based.

A signal at a location A can be crosscorrelated with a signal at a location B to reproduce a virtual source-receiver pair using seismic interferometry. Crosscorrelation is often considered the key mathematical operation in this approach, but it is also possible to use convolution to come up with a similar result. The crosscorrelation of passive noise measured at a free surface reproduces the subsurface response as if it was induced by an impulsive point source, which is, by definition, equal to Green's function. As such, it is possible to obtain information about the subsurface with no need for an active seismic source. This method, however, is not limited to passive sources, and can be extended for use with active sources and computer–generated waveforms.

Image showing usefulness of seismic waves to investigate the subsurface

As of 2006 the field of seismic interferometry was beginning to change the way geophysicists view seismic noise. Seismic interferometry uses this previously–ignored background wavefield to provide new information that can be used to construct models of the subsurface as an inverse problem. Potential applications range from the continent scale to much smaller-scale natural hazards, industrial, and environmental applications.

== History and development ==
Claerbout (1968) developed a workflow to apply existing interferometry techniques to investigating the shallow subsurface, although it was not proven until later that seismic interferometry could be applied to real world media. The long term average of random ultrasound waves can reconstruct the impulse response between two points on an aluminum block. However, they had assumed random diffuse noise, limiting interferometry in real world conditions. In a similar case, it was shown that the expressions for uncorrelated noise sources reduce to a single crosscorrelation of observations at two receivers. The interferometric impulse response of the subsurface can be reconstructed using only an extended record of background noise, initially only for the surface and direct wave arrivals.

Crosscorrelations of seismic signals from both active and passive sources at the surface or in the subsurface can be used to reconstruct a valid model of the subsurface. Seismic interferometry can produce a result similar to traditional methods without limitations on the diffusivity of the wavefield or ambient sources. In a drilling application, it is possible to utilize a virtual source to image the subsurface adjacent to a downhole location. This application is increasingly utilized particularly for exploration in subsalt settings.

== Mathematical and Physical Explanation ==
Seismic interferometry provides for the possibility of reconstructing the subsurface reflection response using the crosscorrelations of two seismic traces. Recent work has mathematically demonstrated applications of crosscorrelation for reconstructing Green's function using wave field reciprocity theorem in a lossless, 3D heterogeneous medium. Traces are most often extended records of passive background noise, but it is also possible to utilize active sources depending on the objective. Seismic interferometry essentially exploits the phase difference between adjacent receiver locations to image the subsurface.

The conditions for the method to be valid, meaning to retrieve the Green's function from correlated signals, are given as follows:

- sources are uncorrelated in time,
- sources are located all around the receivers to reconstruct surface waves,
- the wavefield is equipartitioned, meaning it comprises both compressional and shear waves.

The last two conditions are hard to meet directly in nature. However, thanks to the wave scattering, the waves are converted, which satisfies the equipartition condition. The equal distribution of sources is met thanks to the fact, that the waves are scattered in every direction.

Seismic interferometry consists of simple crosscorrelation and stacking of actual receiver responses to approximate the impulse response as if a virtual source was placed at the location of the applicable receiver. Crosscorrelation of continuous functions in the time domain is presented as Equation 1.

=== Equation 1 ===
$(f_1 * f_2) (t) = \int f_1 (\lambda) f_2 (\lambda - t) d \lambda$

Where the functions are integrated as a function of time at different lag values. In fact, crosscorrelation can be understood conceptually as the traveltime lag associated with waveforms in two discrete receiver locations. Crosscorrelation is similar to convolution where the second function is folded relative to the first.

Seismic interferometry is fundamentally similar to the optical interferogram produced by the interference of a direct and reflected wave passing through a glass lens where intensity is primarily dependent upon the phase component.

Principle of convolution. Similar to cross-correlation

=== Equation 2 ===
$I = 1 +2R^{2} \cos [\omega ( \lambda_{Ar} + \lambda_{rB}) ] +R^{4}$

Where: Intensity ($I$) is related to the magnitude of the reflection coefficient ($R$) and the phase component $\omega ( \lambda_{Ar} + \lambda_{rB})$. An estimate of the reflectivity distributions can be obtained through the crosscorrelation of the direct wave at a location A with the reflection recorded at a location B where A represents the reference trace. The multiplication of the conjugate of the trace spectrum at A and the trace spectrum at B gives:

=== Equation 3 ===
$\Phi_{A,B} = -R \exp[i\omega (\lambda_{Ar} +\lambda_{rB})] + o.t.$

Where: $\Phi_{A,B} =$ product spectrum, $o.t. =$ additional terms, e.g. correlations of direct-direct or reflected-reflected waves. As in the previous case, the product spectrum is a function of phase.

Key: Changes in reflector geometry lead to changes in the correlation result and the reflector geometry can be recovered through the application of a migration kernel. Interpretation of raw interferograms is not normally attempted; crosscorrelated results are generally processed using some form of migration.

In the simplest case, consider a rotating drill bit at depth radiating energy that is recorded by geophones on the surface. It is possible to assume that the phase of the source wavelet at a given position is random and utilize the crosscorrelation of the direct wave at a location A with a ghost reflection at a location B to image a subsurface reflector without any knowledge regarding the source location. The crosscorrelation of traces A and B in the frequency domain simplifies as:

=== Equation 4 ===
$\Phi (A,B) = -|W_{i}(\omega)|^{2} R \exp [ i\omega (\lambda_{Ar} + \lambda_{rB} )] + o.t.$

Where: $W_{i}(\omega) =$ frequency domain source wavelet (ith wavelet)

The crosscorrelation of the direct wave at a location A with a ghost reflection at a location B removes the unknown source term where:

=== Equation 5 ===
$\Phi (A,B) \approx - R \exp [i \omega ( \lambda_{Ar} + \lambda_{rB} )]$

This form is equivalent to a virtual source configuration at a location A imaging hypothetical reflections at a location B. Migration of these correlation positions removes the phase term and yields a final migration image at position x where:

$m(x) = \sum_{A,B} \Phi(A,B,\lambda_{Ar} +\lambda_{rB})$

Where: $\Phi (A,B,t) =$ temporal correlation between locations $A$ and $B$ with lag time $t$.

This model has been applied to simulate subsurface geometry in West Texas using simulated models including a traditional buried source and a synthetic (virtual) rotating drill bit source to produce similar results. A similar model demonstrated the reconstruction of a simulated subsurface geometry. In this case, the reconstructed subsurface response correctly modeled the relative positions of primaries and multiples. Additional equations can be derived to reconstruct signal geometries in a wide variety of cases.

== Applications ==
Seismic interferometry is currently utilized primarily in research and academic settings. In one example, passive listening and the crosscorrelation of long noise traces was used to approximate the impulse response for shallow subsurface velocity analysis in Southern California. Seismic interferometry provided a result comparable to that indicated using elaborate inversion techniques. Seismic interferometry is most often used for the examination of the near surface and is often utilized to reconstruct surface and direct waves only. As such, seismic interferometry is commonly used to estimate ground roll to aid in its removal. Seismic interferometry simplifies estimates of shear wave velocity and attenuation in a standing building. Seismic interferometry has been applied to image the seismic scattering and velocity structure of volcanoes.

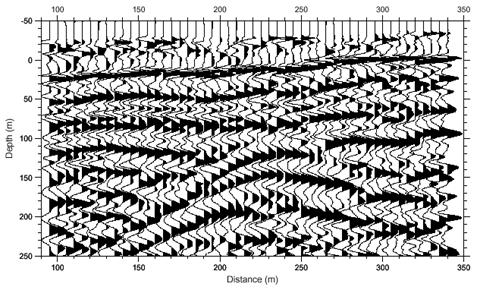
Seismic display as recorded by geophones

=== Exploration and production ===
Increasingly, seismic interferometry is finding a place in exploration and production. SI can image dipping sediments adjacent to salt domes. Complex salt geometries are poorly resolved using traditional seismic reflection techniques. An alternative method calls for the use of downhole sources and receivers adjacent to subsurface salt features. It is often difficult to generate an ideal seismic signal in a downhole location. Seismic interferometry can virtually move a source into a downhole location to better illuminate and capture steeply dipping sediments on the flank of a salt dome. In this case, the SI result was very similar to that obtained using an actual downhole source. Seismic interferometry can locate the position of an unknown source and is often utilized in hydrofrac applications to map the extent of induced fractures. It is possible that interferometric techniques can be applied to timelapse seismic monitoring of subtle changes in reservoir properties in the subsurface.

== Limitations ==
Seismic interferometry applications are currently limited by a number of factors. Real world media and noise represent limitations for current theoretical development. For example, for interferometry to work noise sources must be uncorrelated and completely surround the region of interest. In addition, attenuation and geometrical spreading are largely neglected and need to be incorporated into more robust models. Other challenges are inherent to seismic interferometry. For example, the source term only drops out in the case of the crosscorrelation of a direct wave at a location A with a ghost reflection at a location B. The correlation of other waveforms can introduce multiples to the resulting interferogram. Velocity analysis and filtering can reduce but not eliminate the occurrence of multiples in a given dataset.

Although there have been many advancements in seismic interferometry challenges still remain. One of the biggest remaining challenges is extending the theory to account for real world media and noise distributions in the subsurface. Natural sources typically do not comply with mathematical generalizations and may in fact display some degree of correlation. Additional problems must be addressed before applications of seismic interferometry can become more widespread.
