= Theodor Waitz =

German psychologist and anthropologist (1821–1864)

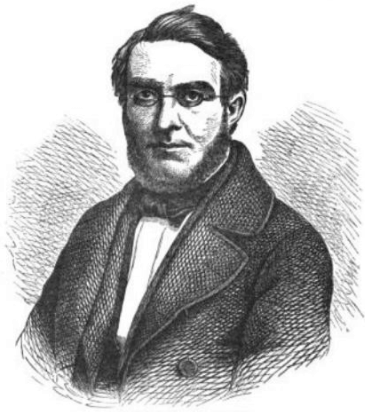
- Born: 17 March 1821; Gotha, Thuringia
- Died: 21 May 1864 (aged 43); Marburg, Hesse
- Education: Leipzig; University of Jena
- Occupations: Psychologist, anthropologist

Theodor Waitz (17 March 1821 – 21 May 1864) was a German psychologist and anthropologist. His research in psychology brought him into touch with anthropology, and he is best known for his monumental work in six volumes, Anthropologie der Naturvölker ("The anthropology of peoples that live close to nature").

== Biography ==
Waitz was born at Gotha and educated at the universities of Leipzig and Jena. He made philosophy, philology and mathematics his chief studies, and in 1848 he was appointed associate professor of philosophy at the University of Marburg (full professor, 1862). He was a severe critic of the philosophy of Fichte, Schelling and Hegel, and considered psychology to be the basis of all philosophy. He died in Marburg.

== Theorizing boredom ==
Theodor Waitz contributed significantly as an affective psychologist, particularly in the field of conceptualizing boredom. According to Waitz, boredom was about flow of thoughts. As one thought begets another, expectations on where this thought is moving towards are generated. Boredom arises when those expectations are not met. Boredom is basically associated with a break in the expected flow of thoughts because of a mismatch between expected and actual mental activity.

== Works ==
The first four volumes of his Anthropologie der Naturvölker appeared at Leipzig, 1859–64, the last two were issued posthumously, edited by Georg Gerland. Waitz also published:

- Grundlegung der Psychologie (1846).
- Lehrbuch der Psychologie als Naturwissenschaft (1849).
- Allgemeine Pedagogik (1852).
- Die Indianer Nordamerikas (1864).
- Aristotelis Organon graece; a critical edition of the Organon of Aristotle (1844).
