= Walter Zürn =

German physicist and seismologist

Walter Zürn (born August 21, 1937) is a German physicist and seismologist. His field of expertise includes the study of tides and seismic vibrations. In recognition of his outstanding contributions, the Zurn Peak (1515m) in Antarctica was named in his honor.

== Education ==
Zurn studied physics in Stuttgart, Germany and wrote his thesis at the "Institute of Metal Physics".

== Career ==
After graduation, he spent four years at the "University of California" (UCLA).

=== Antarctic research ===
From 1971 to 1972, Zurn was Science Manager at the Amundsen–Scott South Pole Station in Antarctica. He said of the station,

"This spot at the bottom of the world is a good observation post for numerous reasons including altitude, high magnetic latitude, remoteness from human interference and the ocean."

=== Research in Germany ===
Walter Zürn returned to Germany in 1974 and joined the newly established German Geophysical Society, where he worked at the Universities of Stuttgart and Karlsruhe. In the 1980s, he collaborated with Gerhard Müller on groundbreaking experiments testing Newton's law of universal gravitation. In recognition of his exceptional contributions to geophysics, Zürn was awarded the inaugural Rebeur-Paschwitz Prize by the German Geophysical Society in 2004.

== Honors ==
- Antarctic Medal of Merit of the United States (1976)
- Rebeur-Pashtun Prize of German Geophysical Society (2004)

== Publications ==
- Geoffrey King; Walter Zurn; Russ Evans; Dieter Emter (2007). "Site Correction for Long Period Seismometers, Tiltmeters and Strainmeters". Geophysical Journal International. 44 (2): 405–411. Bibcode:1976GeoJ...44..405K. doi:10.1111/j.1365-246X.1976.tb03664.x.
