= Infrasonic passive differential spectroscopy =

Technique for mapping oil and gas deposits

Infrasonic passive seismic spectroscopy (IPSS) is a passive seismic low frequency technique used for mapping potential oil and gas hydrocarbon accumulations.

It is part of the geophysical techniques also known under the generic naming passive seismic which includes also passive seismic tomography and micro seismic monitoring for petroleum, gas, and geothermal applications. In a larger scale, passive seismic includes the Global Seismic Network (GSN) earthquake monitoring.

Regarding petroleum and geothermal exploration (within a small scale), the effect of fluid distribution on P-wave propagation in partially saturated rocks is responsible for the low frequency reservoir-related wavefield absorption.

The high level of attenuation within the infrasonic bandwidth (below 10 Hz) of the seismic field observed in natural oil-saturated porous media during the last years (explained by mesoscopic homogeneous models) is the main responsible of the passive seismic wave field shifting within a low frequency range.

Pressure differences between regions with different fluid/solid properties induce frequency-dependency of the attenuation (Qp and Qs reservoir factors) and velocity dispersion (Vp, Vs) of the low frequency wave field.

Infrasonic passive seismic spectroscopy quantifies the absorption and the wave field dispersion within the low frequency bandwidth giving the most predominant areas linked with possible oil-saturated and porous media.

The low frequency seismic field is not usually reachable by the active seismic surveys being either the explosive waves mainly in the high frequency and the vibroseis currently built not to reach such a low frequencies.
