= Long-period ground motion =

Long-period ground motion (LPGM) refers to seismic waves that occur during a seismic event, like an earthquake or nuclear explosion, that has a frequency typically defined as less than 1 Hertz (i.e. a period of more than 1 second). These long-period waves are particularly significant in the context of tall or long structures, like bridges and high-rise buildings, as their nature causes short-period waves to dampen significantly before reaching the points more distant from the seismic event (e.g. from the ground). Furthermore, a frequency of around 1 Hz or less is also a frequency often found to resonate with these buildings. Although there is no official lower limit to the wave-frequency in LPGM, in terms of earthquakes, it is usually limited in scope between a 1 and 10 second period.

The significance of resonance in buildings can be seen in buildings like the Millennium Bridge, which had to be temporarily closed due to people walking in resonance with their stepping frequency being around 1 Hz.

== Classification by Japan Meteorological Agency ==
The Japan Meteorological Agency (JMA) classifies long-period seismic intensity under 4 classes. These classes are particularly relevant for estimating the effects of LPGM on high-rise buildings. The higher the class the more difficult it is to perform regular activity and the greater the expected damage is to buildings.

In order to classify the intensity, the JMA looks at the maximum value of the absolute velocity response spectrum (Sva) with a damping constant of 5% over a period range from 1.6 to 7.8 seconds with calculation increments of 0.2 second. This then converts to the following classes:

JMA long-period seismic intensity classes
LPGM Class	Absolute Velocity Response Spectrum Sva	Perception	Effect
Class 1	5 cm/s ≤ Sva < 15 cm/s	Felt by most.	Hanging objects move significantly.
Class 2	15 cm/s ≤ Sva < 50 cm/s	Strong shaking felt; difficult to move by foot without support.	Furniture with casters moves slightly. Objects may fall from shelves.
Class 3	50 cm/s ≤ Sva < 100 cm/s	It is difficult to remain standing.	Furniture on casters moves significantly. Cracks may form in walls.
Class 4	100 cm/s ≤ Sva	It is impossible to remain standing.	Most unsecured furniture shifts significantly or falls over. Cracks in walls are common.

== See also ==
- Love wave
- S-wave
- P-wave
- Rayleigh wave
- Transverse wave
- Seismic microzonation
- Slow earthquake
- Strong ground motion
