= RadExPro seismic software =

Seismic processing software system

RadExPro is a Windows-based seismic processing software system produced by RadExPro Seismic Software LLC based in Georgia. It is suitable for in-field QC (both online and offline) and processing of 3D and 2D marine and on-land seismic data, advanced processing of HR/UHR offshore seismic, as well as for the onshore near-surface seismic reflection, refraction, MASW, and VSP processing.

For marine applications where data was collected within a broad range of parameters and equipment (single or multi-channel, boomer, sparker or airgun, 2D or 3D), high resolution marine data benefits greatly from in-depth processing in RadExPro, revealing more details from data and extracting more geologic information for presentation.
