= Earthquake environmental effects =

Earthquake effects are the effects caused by an earthquake, including surface faulting, tsunamis, soil liquefactions, ground resonance, landslides and ground failure, either directly linked to the earthquake source or provoked by the ground shaking. These are common features produced both in the near and far fields, routinely recorded and surveyed in recent events, very often remembered in historical accounts and preserved in the stratigraphic record (paleo earthquakes). Both surface deformation and faulting and shaking-related geological effects (e.g., soil liquefaction, landslides) not only leave permanent imprints in the environment, but also dramatically affect human structures. Moreover, underwater fault ruptures and seismically triggered landslides can generate tsunami waves destroying beaches in most cases.

EEE represent a significant source of hazard, especially (but not exclusively) during large earthquakes. This was observed for example during more or less catastrophic seismic events recently occurred in very different parts of the world.

Earthquake environmental effects are divided into two main types:

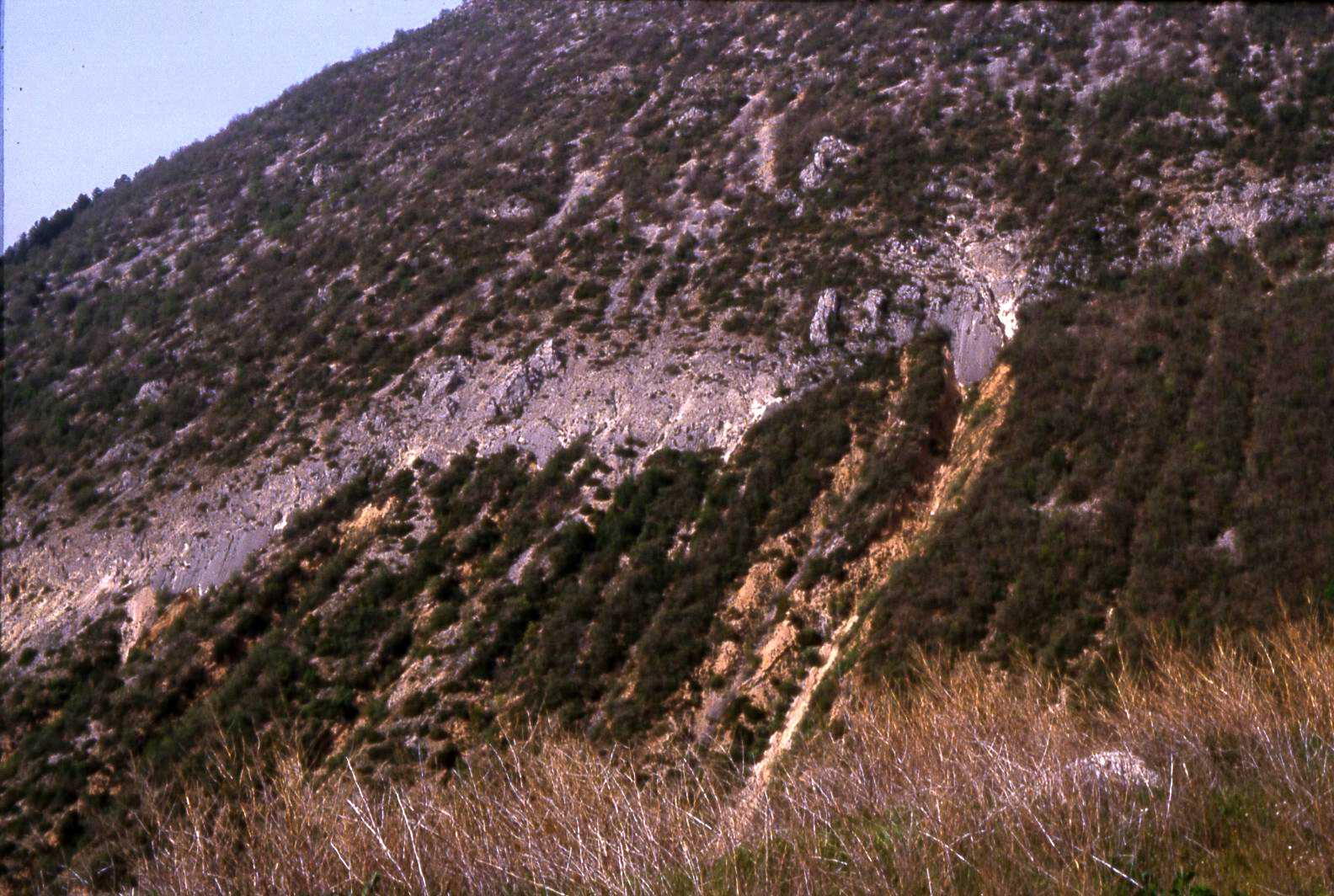
Coseismic surface faulting induced by the 1915 Fucino, Central Italy, earthquake

- Primary effects: which are the surface expression of the seismogenic source (e.g., surface faulting), normally observed for crustal earthquakes above a given magnitude threshold (typically M_{w}=5.5–6.0);

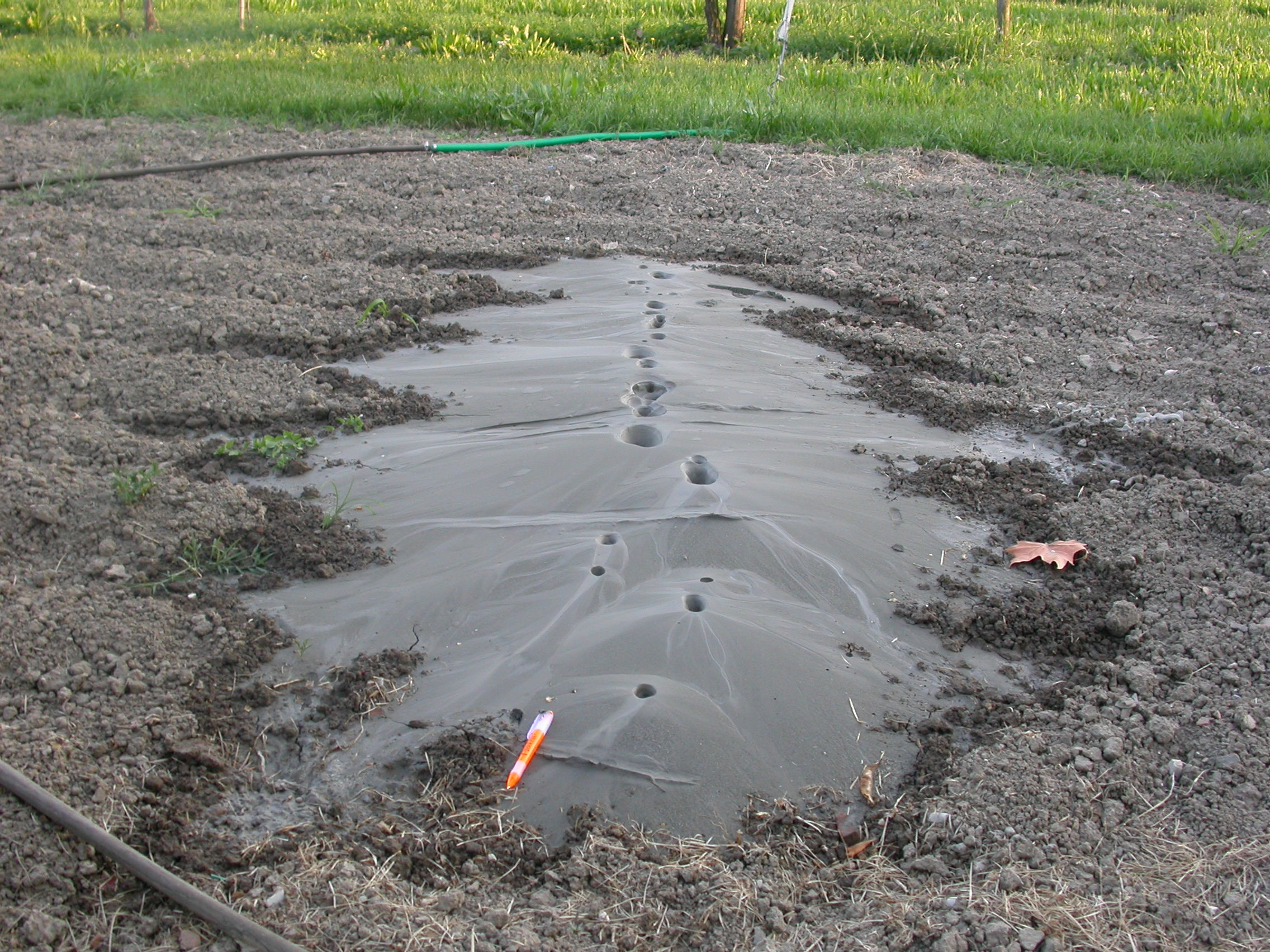
Coseismic liquefaction induced by one of the 2012 Emilia, Northern Italy, earthquakes

- Secondary effects: mostly this is the intensity of the ground shaking (e.g., landslides, liquefaction, etc.).

The importance of a tool to measure earthquake Intensity was already outlined early in the 1990s. In 2007 the Environmental Seismic Intensity scale (ESI scale) was released, a new seismic intensity scale based only on the characteristics, size and areal distribution of earthquake environmental effects.

A huge amount of data about associated with modern, historical and paleoearthquakes worldwide, an infrastructure developed in the framework of the INQUA TERPRO Commission on Paleoseismology and Active Tectonics.

== See also ==
- Earthquake light
- Electromagnetic field
- Richter scale
