= Microtremor =

Microtremor is a low amplitude (in the order of micrometres) ambient vibration of the ground caused by man-made or atmospheric disturbances. The term Ambient Vibrations is now preferred to talk about this phenomenon. Observation of microtremors can give useful information on dynamic properties of the site such as predominant period and amplitude. Microtremor observations are easy to perform, inexpensive and can be applied to places with low seismicity as well, hence, microtremor measurements can be used conveniently for seismic microzonation. More detailed information on the shear wave velocity profile of the site can be obtained from microtremor array observation.

== History ==
After the pioneering work by Kannai and Tanaka, many researchers have investigated the applicability and reliability of the microtremor method. The major drawback of the method proposed by Kannai and Tanaka was that they considered the Fourier spectra of observed horizontal motions to reflect the transfer function of the surface. It has now been established that the horizontal microtremor spectra often show the characteristics of the source rather than the transfer function of a site.

Yukta Nakamura in 1989, modified microtremor analysis by proposing a new technique, generally referred to as the H/V method. In this technique, it was shown that the source effect can be minimized by normalizing the horizontal spectral amplitude with the vertical spectral amplitude. Assuming that the shear wave dominates the microtremor, Nakamura indicated that the horizontal-to-vertical (H/V) spectral ratio of microtremors at a site roughly equals the S wave transfer function between the ground surface and bedrock at a site. This means that the H/V peak period and peak value itself correspond to the natural site period and amplification factor respectively. This method does not require any boreholes and is, hence, more convenient and inexpensive compared to the traditional borehole method. This method is now widely used for microtremor observation although it lacks a clear theoretical background. Lermo and Chavez-Garcia showed the applicability of Nakamura's method of microtremor in site effect prediction. However, it was found true only for the fundamental resonance peak of the transfer function. The results supported the idea that Nakamura's technique effectively compensated for the site effects.

Another technique which known as refraction microtremor is also widely used in earth sciences today.
