= Environmental Seismic Intensity scale =

Earthquake intensity scale

The Environmental Seismic Intensity scale (ESI 2007) is a seismic scale used for measuring the intensity of an earthquake on the basis of the effects of the earthquake on the natural environment (Earthquake Environmental Effects).

== Overview ==
The international effort to develop a new scale of macroseismic intensity that would focus exclusively on environmental effects of earthquakes began in the early 1990s and was sponsored by the International Union for Quaternary Research (INQUA). After the final draft of the scale was approved by INQUA at its XVII Congress in Cairns, Australia, in 2007, the scale became officially known as ESI 2007.

Like many other intensity scales, ESI 2007 uses the basic structure of twelve degrees of seismic intensity and is designed for application during field surveys immediately after the seismic event. However, the definitions of intensity degrees in ESI 2007 are based on the observation of distribution and size of environmental effects produced by an earthquake. This approach makes ESI 2007 a unique diagnostic tool for the assessment of seismic intensity levels X to XII in sparsely populated and uninhibited areas where earthquake effects on people and built environment may not be easily observed. For intensity level IX or lower, the ESI 2007 scale is intended to be used as a supplement to other intensity scales.

a) the Definition of intensity degrees on the basis of Earthquake Environmental Effects;

b) the Guidelines, which aim at better clarifying i) the background of the scale and the scientific concepts that support the introduction of such a new macroseismic scale; ii) the procedure to use the scale alone or integrated with damage-based, traditional scales; iii) how the scale is organized; iv) the descriptions of diagnostic features required for intensity assessment, and the meaning of idioms, colors, and fonts.

Since 2007, the scale has been applied to modern, historical and paleoearthquakes in the frame of the INQUA TERPRO Commission on Paleoseismology and Active tectonics. It is now available in ten different languages.

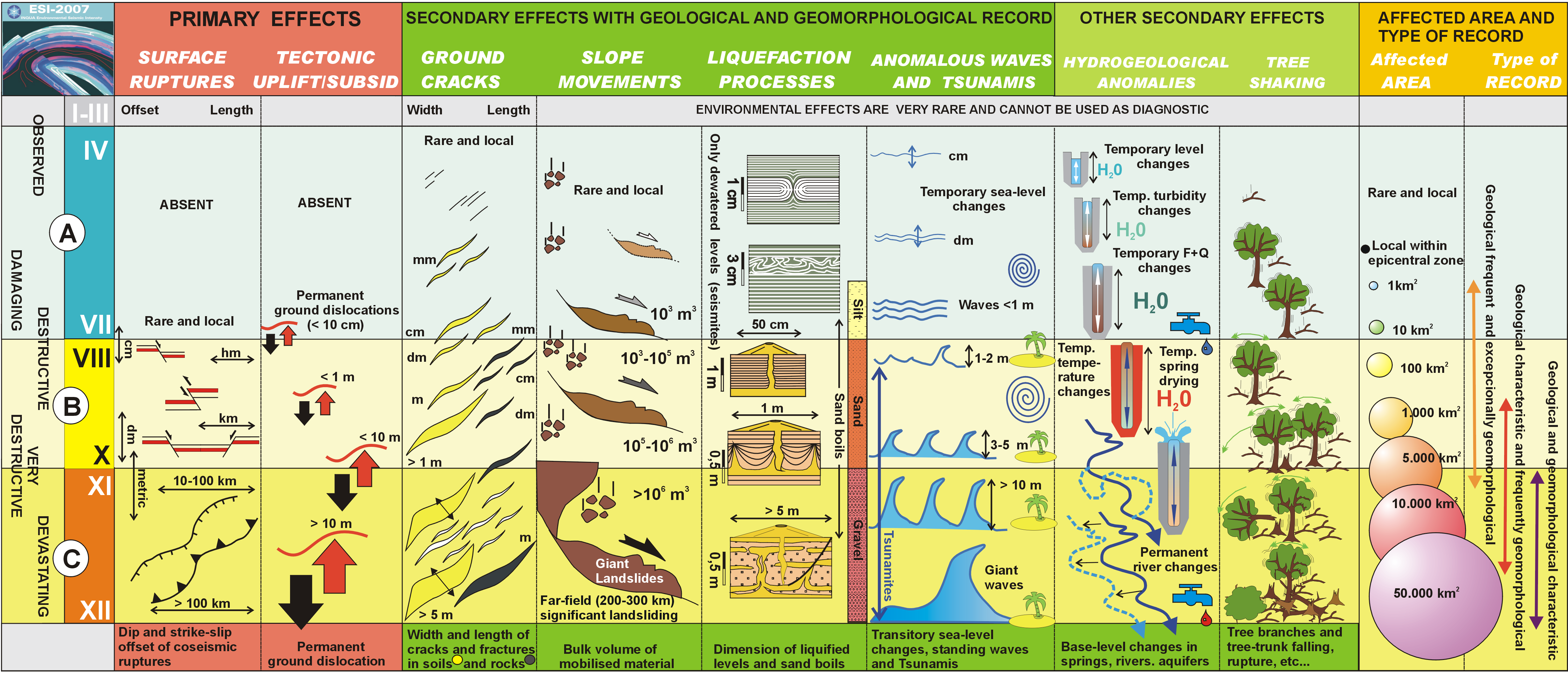
Graphic representation of the ESI 2007 intensity degrees

== See also ==
- Other seismic scales

== Sources ==
- Serva, Leonello; Vittori, Eutizio; Comerci, Valerio; Esposito, Eliana; Guerrieri, Luca; Michetti, Alessandro Maria; Mohammadioun, Bagher; Mohammadioun, Georgianna C.; Porfido, Sabina; Tatevossian, Ruben E. (2016). "Earthquake Hazard and the Environmental Seismic Intensity (ESI) Scale". Pure and Applied Geophysics. 173 (5): 1479–1515. Bibcode:2016PApGe.173.1479S. doi:10.1007/s00024-015-1177-8. S2CID 129721390.
- Porfido S., Esposito E., Spiga E., Mazzola S. (2012). Application of the ESI Scale: Case study of the Febr. 4, 1976 Guatemala earthquake. INQUA-IGCP .Proc. Morelia (Mexico), 2012, Vol 3, 147–150
- Porfido, S., Esposito, E., Violante, C., Molisso, F., Sacchi M., Spiga E. (2011) Earthquakes-Induced Environmental Effects in Coastal Area: Some Example in Calabria and Sicily (Southern Italy). In: Brugnoli E., Cavarretta G., Mazzola S., Trincardi F., Ravaioli M., Santoleri R (eds), Marine Research at Cnr, ISSN 2239-5172 Volume DTA/06, CNR, 1803–1815
- Nappi, R.; Gaudiosi, G.; Alessio, G.; De Lucia, M.; Porfido, S. (2017). "The environmental effects of the 1743 Salento earthquake (Apulia, southern Italy): A contribution to seismic hazard assessment of the Salento Peninsula". Natural Hazards. 86: 295–324. doi:10.1007/s11069-016-2548-x.
- Audemard F., Azuma T., Baiocco F., Baize S., Blumetti A.M., Brustia E., Clague J., Comerci V., Esposito E., Guerrieri L., Gurpinar A., Grutzner C., Jin K., Kim Y.S., Kopsachilis V., Lucarini M., Mc CalpinJ., Michetti A.M., Mohammadioun B., Morner N.A., Okumura K., Ota Y., Papathanassiou G., Pavlides S., Perez Lopez R., Porfido S., Reicherter K., Rodriguez Pascua M.A., Roghozin E., Scaramella A., Serva L., Silva P.G., Sintubin M., Tatevossian R. & Vittori E.(2015) Earthquake Environmental Effect for seismic hazard assessment: the ESI intensity scale and the EEE Catalogue. Mem. Desc. Carta Geol d’Italia,184 pp., vol. XCVII.
- Porfido S., Esposito E., Guerrieri L., Vittori E., Tranfaglia G., Pece R., 2007. Seismically induced ground effects of the 1805, 1930 and 1980 earthquakes in the Southern Apennines (Italy). Ital .J. Geosci., 126, 2, 333–346.
- Serva L., E. Esposito, L. Guerrieri, S. Porfido, E. Vittori, V. Comerci (2007) Environmental effects from five historical earthquakes in southern Apennines (Italy) and macroseismic intensity assessment: contribution to INQUA EEE Scale Project. Quaternary International, 173–174, 2007, 30–44
- Porfido, Sabina; Alessio, Giuliana; Gaudiosi, Germana; Nappi, Rosa. 2020. "New Perspectives in the Definition/Evaluation of Seismic Hazard through Analysis of the Environmental Effects Induced by Earthquakes" Geosciences 10, no. 2: 58. https://doi.org/10.3390/geosciences10020058
- Nappi, R.; Porfido, S.; Paganini, E.; Vezzoli, L.; Ferrario, M.F.; Gaudiosi, G.; Alessio, G.; Michetti, A.M. The 2017, MD = 4.0, Casamicciola Earthquake: ESI-07 Scale Evaluation and Implications for the Source Model. Geosciences 2021, 11, 44. https://doi.org/10.3390/geosciences11020044
- Caccavale, M.; Sacchi, M.; Spiga, E.; Porfido, S. The 1976 Guatemala Earthquake: ESI Scale and Probabilistic/Deterministic Seismic Hazard Analysis Approaches. Geosciences 2019, 9, 403. https://doi.org/10.3390/geosciences9090403
- Chunga, K.; Livio, F.A.; Martillo, C.; Lara-Saavedra, H.; Ferrario, M.F.; Zevallos, I.; Michetti, A.M. Landslides Triggered by the 2016 Mw 7.8 Pedernales, Ecuador Earthquake: Correlations with ESI-07 Intensity, Lithology, Slope and PGA-h. Geosciences 2019, 9, 371. https://doi.org/10.3390/geosciences9090371
