= Refraction microtremor =

Refraction microtremor (ReMi) is a surface-performed geophysical survey developed by Dr. John Louie (and others) based on previously existing principles of evaluating surface waves and in particular Rayleigh waves. The refraction microtremor technology was developed at the University of Nevada and is owned by the State of Nevada. Optim of Reno, Nevada has the exclusive license to develop the technology, and SeisOpt® ReMi™ has been available commercially from Optim since 2004. Since Rayleigh waves are dispersive, the propagating waves are measured along a linear seismic array and evaluated relative to wave frequency and slowness (or the inverse of the velocity). Due to the dispersive characteristics of higher frequency waves travelling through the more shallow conditions and lower frequency waves passing through deeper materials, a 1-D subsurface profile can be generated based on the velocity with depth.

== Equipment and Field Procedures ==
The method utilizes equipment typically employed in seismic refraction surveys. This equipment consists of a seismograph, geophones placed in an array, and a seismic source. An array consists of 6 to 48+ geophones placed at some interval along the ground surface to measure the propagating waves and are connected to a seismograph that records the data. Rayleigh waves are generated from seismic sources described to be active, passive, or a combination of both. For example, active sources can be generated sources from a sledge hammer striking a plate or other sources that are created near the traverse. Passive sources can be nearby highway traffic, construction equipment working in the distance, etc. Several recordings (typically 15 to 60+ seconds long) are captured and stored for later analysis. As multiple traverses are performed along the ground surface, the 1-D profiles can be compiled to generate a 2-D profile of the subsurface conditions. It is worth noting that since seismic traverses typically "average" conditions along the traverse length to some extent, the expectations and limitations of geophysical methods should be realized.
