= Passive seismic =

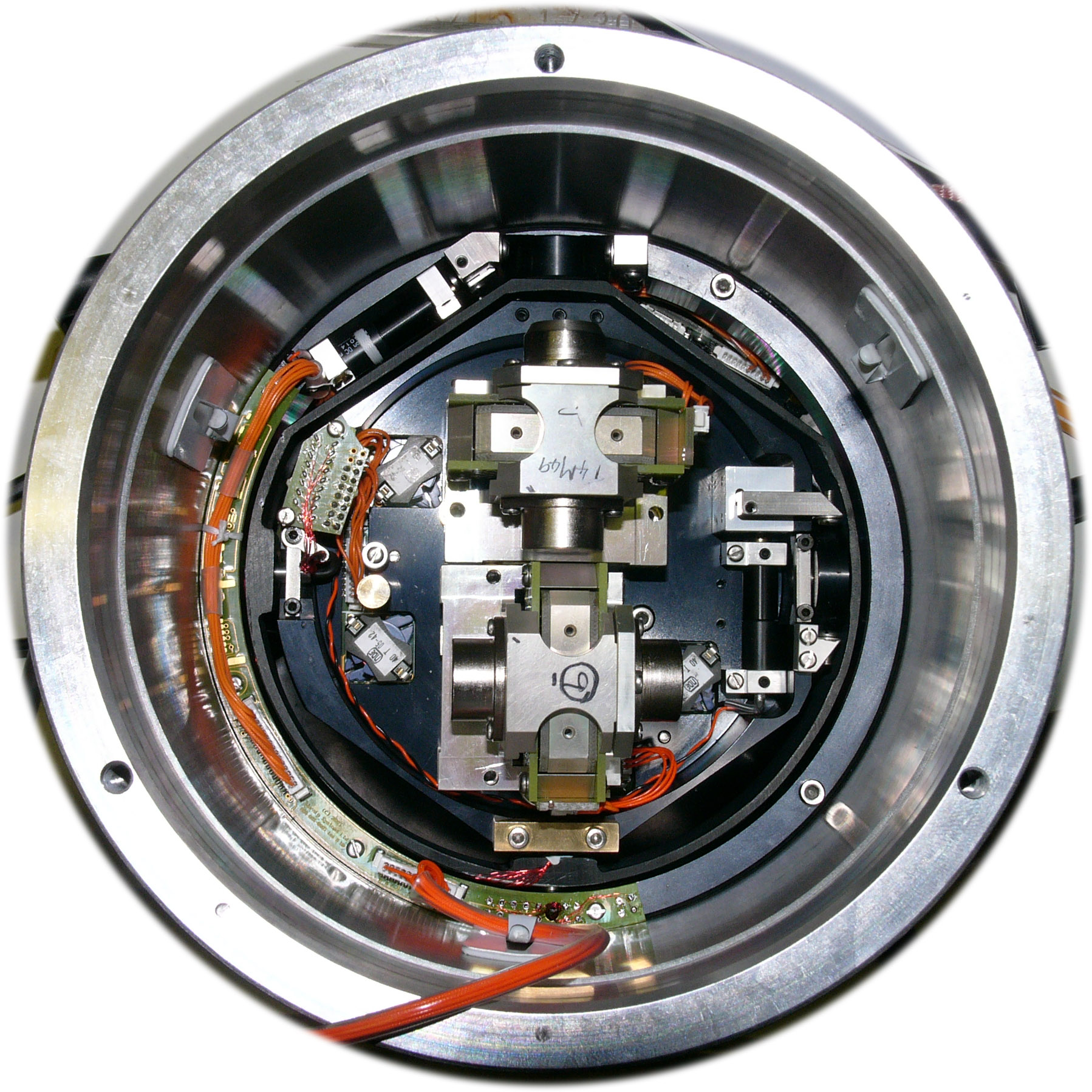
The low frequency 3-direction seismometer, suitable for the passive seismic (cover removed)

Passive seismic is the detection of natural low frequency earth movements, usually with the purpose of discerning geological structure and locate underground oil, gas, or other resources. Usually the data listening is done in multiple measurement points that are separated by several hundred meters, over periods of several hours to several days, using portable seismometers. The conclusions about the geological structure are based on the spectral analysis or on the mathematical reconstruction of the propagation and possible sources of the observed seismic waves. If the latter is planned, data are usually acquired in multiple (in the ideal case – all) points simultaneously, using so called synchronized lines. Reliability of the time reverse modelling can be further increased using results of reflection seismology about the distribution of the sound speed in the underground volume.

Passive seismic usually focuses on a low frequency signals (0 to 10 Hz) and is sometimes called the "low frequency" seismology. The seismometers record movements in all 3 possible directions independently (such devices also have other application areas like long-term measurement stations). When needed, data acquisition is also done under water, using waterproof devices that measure earth movements at the bottom of the sea. Geophones are almost never used due to their limited sensitivity.

The survey using this method is very different from the conventional survey that is usually based on reflection seismology. The conventional survey consists of numerous measurements that are spatially very close together and relatively short (often lasting in the order of minutes). The passive seismic survey has much less measurements but they are frequently recorded for days. Local time must be taken into consideration, picking intervals with less human induced noise. Even relatively distant earthquakes are visible in the recorded spectrograms and must also be excluded from analysis.

The similar method have been also applied in another planets. For instance, during Apollo missions, the Passive Seismic Experiment sensors were deployed that detected lunar "moonquakes" and provided information about the internal structure of the Moon.

Passive seismic is much less expensive than well drilling. It is also cheaper and more environmentally friendly than active seismic, which requires a strong source of the seismic waves (like an underground explosion) to predict the structure. In some cases it may be the only method for which land access is granted by the land owner. Despite the method having been successfully applied in many parts of the world, this approach is currently less reliable, as the scientific methods are still largely under development.

== See also ==
- Reflection seismology
