= Ground motion =

Movement of the Earth's surface

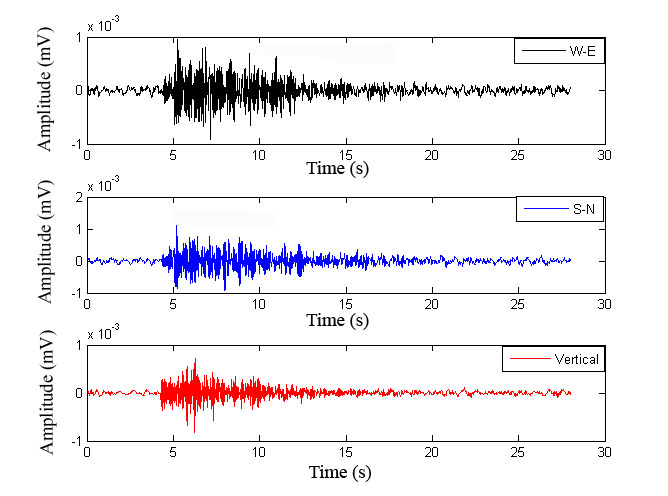
Sisma three components

Ground motion is the movement of the Earth’s surface from earthquakes or explosions. Ground motion is produced by seismic waves that are generated by sudden slip on a fault or sudden pressure at the explosive source and travel through the Earth and along its surface. This can be due to natural events, such as earthquakes and volcanic eruptions, or human activities, such as the detonation of nuclear weapons. There are two main types of seismic waves: body waves and surface waves. Body waves travel through the interior of the Earth, while surface waves travel along the Earth's surface. Ground motion is typically caused by surface waves, which are the most destructive type of seismic waves.

Ground motion is measured using a seismometer, a device that detects and records the movement of the Earth's surface. Seismometers are used by seismologists to study earthquakes and other types of ground motion. The recordings produced by a seismometer are known as seismograms, and they can be used to study the characteristics of the ground motion, such as its duration, amplitude, and frequency.

Ground motion is typically measured in three components: west-to-east, south-to-north, and vertical. Recordings from multiple seismometers can be combined to form a detailed model of the ground motion. This is known as a seismograph, and it can be used to study the spatial and temporal characteristics of the ground motion. Seismographs can also be used to create maps of the ground motion, which can help scientists understand the distribution and intensity of the seismic waves.

== See also ==
- Long period ground motion
- Strong ground motion
