= Seismic magnitude scales =

Scales to describe earthquake strength

Seismic magnitude scales are used to describe the overall strength or "size" of an earthquake. These are distinguished from seismic intensity scales that categorize the intensity or severity of ground shaking (quaking) caused by an earthquake at a given location. Magnitudes are usually determined from measurements of an earthquake's seismic waves as recorded on a seismogram. Magnitude scales vary based on what aspect of the seismic waves are measured and how they are measured. Different magnitude scales are necessary because of differences in earthquakes, the information available, and the purposes for which the magnitudes are used.

== Earthquake magnitude and ground-shaking intensity ==
Isoseismal map for the 1968 Illinois earthquake. The irregular distribution of shaking arises from variations of geology and ground conditions.

The Earth's crust is stressed by tectonic forces. When this stress becomes great enough to rupture the crust, or to overcome the friction that prevents one block of crust from slipping past another, energy is released, some of it in the form of various kinds of seismic waves that cause ground-shaking, or quaking.

Magnitude is an estimate of the relative "size" or strength of an earthquake, and thus its potential for causing ground-shaking. It is "approximately related to the released seismic energy".

Intensity refers to the strength or force of shaking at a given location, and can be related to the peak ground velocity. With an isoseismal map of the observed intensities (see illustration) an earthquake's magnitude can be estimated from both the maximum intensity observed (usually but not always near the epicenter), and from the extent of the area where the earthquake was felt.

The intensity of local ground-shaking depends on several factors besides the magnitude of the earthquake, one of the most important being soil conditions. For instance, thick layers of soft soil (such as fill) can amplify seismic waves, often at a considerable distance from the source, while sedimentary basins will often resonate, increasing the duration of shaking. This is why, in the 1989 Loma Prieta earthquake, the Marina district of San Francisco was one of the most damaged areas, though it was nearly 100 km from the epicenter. Geological structures were also significant, such as where seismic waves passing under the south end of San Francisco Bay reflected off the base of the Earth's crust towards San Francisco and Oakland. A similar effect channeled seismic waves between the other major faults in the area.

== Magnitude scales ==
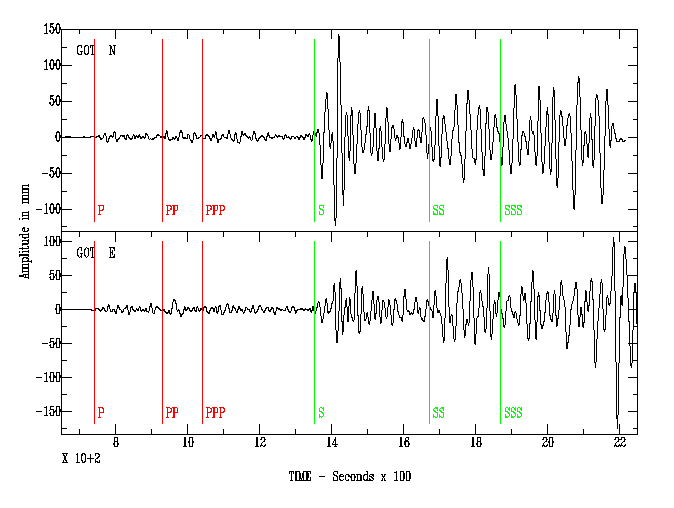
Typical seismogram. The compressive P waves (following the red lines) – essentially sound passing through rock – are the fastest seismic waves, and arrive first, typically in about 10 seconds for an earthquake around 50 km away. The sideways-shaking S waves (following the green lines) arrive some seconds later, traveling a little over half the speed of the P waves; the delay is a direct indication of the distance to the quake. S waves may take an hour to reach a point 1000 km away. Both of these are body-waves, that pass directly through the earth's crust. Following the S waves are various kinds of surface-waves – Love waves and Rayleigh waves – that travel only at the earth's surface. Surface waves are smaller for deep earthquakes, which have less interaction with the surface. For shallow earthquakes – less than roughly 60 km deep – the surface waves are stronger, and may last several minutes; these carry most of the energy of the quake, and cause the most severe damage.

An earthquake radiates energy in the form of different kinds of seismic waves, whose characteristics reflect the nature of both the rupture and the earth's crust the waves travel through. Determination of an earthquake's magnitude generally involves identifying specific kinds of these waves on a seismogram, and then measuring one or more characteristics of a wave, such as its timing, orientation, amplitude, frequency, or duration. Additional adjustments are made for distance, kind of crust, and the characteristics of the seismograph that recorded the seismogram.

The various magnitude scales represent different ways of deriving magnitude from such information as is available. All magnitude scales retain the logarithmic scale as devised by Charles Richter, and are adjusted so the mid-range approximately correlates with the original "Richter" scale.

Most magnitude scales are based on measurements of only part of an earthquake's seismic wave-train, and therefore are incomplete. This results in systematic underestimation of magnitude in certain cases, a condition called saturation.

Since 2005 the International Association of Seismology and Physics of the Earth's Interior (IASPEI) has standardized the measurement procedures and equations for the principal magnitude scales, M_{L}, M_{s}, mb, mBand mb_{Lg}.

=== "Richter" magnitude scale ===
The first scale for measuring earthquake magnitudes, developed in 1935 by Charles F. Richter and popularly known as the "Richter" scale, is actually the local magnitude scale, label ML or M_{L}. Richter established two features common to all magnitude scales.

1. First, the scale is logarithmic, so that each unit represents a tenfold increase in the amplitude of the seismic waves. As the energy of a wave is proportional to A^{1.5}, where A denotes the amplitude, each unit of magnitude represents a 10^{1.5} ≈ 32-fold increase in the seismic energy (strength) of an earthquake.
2. Second, Richter arbitrarily defined the zero point of the scale to be where an earthquake at a distance of 100 km makes a maximum horizontal displacement of 0.001 mm (1 μm, or 0.00004 in.) on a seismogram recorded with a Wood-Anderson torsion seismograph. Subsequent magnitude scales are calibrated to be approximately in accord with the original "Richter" (local) scale around magnitude 6.

All "Local" (ML) magnitudes are based on the maximum amplitude of the ground shaking, without distinguishing the different seismic waves. They underestimate the strength:

- of distant earthquakes (over ~600 km) because of attenuation of the S waves,
- of deep earthquakes because the surface waves are smaller, and
- of strong earthquakes (over M ~7) because they do not take into account the duration of shaking.

The original "Richter" scale, developed in the geological context of Southern California and Nevada, was later found to be inaccurate for earthquakes in the central and eastern parts of the North American continent (everywhere east of the Rocky Mountains) because of differences in the continental crust. All these problems prompted the development of other scales.

Most seismological authorities, such as the United States Geological Survey, report earthquake magnitudes above 4.0 as moment magnitude M_{w}, which the press describes as "Richter magnitude".

=== Other "local" magnitude scales ===
Richter's original "local" scale has been adapted for other localities. These may be labelled "ML", or with a lowercase "l", either Ml, or M_{l}. (Not to be confused with the Russian surface-wave MLH scale.) Whether the values are comparable depends on whether the local conditions have been adequately determined and the formula suitably adjusted.

==== Japan Meteorological Agency magnitude scale ====
In Japan, for shallow (depth < 60 km) earthquakes within 600 km, the Japanese Meteorological Agency calculates a magnitude labeled MJMA, M_{JMA}, or M_{J}. (These should not be confused with moment magnitudes JMA calculates, which are labeled M_{w}(JMA) or M^{(JMA)}, nor with the Shindo intensity scale.) JMA magnitudes are based (as typical with local scales) on the maximum amplitude of the ground motion; they agree "rather well" with the seismic moment magnitude M_{w} in the range of 4.5 to 7.5, but underestimate larger magnitudes.

=== Body-wave magnitude scales ===
Body-waves consist of P waves that are the first to arrive (see seismogram), or S waves, or reflections of either. Body-waves travel through rock directly.

==== mB scale ====
The original "body-wave magnitude" – mB or m_{B} (uppercase "B") – was developed by Gutenberg 1945c and Gutenberg & Richter 1956 to overcome the distance and magnitude limitations of the M_{L} scale inherent in the use of surface waves. mB is based on the P and S waves, measured over a longer period, and does not saturate until around M 8. However, it is not sensitive to events smaller than about M = 5.5. Use of mB as originally defined has been largely abandoned, replaced by the standardized mB_{BB} scale.

==== mb scale ====
The mb or m_{b} scale (lowercase "m" and "b") is similar to mB, but uses only P waves measured in the first few seconds on a specific model of short-period seismograph. It was introduced in the 1960s with the establishment of the World-Wide Standardized Seismograph Network (WWSSN); the short period improves detection of smaller events, and better discriminates between tectonic earthquakes and underground nuclear explosions.

Measurement of mb has changed several times. As originally defined by Gutenberg (1945c) m_{b} was based on the maximum amplitude of waves in the first 10 seconds or more. However, the length of the period influences the magnitude obtained. Early USGS/NEIC practice was to measure mbon the first second (just the first few P waves), but since 1978 they measure the first twenty seconds. The modern practice is to measure short-period mbscale at less than three seconds, while the broadband mB_{BB} scale is measured at periods of up to 30 seconds.

==== mb_{Lg} scale ====
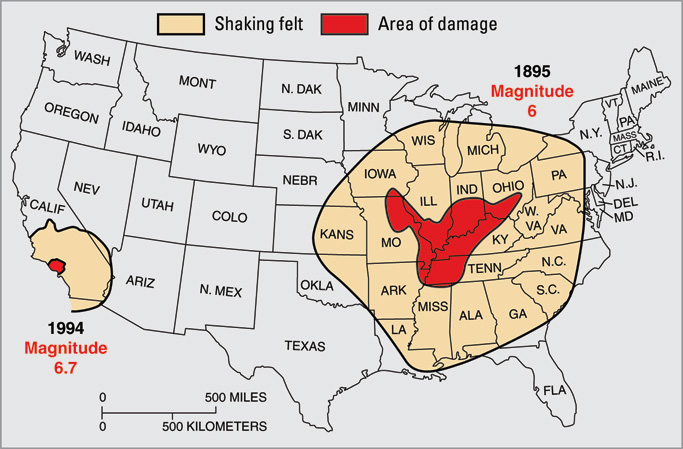
Differences in the crust underlying North America east of the Rocky Mountains makes that area more sensitive to earthquakes. Shown here: the 1895 New Madrid earthquake, M ~6, was felt through most of the central U.S., while the 1994 Northridge quake, though almost ten times stronger at M 6.7, was felt only in southern California. From USGS Fact Sheet 017–03.

The regional mb_{Lg} scale – also denoted mb_Lg, mbLg, MLg (USGS), Mn, and m_{N} – was developed by Nuttli (1973) for a problem the original M_{L} scale could not handle: all of North America east of the Rocky Mountains. The M_{L} scale was developed in southern California, which lies on blocks of oceanic crust, typically basalt or sedimentary rock, which have been accreted to the continent. East of the Rockies the continent is a craton, a thick and largely stable mass of continental crust that is largely granite, a harder rock with different seismic characteristics. In this area the M_{L} scale gives anomalous results for earthquakes that by other measures seemed equivalent to quakes in California.

Nuttli resolved this by measuring the amplitude of short-period (~ 1 second) Lg waves, a complex form of the Love wave that, although a surface wave, he found provided a result more closely related to the mbscale than the M_{s}scale. Lg waves attenuate quickly along any oceanic path, but propagate well through the granitic continental crust, and Mb_{Lg} is often used in areas of stable continental crust; it is especially useful for detecting underground nuclear explosions.

=== Surface-wave magnitude scales ===
Surface waves propagate along the Earth's surface, and are principally either Rayleigh waves or Love waves. For shallow earthquakes the surface waves carry most of the energy of the earthquake, and are the most destructive. Deeper earthquakes, having less interaction with the surface, produce weaker surface waves.

The surface-wave magnitude scale, variously denoted as Ms, M_{S}, and M_{s}, is based on a procedure developed by Beno Gutenberg in 1942 for measuring shallow earthquakes stronger or more distant than Richter's original scale could handle. Notably, it measured the amplitude of surface waves (which generally produce the largest amplitudes) for a period of "about 20 seconds". The M_{s}scale approximately agrees with M_{L}at ~6, then diverges by as much as half a magnitude. A revision by Nuttli (1983), sometimes labeled M_{Sn}, measures only waves of the first second.

A modification – the "Moscow-Prague formula" – was proposed in 1962, and recommended by the IASPEI in 1967; this is the basis of the standardized M_{s20} scale (Ms_20, M_{s}(20)). A "broad-band" variant (Ms_BB, M_{s}(BB)) measures the largest velocity amplitude in the Rayleigh-wave train for periods up to 60 seconds. The M_{S7} scale used in China is a variant of M_{s} calibrated for use with the Chinese-made "type 763" long-period seismograph.

The MLH scale used in some parts of Russia is actually a surface-wave magnitude.

=== Moment magnitude and energy magnitude scales ===
Other magnitude scales are based on aspects of seismic waves that only indirectly and incompletely reflect the force of an earthquake, involve other factors, and are generally limited in some respect of magnitude, focal depth, or distance. The moment magnitude scale – Mw or M_{w} – developed by seismologists Thomas C. Hanks and Hiroo Kanamori, is based on an earthquake's seismic moment, M_{0}, a measure of how much work an earthquake does in sliding one patch of rock past another patch of rock. Seismic moment is measured in newton-meters (N m or N⋅m) in the SI, or dyne-centimeters (dyn⋅cm; 1 dyn⋅cm = 10^{−7} N⋅m) in the older CGS system. In the simplest case the moment can be calculated knowing only the amount of slip, the area of the surface ruptured or slipped, and a factor for the resistance or friction encountered. These factors can be estimated for an existing fault to determine the magnitude of past earthquakes, or what might be anticipated for the future.

An earthquake's seismic moment can be estimated in various ways, which are the bases of the M_{wb}, M_{wr}, M_{wc}, M_{ww}, M_{wp}, M_{i}, and M_{wpd} scales, all subtypes of the generic M_{w} scale. See Moment magnitude scale § Subtypes for details.

Seismic moment is considered the most objective measure of an earthquake's "size" in regard of total energy. However, it is based on a simple model of rupture, and on certain simplifying assumptions; it does not account for the fact that the proportion of energy radiated as seismic waves varies among earthquakes.

Much of an earthquake's total energy as measured by M_{w} is dissipated as friction (resulting in heating of the crust). An earthquake's potential to cause strong ground shaking depends on the comparatively small fraction of energy radiated as seismic waves, and is better measured on the energy magnitude scale, M_{e}. The proportion of total energy radiated as seismic waves varies greatly depending on focal mechanism and tectonic environment; M_{e} and M_{w} for very similar earthquakes can differ by as much as 1.4 units.

Despite the usefulness of the M_{e} scale, it is not generally used due to difficulties in estimating the radiated seismic energy.

Two earthquakes differing greatly in the damage done

In 1997 there were two large earthquakes off the coast of Chile. The magnitude of the first, in July, was estimated at M_{w} 6.9, but was barely felt, and only in three places. In October an M_{w} 7.1 quake in nearly the same location, but twice as deep and on a different kind of fault, was felt over a broad area, injured over 300 people, and destroyed or seriously damaged over 10,000 houses. As can be seen in the table, this disparity of damage done is not reflected in either the moment magnitude (M_{w}) nor the surface-wave magnitude (M_{s}). Only when the magnitude is measured on the basis of the body-wave (mb) or the seismic energy (M_{e}) is there a difference comparable to the difference in damage.

Date	ISC #	Lat.	Long.	Depth	Damage	M_{s}	M_{w}	mb	M_{e}	Type of fault
6 July 1997	1035633	−30.06	−71.87	23 km	Barely felt	6.5	6.9	5.8	6.1	interplate-thrust
15 Oct. 1997	1047434	−30.93	−71.22	58 km	Extensive	6.8	7.1	6.8	7.5	intraslab-normal
Difference:						0.3	0.2	1.0	1.4	

Rearranged and adapted from Table 1 in Choy, Boatwright & Kirby 2001, p. 13. Seen also in IS 3.6 2012, p. 7.

=== Energy class (K-class) scale ===
K (from the Russian word класс, 'class', in the sense of a category) is a measure of earthquake magnitude in the energy class or K-class system, developed in 1955 by Soviet seismologists in the remote Garm (Tajikistan) region of Central Asia; in revised form it is still used for local and regional quakes in many states formerly aligned with the Soviet Union (including Cuba). Based on seismic energy (K = log E_{S}, in Joules), difficulty in implementing it using the technology of the time led to revisions in 1958 and 1960. Adaptation to local conditions has led to various regional K scales, such as K_{F} and K_{S}.

K values are logarithmic, similar to Richter-style magnitudes, but have a different scaling and zero point. K values in the range of 12 to 15 correspond approximately to M 4.5 to 6. M(K), M_{(K)}, or possibly M_{K} indicates a magnitude M calculated from an energy class K.

=== Tsunami magnitude scales ===
Earthquakes that generate tsunamis generally rupture relatively slowly, delivering more energy at longer periods (lower frequencies) than generally used for measuring magnitudes. Any skew in the spectral distribution can result in larger, or smaller, tsunamis than expected for a nominal magnitude. The tsunami magnitude scale, M_{t}, is based on a correlation by Katsuyuki Abe of earthquake seismic moment (M_{0}) with the amplitude of tsunami waves as measured by tidal gauges. Originally intended for estimating the magnitude of historic earthquakes where seismic data is lacking but tidal data exist, the correlation can be reversed to predict tidal height from earthquake magnitude. (Not to be confused with the height of a tidal wave, or run-up, which is an intensity effect controlled by local topography.) Under low-noise conditions, tsunami waves as little as 5 cm can be predicted, corresponding to an earthquake of M ~6.5.

Another scale of particular importance for tsunami warnings is the mantle magnitude scale, M_{m}. This is based on Rayleigh waves that penetrate into the Earth's mantle, and can be determined quickly, and without complete knowledge of other parameters such as the earthquake's depth.

=== Duration and coda magnitude scales ===
M_{d} designates various scales that estimate magnitude from the duration or length of some part of the seismic wave-train. This is especially useful for measuring local or regional earthquakes, both powerful earthquakes that might drive the seismometer off-scale (a problem with the analog instruments formerly used) and preventing measurement of the maximum wave amplitude, and weak earthquakes, whose maximum amplitude is not accurately measured. Even for distant earthquakes, measuring the duration of the shaking (as well as the amplitude) provides a better measure of the earthquake's total energy. Measurement of duration is incorporated in some modern scales, such as M_{wpd} and mB_{c}.

M_{c} scales usually measure the duration or amplitude of a part of the seismic wave, the coda. For short distances (less than ~100 km) these can provide a quick estimate of magnitude before the quake's exact location is known.

=== Macroseismic magnitude scales ===
Magnitude scales generally are based on instrumental measurement of some aspect of the seismic wave as recorded on a seismogram. Where such records do not exist, magnitudes can be estimated from reports of the macroseismic events such as described by intensity scales.

One approach for doing this (developed by Beno Gutenberg and Charles Richter in 1942) relates the maximum intensity observed (presumably this is over the epicenter), denoted I_{0} (capital I with a subscripted zero), to the magnitude. It has been recommended that magnitudes calculated on this basis be labeled M_{w}(I_{0}), but are sometimes labeled with a more generic M_{ms}.

Another approach is to make an isoseismal map showing the area over which a given level of intensity was felt. The size of the "felt area" can also be related to the magnitude (based on the work of Frankel 1994 and Johnston 1996). While the recommended label for magnitudes derived in this way is M_{0}(An), the more commonly seen label is M_{fa}. A variant, M_{La}, adapted to California and Hawaii, derives the local magnitude (M_{L}) from the size of the area affected by a given intensity. M_{I} (upper-case letter "I", distinguished from the lower-case letter in M_{i}) has been used for moment magnitudes estimated from isoseismal intensities calculated per Johnston 1996.

Peak ground velocity (PGV) and peak ground acceleration (PGA) are measures of the force that causes destructive ground shaking. In Japan, a network of strong-motion accelerometers provides PGA data that permits site-specific correlation with different magnitude earthquakes. This correlation can be inverted to estimate the ground shaking at that site due to an earthquake of a given magnitude at a given distance. From this a map showing areas of likely damage can be prepared within minutes of an actual earthquake.

=== Other magnitude scales ===
Many earthquake magnitude scales have been developed or proposed, with some never gaining broad acceptance and remaining only as obscure references in historical catalogs of earthquakes. Other scales have been used without a definite name, often referred to as "the method of Smith (1965)" (or similar language), with the authors often revising their method. On top of this, seismological networks vary on how they measure seismograms. Where the details of how a magnitude has been determined are unknown, catalogs will specify the scale as "unknown" (variously Unk, Ukn, or UK). In such cases, the magnitude is considered generic and approximate.

An M_{h} ("magnitude determined by hand") label has been used where the magnitude is too small or the data too poor (typically from analog equipment) to determine a Local magnitude, or multiple shocks or cultural noise complicates the records. The Southern California Seismic Network uses this "magnitude" where the data fail the quality criteria.

A special case is the Seismicity of the Earth catalog of Gutenberg & Richter (1954). Hailed as a milestone as a comprehensive global catalog of earthquakes with uniformly calculated magnitudes, they never published the full details of how they determined those magnitudes. Consequently, while some catalogs identify these magnitudes as M_{GR}, others use UK (meaning "computational method unknown"). Subsequent study found many of the M_{s}values to be "considerably overestimated". Further study has found that most of the M_{GR}magnitudes "are basically M_{s}for large shocks shallower than 40 km, but are basically mBfor large shocks at depths of 40–60 km". Gutenberg and Richter also used an italic, non-bold M without subscript – also used as a generic magnitude, and not to be confused with the bold, non-italic M used for moment magnitude – and a "unified magnitude" m (bolding added). While these terms (with various adjustments) were used in scientific articles into the 1970s, they have become of only historical interest. An ordinary (non-italic, non-bold) capital "M" without subscript is often used to refer to magnitude generically, where an exact value or the specific scale used is not important.

== See also ==
- Magnitude of completeness
- Epicentral distance

== General and cited sources ==
- Abe, K. (April 1979), "Size of great earthquakes of 1837–1874 inferred from tsunami data", Journal of Geophysical Research, 84 (B4): 1561–1568, Bibcode:1979JGR....84.1561A, doi:10.1029/JB084iB04p01561.
- Abe, K. (October 1981), "Magnitudes of large shallow earthquakes from 1904 to 1980", Physics of the Earth and Planetary Interiors, 27 (1): 72–92, Bibcode:1981PEPI...27...72A, doi:10.1016/0031-9201(81)90088-1.
- Abe, K. (September 1989), "Quantification of tsunamigenic earthquakes by the M_{t} scale", Tectonophysics, 166 (1–3): 27–34, Bibcode:1989Tectp.166...27A, doi:10.1016/0040-1951(89)90202-3.
- Abe, K; Noguchi, S. (August 1983), "Revision of magnitudes of large shallow earthquakes, 1897-1912", Physics of the Earth and Planetary Interiors, 33 (1): 1–11, Bibcode:1983PEPI...33....1A, doi:10.1016/0031-9201(83)90002-X.
- Anderson, J. G. (2003), "Chapter 57: Strong-Motion Seismology", International Handbook of Earthquake & Engineering Seismology, Part B, pp. 937–966, ISBN 0-12-440658-0.
- Bindi, D.; Parolai, S.; Oth, K.; Abdrakhmatov, A.; Muraliev, A.; Zschau, J. (October 2011), "Intensity prediction equations for Central Asia", Geophysical Journal International, 187: 327–337, Bibcode:2011GeoJI.187..327B, doi:10.1111/j.1365-246X.2011.05142.x.
- Blackford, M. E. (1984), "Use of the Abe magnitude scale by the Tsunami Warning System." (PDF), Science of Tsunami Hazards, 2 (1): 27–30, archived (PDF) from the original on 2026-07-16
- Bolt, B. A. (1993), Earthquakes and geological discovery, Scientific American Library, ISBN 0-7167-5040-6.
- Bormann, P., ed. (2012), New Manual of Seismological Observatory Practice 2 (NMSOP-2), Potsdam: IASPEI/GFZ German Research Centre for Geosciences, doi:10.2312/GFZ.NMSOP-2.
- Bormann, P. (2012), "Data Sheet 3.1: Magnitude calibration formulas and tables, comments on their use and complementary data.", in Bormann (ed.), New Manual of Seismological Observatory Practice 2 (NMSOP-2), doi:10.2312/GFZ.NMSOP-2_DS_3.1, archived from the original on 2019-08-04.
- Bormann, P. (2012), "Exercise 3.1: Magnitude determinations", in Bormann (ed.), New Manual of Seismological Observatory Practice 2 (NMSOP-2), doi:10.2312/GFZ.NMSOP-2_EX_3, archived from the original on 2019-08-04.
- Bormann, P. (2013), "Information Sheet 3.2: Proposal for unique magnitude and amplitude nomenclature", in Bormann (ed.), New Manual of Seismological Observatory Practice 2 (NMSOP-2), doi:10.2312/GFZ.NMSOP-2_IS_3.3, archived from the original on 2019-08-04.
- Bormann, P.; Dewey, J. W. (2014), "Information Sheet 3.3: The new IASPEI standards for determining magnitudes from digital data and their relation to classical magnitudes.", in Bormann (ed.), New Manual of Seismological Observatory Practice 2 (NMSOP-2), doi:10.2312/GFZ.NMSOP-2_IS_3.3, archived from the original on 2019-08-04.
- Bormann, P.; Fugita, K.; MacKey, K. G.; Gusev, A. (July 2012), "Information Sheet 3.7: The Russian K-class system, its relationships to magnitudes and its potential for future development and application", in Bormann (ed.), New Manual of Seismological Observatory Practice 2 (NMSOP-2), doi:10.2312/GFZ.NMSOP-2_IS_3.7, archived from the original on 2019-08-04.
- Bormann, P.; Liu, R.; Ren, X.; Gutdeutsch, R.; Kaiser, D.; Castellaro, S. (2007), "Chinese national network magnitudes, their relation to NEIC magnitudes, and recommendations for new IASPEI magnitude standards", Bull. Seism. Soc. Am., vol. 97, pp. 114–127.
- Bormann, P.; Saul, J. (2009), "Earthquake Magnitude" (PDF), Encyclopedia of Complexity and Applied Systems Science, vol. 3, pp. 2473–2496.
- Bormann, P.; Wendt, S.; Di Giacomo, D. (2013), "Chapter 3: Seismic Sources and Source Parameters", in Bormann (ed.), New Manual of Seismological Observatory Practice 2 (NMSOP-2), doi:10.2312/GFZ.NMSOP-2_ch3, archived from the original on 2019-08-04.
- Chen, T. C.; Pomeroy, P. W. (1980), Regional Seismic Wave Propagation (PDF), archived from the original (PDF) on 2 February 2025
- Choy, G. L.; Boatwright, J. L. (2012), "Information Sheet 3.6: Radiated seismic energy and energy magnitude", in Bormann (ed.), New Manual of Seismological Observatory Practice 2 (NMSOP-2), doi:10.2312/GFZ.NMSOP-2_IS_3.6, archived from the original on 2019-08-04.
- Choy, G. L.; Boatwright, J. L.; Kirby, S. (2001), The Radiated Seismic Energy and Apparent Stress of Interplate and Intraslab Earthquakes at Subduction Zone Environments: Implications for Seismic Hazard Estimation (PDF), vol. Open-File Report 01-0005, United States Geological Survey, archived (PDF) from the original on 2025-06-18
- Chung, D. H.; Bernreuter, D. L. (1980), Regional Relationships Among Earthquake Magnitude Scales., OSTI 5073993, NUREG/CR-1457.
- Doi, K. (2010), "Operational Procedures of Contributing Agencies" (PDF), Bulletin of the International Seismological Centre, 47 (7–12): 25, ISSN 2309-236X, archived from the original (PDF) on 2022-01-20. Also available here Archived 2023-01-02 at the Wayback Machine (sections renumbered).
- Engdahl, E. R.; Villaseñor, A. (2002), "Chapter 41: Global Seismicity: 1900–1999", in Lee, W.H.K.; Kanamori, H.; Jennings, P.C.; Kisslinger, C. (eds.), International Handbook of Earthquake and Engineering Seismology (PDF), vol. Part A, Academic Press, pp. 665–690, ISBN 0-12-440652-1, archived (PDF) from the original on 2017-08-20.
- Frankel, A. (1994), "Implications of felt area-magnitude relations for earthquake scaling and the average frequency of perceptible ground motion", Bulletin of the Seismological Society of America, 84 (2): 462–465.
- Grünthal, G. (2011), "Earthquakes, Intensity", in Gupta, H. (ed.), Encyclopedia of Solid Earth Geophysics, pp. 237–242, ISBN 978-90-481-8701-0.
- Gutenberg, B. (January 1945a), "Amplitudes of surface Waves and magnitudes of shallow earthquakes" (PDF), Bulletin of the Seismological Society of America, 35 (1): 3–12, archived (PDF) from the original on 2018-11-04.
- Gutenberg, B. (1 April 1945c), "Magnitude determination for deep-focus earthquakes" (PDF), Bulletin of the Seismological Society of America, 35 (3): 117–130, archived (PDF) from the original on 28 August 2017
- Gutenberg, B.; Richter, C. F. (1936), "On seismic waves (third paper)", Gerlands Beiträge zur Geophysik, 47: 73–131.
- Gutenberg, B.; Richter, C. F. (1942), "Earthquake magnitude, intensity, energy, and acceleration", Bulletin of the Seismological Society of America: 163–191, ISSN 0037-1106.
- Gutenberg, B.; Richter, C. F. (1954), Seismicity of the Earth and Associated Phenomena (2nd ed.), Princeton University Press, 310p.
- Gutenberg, B.; Richter, C. F. (1956), "Magnitude and energy of earthquakes" (PDF), Annali di Geofisica, 9: 1–15, archived (PDF) from the original on 2019-11-18
- Havskov, J.; Ottemöller, L. (October 2009). "Processing Earthquake Data" (PDF). FTP server (FTP). (To view documents see Help:FTP).
- Hough, S.E. (2007), Richter's scale: measure of an earthquake, measure of a man, Princeton University Press, ISBN 978-0-691-12807-8.
- Hutton, L. K.; Boore, David M. (December 1987), "The M_{L} scale in Southern California" (PDF), Nature, 271: 411–414, Bibcode:1978Natur.271..411K, doi:10.1038/271411a0, archived from the original (PDF) on 2025-09-11.
- Hutton, Kate; Woessner, Jochen; Haukson, Egill (April 2010), "Earthquake Monitoring in Southern California for Seventy-Seven Years (1932—2008)" (PDF), Bulletin of the Seismological Society of America, 100 (1): 423–446, doi:10.1785/0120090130, archived (PDF) from the original on 2020-03-13
- Johnston, A. (1996), "Seismic moment assessment of earthquakes in stable continental regions – II. Historical seismicity", Geophysical Journal International, 125 (3): 639–678, Bibcode:1996GeoJI.125..639J, doi:10.1111/j.1365-246x.1996.tb06015.x.
- Kanamori, H. (July 10, 1977), "The energy release in great earthquakes" (PDF), Journal of Geophysical Research, 82 (20): 2981–2987, Bibcode:1977JGR....82.2981K, doi:10.1029/JB082i020p02981, archived from the original (PDF) on September 20, 2016.
- Kanamori, H. (April 1983), "Magnitude Scale and Quantification of Earthquake" (PDF), Tectonophysics, 93 (3–4): 185–199, Bibcode:1983Tectp..93..185K, doi:10.1016/0040-1951(83)90273-1.
- Katsumata, A. (June 1996), "Comparison of magnitudes estimated by the Japan Meteorological Agency with moment magnitudes for intermediate and deep earthquakes.", Bulletin of the Seismological Society of America, 86 (3): 832–842.
- Makris, N.; Black, C. J. (September 2004), "Evaluation of Peak Ground Velocity as a "Good" Intensity Measure for Near-Source Ground Motions", Journal of Engineering Mechanics, 130 (9): 1032–1044, doi:10.1061/(asce)0733-9399(2004)130:9(1032).
- Musson, R. M.; Cecić, I. (2012), "Chapter 12: Intensity and Intensity Scales", in Bormann (ed.), New Manual of Seismological Observatory Practice 2 (NMSOP-2), doi:10.2312/GFZ.NMSOP-2_ch12, archived from the original on 2019-08-04.
- Nuttli, O. W. (10 February 1973), "Seismic wave attenuation and magnitude relations for eastern North America", Journal of Geophysical Research, 78 (5): 876–885, Bibcode:1973JGR....78..876N, doi:10.1029/JB078i005p00876.
- Nuttli, O. W. (April 1983), "Average seismic source-parameter relations for mid-plate earthquakes", Bulletin of the Seismological Society of America, 73 (2): 519–535.
- Rautian, T. G.; Khalturin, V. I.; Fujita, K.; Mackey, K. G.; Kendall, A. D. (November–December 2007), "Origins and Methodology of the Russian Energy K-Class System and Its Relationship to Magnitude Scales" (PDF), Seismological Research Letters, 78 (6): 579–590, doi:10.1785/gssrl.78.6.579, archived (PDF) from the original on 2017-08-09.
- Rautian, T.; Leith, W. S. (September 2002), "Developing Composite Regional Catalogs of the Seismicity of the Former Soviet Union." ( (PDF)), 24th Seismic Research Review – Nuclear Explosion Monitoring: Innovation and Integration, Ponte Vedra Beach, Florida: Laboratory for Atmospheric Acoustics, archived from the original on 2020-09-22.
- Richter, C. F. (January 1935), "An Instrumental Earthquake Magnitude Scale" (PDF), Bulletin of the Seismological Society of America, 25 (1): 1–32, archived from the original (PDF) on 2018-07-10.
- Spence, W.; Sipkin, S. A.; Choy, G. L. (1989), "Measuring the size of an Earthquake" (PDF), Earthquakes and Volcanoes, 21 (1): 58–63, archived (PDF) from the original on 2017-02-18.
- Stover, C. W.; Coffman, J. L. (1993), Seismicity of the United States, 1568–1989 (Revised) (PDF), U.S. Geological Survey Professional Paper 1527, archived (PDF) from the original on 2025-05-16.
