= Wood–Anderson seismometer =

Instrument for measuring strength of earthquakes

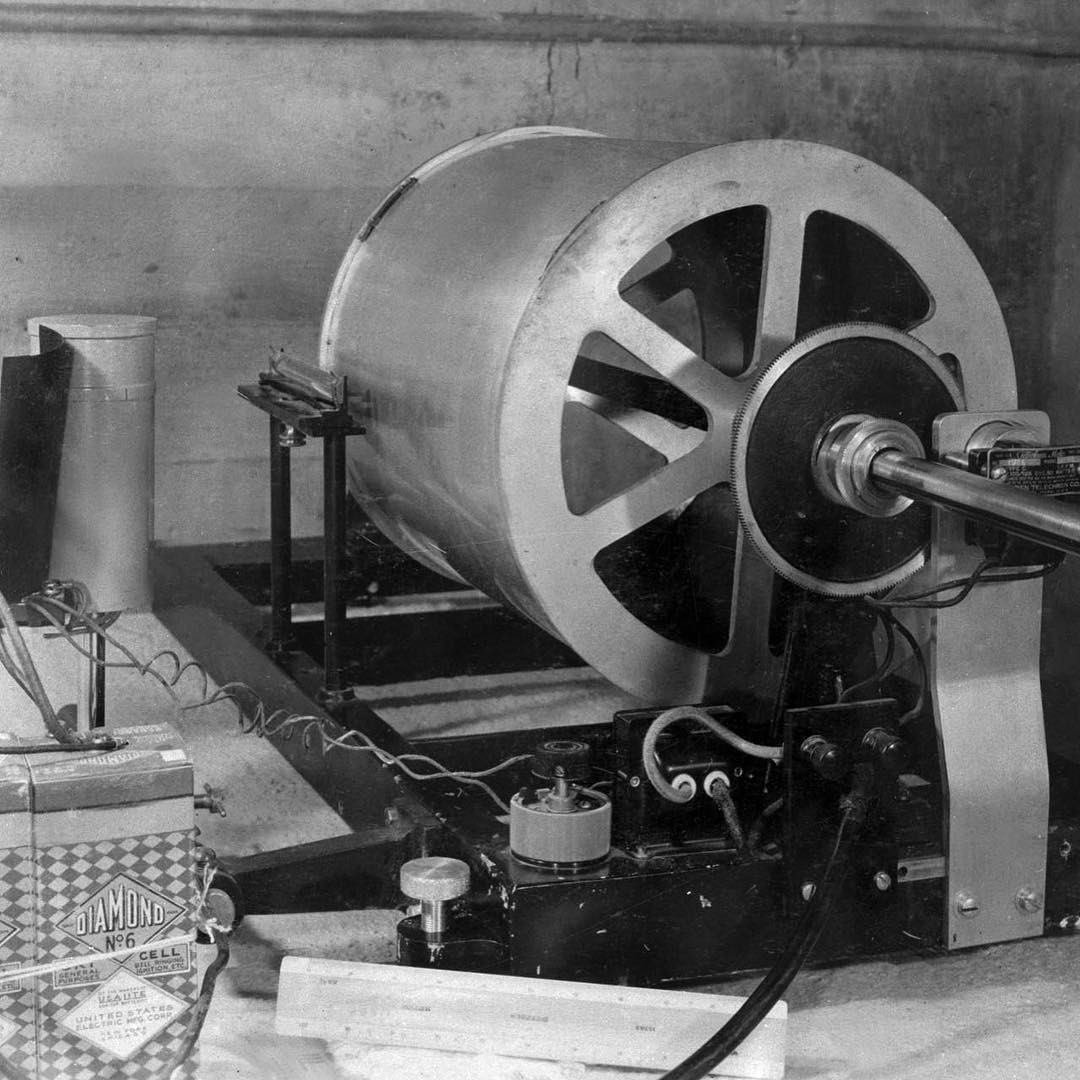
Wood-Anderson seismograph recorder, with synchronous AC motor that drives its drum at a constant speed of 1 mm per second

The Wood–Anderson seismometer (also known as the Wood–Anderson seismograph) is a torsion seismometer developed in the United States by Harry O. Wood and John August Anderson in the 1920s to record local earthquakes in southern California. It photographically records the horizontal motion. The seismometer uses a pendulum of 0.8g, its period is 0.8 seconds, its magnification is 2,800 times, and its damping constant is 0.8. Charles Francis Richter developed the Richter magnitude scale using the Wood–Anderson seismometer.

== Overview ==
In 1908, geologist Grove K. Gilbert paid Harry Wood $1,000 to draft a map of potentially active faults in northern California and several years later Andrew Lawson, professor at the University of California, Berkeley assigned Wood to oversee the University's seismometers, where attention was focused on local earthquakes as well as the distant events that were used (especially by European scientists like Beno Gutenberg) to study the attributes of the Earth's interior. Seismometers that were in use up until that time had been developed and optimized for detecting the long-period seismic waves from distant earthquakes and did not detect local events well. Wood left Berkeley in 1912 and spent several years researching volcano seismology in Hawaii and made contact with Arthur L. Day, the director of the Carnegie Institution's geophysical laboratory, while Day also conducted volcanological research there. He would serve as Wood's mentor who took his advice and went to work at the Bureau of Standards in Washington D. C. where a relationship was developed with George Ellery Hale, the director of Carnegie's Mount Wilson Observatory in Pasadena.

In March 1921, the Carnegie Institution accepted a proposal from Wood to provide financing for a long-duration program of seismological research in Southern California. As a researcher for the Institute, Wood worked in a partnership with John A. Anderson (an instrument designer and astrophysicist from the Mount Wilson Observatory) to pursue the development of a seismometer that could record the short-period waves from local earthquakes. Their instrument would require the ability to measure the seismic waves with periods from .5–2.0 seconds, which were considerably shorter than what the existing units were able to detect. In September 1923, with the successful completion of what became known as the Wood-Anderson torsion seismometer, the focus became establishing a network of the instruments throughout the region that would be able to pinpoint earthquake epicenters and eventually allow mapping of the corresponding fault zones. Wood suggested that the Carnegie Institute establish a small network of the units at five locations throughout the region (Pasadena, Mount Wilson, Riverside, Santa Catalina Island, and Fallbrook) and the Institute agreed to move forward with the proposal.

== Richter magnitude scale ==
Prior to the development of the magnitude scale, the only measure of an earthquake's strength or "size" was a subjective assessment of the intensity of shaking observed near the epicenter of the earthquake, categorized by various seismic intensity scales such as the Rossi-Forel scale. ("Size" is used in the sense of the quantity of energy released, not the size of the area affected by shaking, though higher-energy earthquakes do tend to affect a wider area, depending on the local geology.) In 1883 John Milne surmised that the shaking of large earthquakes might generate waves detectable around the globe, and in 1899 E. Von Rehbur Paschvitz observed in Germany seismic waves attributable to an earthquake in Tokyo. In the 1920s Harry Wood and John Anderson developed the Wood–Anderson Seismograph, one of the first practical instruments for recording seismic waves. Wood then built, under the auspices of the California Institute of Technology and the Carnegie Institute, a network of seismographs stretching across Southern California. He also recruited the young and unknown Charles Richter to measure the seismograms and locate the earthquakes generating the seismic waves.

In 1931 Kiyoo Wadati showed how he had measured, for several strong earthquakes in Japan, the amplitude of the shaking observed at various distances from the epicenter. He then plotted the logarithm of the amplitude against the distance and found a series of curves that showed a rough correlation with the estimated magnitudes of the earthquakes. Richter resolved some difficulties with this method and then, using data collected by his colleague Beno Gutenberg, he produced similar curves, confirming that they could be used to compare the relative magnitudes of different earthquakes.

To produce a practical method of assigning an absolute measure of magnitude required additional developments. First, to span the wide range of possible values, Richter adopted Gutenberg's suggestion of a logarithmic scale, where each step represents a tenfold increase of magnitude, similar to the magnitude scale used by astronomers for star brightness. Second, he wanted a magnitude of zero to be around the limit of human perceptibility. Third, he specified the Wood–Anderson seismograph as the standard instrument for producing seismograms. Magnitude was then defined as "the logarithm of the maximum trace amplitude, expressed in microns", measured at a distance of 100 km (62 mi). The scale was calibrated by defining a magnitude 0 shock as one that produces (at a distance of 100 km (62 mi)) a maximum amplitude of 1 micron (1 μm, or 0.001 millimeters) on a seismogram recorded by a Wood-Anderson torsion seismometer. Finally, Richter calculated a table of distance corrections, in that for distances less than 200 kilometers the attenuation is strongly affected by the structure and properties of the regional geology.

When Richter presented the resulting scale in 1935, he called it (at the suggestion of Harry Wood) simply a "magnitude" scale. "Richter magnitude" appears to have originated when Perry Byerly told the press that the scale was Richter's and "should be referred to as such." In 1956, Gutenberg and Richter, while still referring to "magnitude scale", labelled it "local magnitude", with the symbol M_{L}, to distinguish it from two other scales they had developed, the surface wave magnitude (M_{S}) and body wave magnitude (M_{B}) scales.

The Richter magnitude of an earthquake is determined from the logarithm of the amplitude of waves recorded by seismographs (adjustments are included to compensate for the variation in the distance between the various seismographs and the epicenter of the earthquake). The original formula is:

$$M_\mathrm{L} = \log_{10} A - \log_{10} A_\mathrm{0}(\delta) = \log_{10} [A / A_\mathrm{0}(\delta)],\$$

where A is the maximum excursion of the Wood–Anderson seismograph, the empirical function A_{0} depends only on the epicentral distance of the station, $\delta$. In practice, readings from all observing stations are averaged after adjustment with station-specific corrections to obtain the M_{L} value.

== Sources ==
- Bolt, B. A. (1993), Earthquakes and geological discovery, Scientific American Library, ISBN 0-7167-5040-6.
- Boore, D. M. (September 1989), "The Richter scale: its development and use for determining earthquake source parameter" (PDF), Tectonophysics, 166 (1–3): 1–14, Bibcode:1989Tectp.166....1B, doi:10.1016/0040-1951(89)90200-x
- Chung, D. H.; Bernreuter, D. L. (1980), Regional Relationships Among Earthquake Magnitude Scales., doi:10.2172/5073993, OSTI 5073993, NUREG/CR-1457.
- Gutenberg, B.; Richter, C. F. (February 21, 1936), "Discussion: Magnitude and energy of earthquakes", Science, 83 (2147): 183–185, Bibcode:1936Sci....83..183G, doi:10.1126/science.83.2147.183, PMID 17770563.
- Gutenberg, B.; Richter, C. F. (1956b), "Earthquake magnitude, intensity, energy, and acceleration (Second Paper)", Bulletin of the Seismological Society of America, 46 (2): 105–145, doi:10.1785/BSSA0460020105.
- Hough, S. E. (2007), Richter's scale: measure of an earthquake, measure of a man, Princeton University Press, ISBN 978-0-691-12807-8.
- Hutton, L. K.; Boore, David M. (December 1987), "The M_{L} scale in Southern California" (PDF), Nature, 271 (5644): 411–414, Bibcode:1978Natur.271..411K, doi:10.1038/271411a0, S2CID 4185100, archived from the original (PDF) on September 11, 2025.
- Kanamori, Hiroo (February 2, 1978), "Quantification of Earthquakes" (PDF), Nature, 271 (5644): 411–414, Bibcode:1978Natur.271..411K, doi:10.1038/271411a0, S2CID 4185100, archived from the original (PDF) on September 11, 2025.
- Richter, C. F. (January 1935), "An Instrumental Earthquake Magnitude Scale" (PDF), Bulletin of the Seismological Society of America, 25 (1): 1–32, Bibcode:1935BuSSA..25....1R, doi:10.1785/BSSA0250010001, archived from the original (PDF) on July 10, 2018.
