= Richter scale =

Measure of the strength of earthquakes

The Richter scale (/ˈrɪktər/), also called the Richter magnitude scale, Richter's magnitude scale, and the Gutenberg–Richter scale, is a measure of the strength of earthquakes, developed by Charles Richter in collaboration with Beno Gutenberg, and presented in Richter's landmark 1935 paper, where he called it the "magnitude scale". This was later revised and renamed the local magnitude scale, denoted as ML or M_{L}.

Because of various shortcomings of the original M_{L} scale, most seismological authorities now use other similar scales such as the moment magnitude scale (M_{w}) to report earthquake magnitudes, but much of the news media still erroneously refers to these as "Richter" magnitudes. All magnitude scales retain the logarithmic character of the original and are scaled to have roughly comparable numeric values (typically in the middle of the scale). Due to the variance in earthquakes, it is essential to understand the Richter scale uses common logarithms simply to make the measurements manageable (For example, an increase from magnitude 3 to magnitude 5 corresponds to a hundredfold increase in measured seismic-wave amplitude.).

== Richter magnitudes ==
The Richter magnitude of an earthquake is determined from the logarithm of the amplitude of waves recorded by seismographs. Adjustments are included to compensate for the variation in the distance between the various seismographs and the epicenter of the earthquake. The original formula is:

$$M_\mathrm{L} = \log_{10} A - \log_{10} A_\mathrm{0}(\delta) = \log_{10} [A / A_\mathrm{0}(\delta)],\$$

where A is the maximum excursion of the Wood-Anderson seismograph, the empirical function A_{0} depends only on the epicentral distance of the station, $\delta$. In practice, readings from all observing stations are averaged after adjustment with station-specific corrections to obtain the M_{L} value.

Because of the logarithmic basis of the scale, each whole number increase in magnitude represents a tenfold increase in measured amplitude. In terms of energy, each whole number increase corresponds to an increase of about 31.6 times the amount of energy released, and each increase of 0.2 corresponds to approximately a doubling of the energy released.

Events with magnitudes greater than 4.5 are strong enough to be recorded by a seismograph anywhere in the world, so long as its sensors are not located in the earthquake's shadow.

The following describes the typical effects of earthquakes of various magnitudes near the epicenter. The values are typical and may not be exact in a future event because intensity and ground effects depend not only on the magnitude but also on (1) the distance to the epicenter, (2) the depth of the earthquake's focus beneath the epicenter, (3) the location of the epicenter, and (4) geological conditions. The following table describes the typical effects of earthquakes of various magnitudes. Magnitude is a dimensionless, logarithmic measure of earthquake size. Different magnitude scales are used depending on the earthquake's characteristics; the moment magnitude scale (M_{w}) is generally preferred for large earthquakes.

Magnitude (M)	Description	Typical maximum modified Mercalli intensity	Average earthquake effects	Average frequency of occurrence globally (estimated)
1.0–1.9	Micro	MMI I (Not felt)	Microearthquakes, not felt. Recorded by seismographs. (Note: This is what Richter wrote in his Elementary Seismology (1958), an opinion copiously reproduced afterward in Earth's science primers. Recent evidence shows that earthquakes with negative magnitudes (down to −0.7) can also be felt in exceptional cases, especially when the focus is very shallow (a few hundred meters). See: Thouvenot, F.; Bouchon, M. (2008). "What is the lowest magnitude threshold at which an earthquake can be felt or heard, or objects thrown into the air?," in Fréchet, J., Meghraoui, M. & Stucchi, M. (eds), Modern Approaches in Solid Earth Sciences (vol. 2), Historical Seismology: Interdisciplinary Studies of Past and Recent Earthquakes, Springer, Dordrecht, 313–326.)	Continual/several millions per year
2.0–2.9	Minor	MMI I (Not felt) to MMI II (Weak)	Felt slightly by some people. No damage to buildings.	Over one million per year
3.0–3.9	Slight	MMI II (Weak) to MMI III (Weak)	Often felt by people, but very rarely causes damage. Shaking of indoor objects can be noticeable.	Over 100,000 per year
4.0–4.9	Light	MMI IV (Light) to MMI V (Moderate)	Noticeable shaking of indoor objects and rattling noises. Felt by most people in the affected area. Slightly felt outside. Generally causes zero to minimal damage. Moderate to significant damage is very unlikely. Some objects may fall off shelves or be knocked over.	10,000 to 15,000 per year
5.0–5.9	Moderate	MMI VI (Strong) to MMI VII (Very strong)	Can cause damage of varying severity to poorly constructed buildings. Zero to slight damage to all other buildings. Felt by everyone.	1,000 to 1,500 per year
6.0–6.9	Strong	MMI VII (Very strong) to MMI IX (Violent)	Damage to a moderate number of well-built structures in populated areas. Earthquake-resistant structures survive with slight to moderate damage. Poorly designed structures receive moderate to severe damage. Felt in wider areas; up to hundreds of kilometers from the epicenter. Strong to violent shaking in the epicentral area.	100 to 150 per year
7.0–7.9	Major	MMI VIII (Severe) or higher	Causes damage to most buildings, some to partially or completely collapse or receive severe damage. Well-designed structures are likely to receive damage. Felt across great distances with major damage mostly limited to 250 km (160 mi) from the epicenter. Large, shallow earthquakes beneath or near the ocean may generate tsunamis and prompt tsunami alerts, depending on their characteristics.	10 to 20 per year
8.0–8.9	Great	MMI VIII (Severe) or higher	Major damage to buildings, and structures likely to be destroyed. Will cause moderate to heavy damage to sturdy or earthquake-resistant buildings. Damaging in large areas. Felt in extremely large regions.	One per year
9.0–9.9	Extreme	MMI VIII (Severe) or higher	Can cause catastrophic destruction across extensive areas, particularly near the rupture zone. Heavy damage and shaking extend to distant locations. Permanent changes in ground topography.	One to three per century

(Based on U.S. Geological Survey documents.)

The intensity and death toll depend on several factors (earthquake depth, epicenter location, and population density, to name a few) and can vary widely.

Millions of minor earthquakes occur every year worldwide, equating to hundreds every hour every day. On the other hand, earthquakes of magnitude ≥8.0 occur about once a year, on average. The largest recorded earthquake was the Great Chilean earthquake of May 22, 1960, which had a magnitude of 9.5 on the moment magnitude scale.

Seismologist Susan Hough has suggested that a magnitude 10 quake may represent a very approximate upper limit for what the Earth's tectonic zones are capable of, which would be the result of the largest known continuous belt of faults rupturing together (along the Pacific coast of the Americas). A research at the Tohoku University in Japan found that a magnitude 10 earthquake was theoretically possible if a combined 3,000 kilometres (1,900 mi) of faults from the Japan Trench to the Kuril–Kamchatka Trench ruptured together and moved by 60 metres (200 ft) (or if a similar large-scale rupture occurred elsewhere). Such an earthquake would cause ground motions for up to an hour, with tsunamis hitting shores while the ground is still shaking, and if this kind of earthquake occurred, it would probably be a 1-in-10,000-year event.

== Development ==
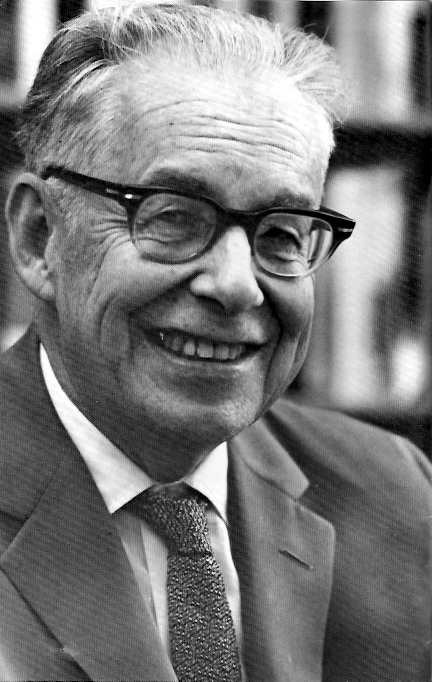
Charles Richter (c. 1970)

Prior to the development of the magnitude scale, the only measure of an earthquake's strength or "size" was a subjective assessment of the intensity of shaking observed near the epicenter of the earthquake, categorized by various seismic intensity scales such as the Rossi–Forel scale. ("Size" is used in the sense of the quantity of energy released, not the size of the area affected by shaking, though higher-energy earthquakes do tend to affect a wider area, depending on the local geology.) In 1883, John Milne surmised that the shaking of large earthquakes might generate waves detectable around the globe, and in 1899 E. Von Rehbur Paschvitz observed in Germany seismic waves attributable to an earthquake in Tokyo. In the 1920s, Harry O. Wood and John A. Anderson developed the Wood–Anderson seismograph, one of the first practical instruments for recording seismic waves. Wood then built, under the auspices of the California Institute of Technology and the Carnegie Institute, a network of seismographs stretching across Southern California. He also recruited the young and unknown Charles Richter to measure the seismograms and locate the earthquakes generating the seismic waves.

In 1931, Kiyoo Wadati showed how he had measured, for several strong earthquakes in Japan, the amplitude of the shaking observed at various distances from the epicenter. He then plotted the logarithm of the amplitude against the distance and found a series of curves that showed a rough correlation with the estimated magnitudes of the earthquakes. Richter resolved some difficulties with this method and then, using data collected by his colleague Beno Gutenberg, he produced similar curves, confirming that they could be used to compare the relative magnitudes of different earthquakes.

Additional developments were required to produce a practical method of assigning an absolute measure of magnitude. First, to span the wide range of possible values, Richter adopted Gutenberg's suggestion of a logarithmic scale, where each step represents a tenfold increase of magnitude, similar to the magnitude scale used by astronomers for star brightness. Second, he wanted a magnitude of zero to be around the limit of human perceptibility. Third, he specified the Wood–Anderson seismograph as the standard instrument for producing seismograms. Magnitude was then defined as "the logarithm of the maximum trace amplitude, expressed in microns", measured at a distance of 100 km (62 mi). The scale was calibrated by defining a magnitude 0 shock as one that produces (at a distance of 100 km (62 mi)) a maximum amplitude of 1 μm (0.001 mm) on a seismogram recorded by a Wood-Anderson torsion seismometer. Finally, Richter calculated a table of distance corrections, in that for distances less than 200 kilometres (120 mi) the attenuation is strongly affected by the structure and properties of the regional geology.

When Richter presented the resulting scale in 1935, he called it (at the suggestion of Harry Wood) simply a "magnitude" scale. "Richter magnitude" appears to have originated when Perry Byerly told the press that the scale was Richter's and "should be referred to as such." In 1956, Gutenberg and Richter, while still referring to "magnitude scale", labelled it "local magnitude", with the symbol M_{L}, to distinguish it from two other scales they had developed, the surface-wave magnitude (M_{s}) and body wave magnitude (M_{B}) scales.

== Details ==
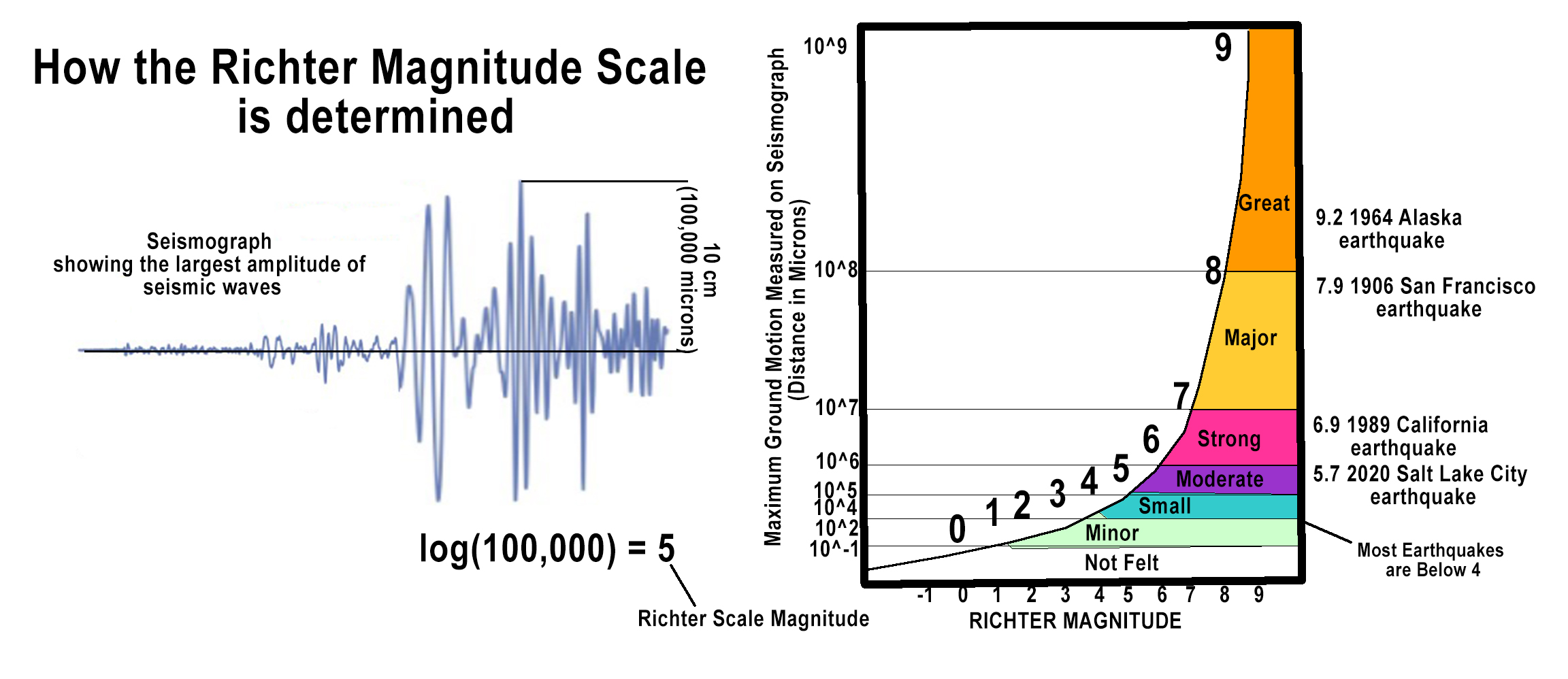
How Richter magnitude is determined – the larger the value on the log graph, the higher the damage caused.

The Richter scale was defined in 1935 for particular circumstances and instruments; the particular circumstances refer to it being defined for Southern California and "implicitly incorporates the attenuative properties of Southern California crust and mantle." The particular instrument used would become saturated by strong earthquakes and unable to record high values. Introduced in 1979, the moment magnitude scale (MMS, symbol M_{w}) gradually became the preferred method for measuring large earthquakes, although the local magnitude scale remains in use for smaller, nearby earthquakes. For earthquakes adequately measured by the Richter scale, numerical values are approximately the same. Although values measured for earthquakes now are M_{w}, they are frequently reported by the press as Richter values, even for earthquakes of magnitude over 8, when the Richter scale becomes meaningless.

The Richter scale measures earthquake magnitude based on the amplitude of seismic waves, while the moment magnitude scale (MMS, symbol M_{w}) measures magnitude based on seismic moment, which depends on the rigidity of the rocks, the area of the fault rupture, and the average amount of slip. Neither scale directly measures the seismic energy radiated by an earthquake, although magnitude and energy release are related. The energy magnitude scale (M_{e}) provides a measure based on radiated seismic energy.

The Mercalli intensity scale, by contrast, describes the intensity of shaking and its effects at a particular location. These effects depend on factors such as earthquake depth, distance from the rupture, local geological conditions, and building construction.

Several scales have been historically described as the "Richter scale", especially the local magnitude M_{L} and the surface wave M_{s} scale. In addition, the body wave magnitude, M_{b}, and the moment magnitude, M_{w}, abbreviated MMS, have been widely used for decades. A couple of new techniques to measure magnitude are in the development stage by seismologists.

All magnitude scales have been designed to give numerically similar results. This goal has been achieved well for M_{L}, M_{s}, and M_{w}. The M_{b} scale gives somewhat different values than the other scales. The reason for so many different ways to measure the same thing is that at different distances, for different hypocentral depths, and for different earthquake sizes, the amplitudes of different types of elastic waves must be measured.

M_{L} is the scale used for the majority of earthquakes reported (tens of thousands) by local and regional seismological observatories. For large earthquakes worldwide, the moment magnitude scale (MMS) is most common, although M_{s} is also reported frequently.

The seismic moment, M_{0}, is proportional to the area of the rupture times the average slip that took place in the earthquake, thus it measures the physical size of the event. M_{w} is derived from it empirically as a quantity without units, just a number designed to conform to the M_{s} scale. A spectral analysis is required to obtain M_{0}. In contrast, the other magnitudes are derived from a simple measurement of the amplitude of a precisely defined wave.

All scales, except M_{w}, saturate for large earthquakes, meaning they are based on the amplitudes of waves that have a wavelength shorter than the rupture length of the earthquakes. These short waves (high-frequency waves) are too short a yardstick to measure the extent of the event. The resulting effective upper limit of measurement for M_{L} is about 7 and about 8.5 for M_{s}.

New techniques to avoid the saturation problem and to measure magnitudes rapidly for very large earthquakes are being developed. One of these is based on the long-period P-wave; The other is based on a recently discovered channel wave.

The energy release of an earthquake, which closely correlates to its destructive power, scales with the 3/2 power of the shaking amplitude (see Moment magnitude scale for an explanation). Thus, a difference in magnitude of 1.0 is equivalent to a factor of 31.6 ($=({10^{1.0}})^{(3/2)}$) in the energy released; a difference in magnitude of 2.0 is equivalent to a factor of 1000 ($=({10^{2.0}})^{(3/2)}$) in the energy released. The elastic energy radiated is best derived from an integration of the radiated spectrum, but an estimate can be based on M_{b} because most energy is carried by the high-frequency waves.

== Magnitude empirical formulae ==
These formulae for Richter magnitude M_{L} are alternatives to using Richter correlation tables based on Richter standard seismic event $\big(\ M_\mathsf{L} = 0\ ,$ $\ A = 0.001\ \mathsf{mm}\ ,$ $\ D=100\ \mathsf{km}\ \big) ~.$ In the formulas below, $\ \Delta\$ is the epicentral distance in kilometers, and $\ \Delta^{\circ}\$ is the same distance represented as sea level great circle degrees.

The Lillie empirical formula is:

$$\ M_\mathsf{L} = \log_{10} A - 2.48 + 2.76\ \log_{10} \Delta\$$
where $\ A\$ is the amplitude (maximum ground displacement) of the P wave, in micrometers (μm), measured at 0.8 Hz.

Lahr's empirical formula proposal is:

$$\ M_\mathsf{L} = \log_{10} A + 1.6\ \log_{10} D - 0.15\ ,$$
where

$\ A\$ is seismograph signal amplitude in mm and
$\ D\$ is in km, for distances under 200 km (120 mi).

and

$$\ M_\mathsf{L} = \log_{10} A + 3.0\ \log_{10} D - 3.38\ ;$$
where $\ D\$ is in km, for distances between 200 and 600 km (120 and 370 mi).

The Bisztricsany empirical formula (1958) for epicentre distances between 4° and 160° is:

$$\ M_\mathsf{L} = 2.92 + 2.25\ \log_{10} \left( \tau \right) - 0.001\ \Delta^{\circ}\ ,$$
where

$\ \tau\$ is the duration of the surface wave in seconds, and
$\ \Delta^{\circ}\$ is in degrees.
$\ M_\mathsf{L}\$ is mainly between M_{L} 5-8.

The Tsumura empirical formula is:

$$\ M_\mathsf{L} = -2.53 + 2.85 \log_{10} \left(F - P\right) + 0.0014\ \Delta^{\circ}\ ,$$
where

$\ F - P\$ is the total duration of oscillation in seconds.
$\ M_\mathsf{L}\$ mainly takes on values between M_{L} 3-5.

The Tsuboi (University of Tokyo) empirical formula is:

$$\ M_\mathsf{L} = \log_{10} A + 1.73\ \log_{10} \Delta - 0.83\ ,$$
where $\ A\$ is the amplitude in μm.

== See also ==
- 1935 in science
- Seismic intensity scales
- Seismic magnitude scales
- Timeline of United States inventions (1890–1945)

== Sources ==
- Bolt, B. A. (1993), Earthquakes and geological discovery, Scientific American Library, ISBN 0-7167-5040-6.
- Boore, D. M. (September 1989), "The Richter scale: its development and use for determining earthquake source parameter" (PDF), Tectonophysics, 166 (1–3): 1–14, doi:10.1016/0040-1951(89)90200-x
- Chung, D. H.; Bernreuter, D. L. (1980), Regional Relationships Among Earthquake Magnitude Scales., NUREG/CR-1457.
- Gutenberg, B.; Richter, C. F. (February 21, 1936), "Discussion: Magnitude and energy of earthquakes", Science, 83 (2147): 183–185, Bibcode:1936Sci....83..183G, doi:10.1126/science.83.2147.183, PMID 17770563.
- Gutenberg, B.; Richter, C. F. (1956), "Earthquake magnitude, intensity, energy, and acceleration (Second paper)", Bulletin of the Seismological Society of America, 46 (2): 105–145, doi:10.1785/BSSA0460020105
- Hough, S. E. (2007), Richter's scale: measure of an earthquake, measure of a man, Princeton University Press, ISBN 978-0-691-12807-8.
- Hutton, L. K.; Boore, David M. (1987), "The M_{L} scale in Southern California", Bulletin of the Seismological Society of America, 77 (6): 2074–2094, doi:10.1785/BSSA0770062074.
- Kanamori, Hiroo (February 2, 1978), "Quantification of Earthquakes" (PDF), Nature, 271 (5644): 411–414, Bibcode:1978Natur.271..411K, doi:10.1038/271411a0, archived from the original (PDF) on September 11, 2025.
- Richter, C. F. (January 1935), "An Instrumental Earthquake Magnitude Scale" (PDF), Bulletin of the Seismological Society of America, 25 (1): 1–32, archived from the original (PDF) on July 10, 2018.
