= Moment magnitude scale =

Measure of earthquake size

The moment magnitude scale (MMS; denoted explicitly with M_{w} or Mwg and generally implied with use of a single M for magnitude) is a measure of an earthquake's magnitude ("size" or strength) based on its seismic moment. M_{w} was defined in a 1979 paper by Thomas C. Hanks and Hiroo Kanamori. Before Hanks and Kanamori (1979) , Kanamori (1977) developed Mw scale for large earthquakes above 7.5. Thus Mw and M are not the same mathematically even though they are considered the same. Similar to the local magnitude/Richter scale (M_{L}) defined by Charles Francis Richter in 1935, it uses a logarithmic scale; small earthquakes have approximately the same magnitudes on both scales. Despite the difference, news media often use the term "Richter scale" when referring to the moment magnitude scale.

Moment magnitude (M_{w}) is considered the authoritative magnitude scale for ranking earthquakes by size. It is more directly related to the energy of an earthquake than other scales, and does not saturate – that is, it does not underestimate magnitudes as other scales do in certain conditions. It has become the standard scale used by seismological authorities like the United States Geological Survey for reporting large earthquakes (typically M > 4), replacing the local magnitude (M_{L}) and surface-wave magnitude (M_{s}) scales. Subtypes of the moment magnitude scale (M_{ww}, etc.) reflect different ways of estimating the seismic moment.

== History ==
=== Richter scale: the original measure of earthquake magnitude ===
At the beginning of the twentieth century, very little was known about how earthquakes happen, how seismic waves are generated and propagate through the Earth's crust, and what information they carry about the earthquake rupture process; the first magnitude scales were therefore empirical. The initial step in determining earthquake magnitudes empirically came in 1931 when the Japanese seismologist Kiyoo Wadati showed that the maximum amplitude of an earthquake's seismic waves diminished with distance at a certain rate. Charles F. Richter then worked out how to adjust for epicentral distance (and some other factors) so that the logarithm of the amplitude of the seismograph trace could be used as a measure of "magnitude" that was internally consistent and corresponded roughly with estimates of an earthquake's energy. He established a reference point and the ten-fold (exponential) scaling of each degree of magnitude, and in 1935 published what he called the "magnitude scale", now called the local magnitude scale, labeled M_{L}. (This scale is also known as the Richter scale, but news media sometimes use that term indiscriminately to refer to other similar scales.)

The local magnitude scale was developed on the basis of shallow (~15 km (9 mi) deep), moderate-sized earthquakes at a distance of approximately 100 to 600 km (62 to 373 mi), conditions where the surface waves are predominant. At greater depths, distances, or magnitudes the surface waves are greatly reduced, and the local magnitude scale underestimates the magnitude, a problem called saturation. Additional scales were developed – a surface-wave magnitude scale (M_{s}) by Beno Gutenberg in 1945, a body-wave magnitude scale (mB) by Gutenberg and Richter in 1956, and a number of variants – to overcome the deficiencies of the M_{L} scale, but all are subject to saturation. A particular problem was that the M_{s} scale (which in the 1970s was the preferred magnitude scale) saturates around M_{s} 8.0 and therefore underestimates the energy release of "great" earthquakes such as the 1960 Chilean and 1964 Alaskan earthquakes. These had M_{s} magnitudes of 8.5 and 8.4 respectively but were notably more powerful than other M 8 earthquakes; their moment magnitudes were closer to 9.6 and 9.3, respectively.

=== Single couple or double couple ===
The study of earthquakes is challenging as the source events cannot be observed directly, and it took many years to develop the mathematics for understanding what the seismic waves from an earthquake can tell about the source event. An early step was to determine how different systems of forces might generate seismic waves equivalent to those observed from earthquakes.

The simplest force system is a single force acting on an object. If it has sufficient strength to overcome any resistance it will cause the object to move ("translate"). A pair of forces, acting on the same "line of action" but in opposite directions, will cancel; if they cancel (balance) exactly there will be no net translation, though the object will experience stress, either tension or compression. If the pair of forces are offset, acting along parallel but separate lines of action, the object experiences a rotational force, or torque. In mechanics (the branch of physics concerned with the interactions of forces) this model is called a couple, also simple couple or single couple. If a second couple of equal and opposite magnitude is applied, their torques cancel; this is called a double couple. A double couple can be viewed as "equivalent to a pressure and tension acting simultaneously at right angles".

The single couple and double couple models are important in seismology because each can be used to derive how the seismic waves generated by an earthquake event should appear in the "far field" (that is, at distance). Once that relation is understood it can be inverted to use the earthquake's observed seismic waves to determine its other characteristics, including fault geometry and seismic moment.

In 1923 Hiroshi Nakano showed that certain aspects of seismic waves could be explained in terms of a double couple model. This led to a three-decade-long controversy over the best way to model the seismic source: as a single couple, or a double couple. While Japanese seismologists favored the double couple, most seismologists favored the single couple. Although the single couple model had some shortcomings, it seemed more intuitive, and there was a belief – mistaken, as it turned out – that the elastic rebound theory for explaining why earthquakes happen required a single couple model. In principle these models could be distinguished by differences in the radiation patterns of their S waves, but the quality of the observational data was inadequate for that.

The debate ended when Maruyama (1963), Haskell (1964), and Burridge and Knopoff (1964) showed that if earthquake ruptures are modeled as dislocations the pattern of seismic radiation can always be matched with an equivalent pattern derived from a double couple, but not from a single couple. This was confirmed as better and more plentiful data coming from the World-Wide Standard Seismograph Network (WWSSN) permitted closer analysis of seismic waves. Notably, in 1966 Keiiti Aki showed that the seismic moment of the 1964 Niigata earthquake as calculated from the seismic waves on the basis of a double couple was in reasonable agreement with the seismic moment calculated from the observed physical dislocation.

=== Dislocation theory ===
A double couple model suffices to explain an earthquake's far-field pattern of seismic radiation, but tells us very little about the nature of an earthquake's source mechanism or its physical features. While slippage along a fault was theorized as the cause of earthquakes (other theories included movement of magma, or sudden changes of volume due to phase changes), observing this at depth was not possible, and understanding what could be learned about the source mechanism from the seismic waves requires an understanding of the source mechanism.

Modeling the physical process by which an earthquake generates seismic waves required much theoretical development of dislocation theory, first formulated by the Italian Vito Volterra in 1907, with further developments by E. H. Love in 1927. More generally applied to problems of stress in materials, an extension by F. Nabarro in 1951 was recognized by the Russian geophysicist N. V. Vvedenskaya as applicable to earthquake faulting. In a series of papers starting in 1956 she and other colleagues used dislocation theory to determine part of an earthquake's focal mechanism, and to show that a dislocation – a rupture accompanied by slipping – was indeed equivalent to a double couple.

In a pair of papers in 1958, J. A. Steketee worked out how to relate dislocation theory to geophysical features. Numerous other researchers worked out other details, culminating in a general solution in 1964 by Burridge and Knopoff, which established the relationship between double couples and the theory of elastic rebound, and provided the basis for relating an earthquake's physical features to seismic moment.

=== Seismic moment ===
Seismic moment – symbol M_{0} – is a measure of the fault slip and area involved in the earthquake. Its value is the torque of each of the two force couples that form the earthquake's equivalent double-couple. (More precisely, it is the scalar magnitude of the second-order moment tensor that describes the force components of the double-couple.) Seismic moment is measured in units of Newton meters (N·m) or Joules, or (in the older CGS system) dyne-centimeters (dyn-cm).

The first calculation of an earthquake's seismic moment from its seismic waves was by Keiiti Aki for the 1964 Niigata earthquake. He did this two ways. First, he used data from distant stations of the WWSSN to analyze long-period (200 second) seismic waves (wavelength of about 1,000 kilometers) to determine the magnitude of the earthquake's equivalent double couple. Second, he drew upon the work of Burridge and Knopoff on dislocation to determine the amount of slip, the energy released, and the stress drop (essentially how much of the potential energy was released). In particular, he derived an equation that relates an earthquake's seismic moment to its physical parameters:

M_{0} = μūS

with μ being the rigidity (or resistance to moving) of a fault with a surface area of S over an average dislocation (distance) of ū. (Modern formulations replace ūS with the equivalent D̄A, known as the "geometric moment" or "potency".) By this equation the moment determined from the double couple of the seismic waves can be related to the moment calculated from knowledge of the surface area of fault slippage and the amount of slip. In the case of the Niigata earthquake the dislocation estimated from the seismic moment reasonably approximated the observed dislocation.

Seismic moment is a measure of the work (more precisely, the torque) that results in inelastic (permanent) displacement or distortion of the Earth's crust. It is related to the total energy released by an earthquake. However, the power or potential destructiveness of an earthquake depends (among other factors) on how much of the total energy is converted into seismic waves. This is typically 10% or less of the total energy, the rest being expended in fracturing rock or overcoming friction (generating heat).

Nonetheless, seismic moment is regarded as the fundamental measure of earthquake size, representing more directly than other parameters the physical size of an earthquake. As early as 1975 it was considered "one of the most reliably determined instrumental earthquake source parameters".

=== Limitation of M_{w} ===
1) The Mw scale was originally developed and calibrated for Southern California earthquakes, and its universal applicability to all tectonic regions remains a subject of investigation.

2) The use of Mw scale below 7.5 is mathematically incorrect at global level

3) The derivation of Mw scale depends on constants in the seismic moment–energy relationship; different constants may lead to different magnitude Mw scale.

4) The original derivation of the Mw scale was based primarily on shallow, surface-wave-dominated earthquakes, raising concerns about its applicability to intermediate- and deep-focus earthquakes.

5. Mw is less consistent at lower and medium magnitudes and does not always agree with other magnitude scales (e.g., mb and Ms).

6. Mw is based on seismic moment and does not always provide a consistent measure of radiated seismic energy.

7) The original magnitude (M) and the moment magnitude (Mw) are not identical, with Mw differing from M by approximately 0.03 magnitude units.

Most earthquake magnitude scales suffered from the fact that they only provided a comparison of the amplitude of waves produced at a standard distance and frequency band; it was difficult to relate these magnitudes to a physical property of the earthquake. Gutenberg and Richter suggested that radiated energy E_{s} could be estimated as

$$\log_{10}E_s\approx4.8+1.5M_S$$,

(in Joules). Unfortunately, the duration of many very large earthquakes was longer than 20 seconds, the period of the surface waves used in the measurement of M_{s}. This meant that giant earthquakes such as the 1960 Chilean earthquake (M 9.5) were only assigned an M_{s} 8.2. Caltech seismologist Hiroo Kanamori recognized this deficiency and took the simple but important step of defining a magnitude based on estimates of radiated energy, M_{w}, where the "w" stood for work (energy):

$$M_w=2/3\log_{10}E_s-3.2$$

Kanamori recognized that measurement of radiated energy is technically difficult since it involves the integration of wave energy over the entire frequency band. To simplify this calculation, he noted that the lowest frequency parts of the spectrum can often be used to estimate the rest of the spectrum. The lowest frequency asymptote of a seismic spectrum is characterized by the seismic moment, M_{0}. Using an approximate relation between radiated energy and seismic moment (which assumes stress drop is complete and ignores fracture energy),

$$E_s\approx M_0/(2\times10^4)$$

(where E is in Joules and M_{0} is in N$\cdot$m), Kanamori approximated M_{w} by

$$M_w=(\log_{10}M_0-9.1)/1.5$$

=== Moment magnitude scale ===
The formula above made it much easier to estimate the energy-based magnitude M_{w}, but it changed the fundamental nature of the scale into a moment magnitude scale. USGS seismologist Thomas C. Hanks noted that Kanamori's M_{w} scale was very similar to a relationship between M_{L} and M_{0} that was reported by Thatcher & Hanks (1973)

$$M_L\approx(\log_{10}M_0-9.0)/1.5$$

Hanks & Kanamori (1979) combined their work to define a new magnitude scale based on estimates of seismic moment

$$M=(\log_{10}M_0-9.05)/1.5$$

where $M_0$ is defined in newton meters (N·m).

== Current use ==
Moment magnitude is now the most common measure of earthquake size for medium to large earthquake magnitudes, but in practice, seismic moment (M_{0}), the seismological parameter it is based on, is not measured routinely for smaller quakes. For example, the United States Geological Survey does not use this scale for earthquakes with a magnitude of less than 3.5, which includes the great majority of quakes.

Popular press reports most often deal with significant earthquakes larger than M ~ 4. For these events, the preferred magnitude is the moment magnitude M_{w}, not Richter's local magnitude M_{L}.

== Definition ==
The symbol for the moment magnitude scale is M_{w}, with the subscript "w" meaning mechanical work accomplished. The moment magnitude M_{w} is a dimensionless value defined by Hiroo Kanamori as

$$M_\mathrm{w} = {\frac{2}{3}}\log_{10}(M_0) - 10.7,$$

where M_{0} is the seismic moment in dyne⋅cm (10^{−7} N⋅m). The constant values in the equation are chosen to achieve consistency with the magnitude values produced by earlier scales, such as the local magnitude and the surface wave magnitude. Thus, a magnitude zero microearthquake has a seismic moment of approximately 1.1×10^{9} N⋅m, while the Great Chilean earthquake of 1960, with an estimated moment magnitude of 9.4–9.6, had a seismic moment between 1.4×10^{23} N⋅m and 2.8×10^{23} N⋅m.

Seismic moment magnitude (M _{wg} or Das Magnitude Scale ) and moment magnitude (M _{w}) scales

To understand the magnitude scales based on M_{o} detailed background of M_{wg} and M_{w} scales is given below.

M_{w} scale

Hiroo Kanamori defined a magnitude scale (Log W_{0} = 1.5 M_{w} + 11.8, where W_{0} is the minimum strain energy) for great earthquakes using Gutenberg Richter Eq. (1).

Log E_{s} = 1.5 M_{s} + 11.8 (A)

Kanamori used W_{0} in place of E_{s} (dyn.cm) and consider a constant term (W_{0}/M_{o} = 5 × 10^{−5}) in Eq. (A) and estimated M_{s} and denoted as M_{w} (dyn.cm). The energy Eq. (A) is derived by substituting m = 2.5 + 0.63 M in the energy equation Log E = 5.8 + 2.4 m (Richter 1958), where m is the Gutenberg unified magnitude and M is a least squares approximation to the magnitude determined from surface wave magnitudes. After replacing the ratio of seismic Energy (E) and Seismic Moment (M_{o}), i.e., E/M_{o} = 5 × 10^{−5}, into the Gutenberg–Richter energy magnitude Eq. (A), Hanks and Kanamori provided Eq. (B):

Log M_{0} = 1.5 M_{s} + 16.1 (B)

Note that Eq. (B) was already derived by Kanamori and termed it as M_{w}. Eq. (B) was based on large earthquakes; hence, in order to validate Eq. (B) for intermediate and smaller earthquakes, Hanks and Kanamori (1979) compared this Eq. (B) with Eq. (1) of Percaru and Berckhemer (1978) for the magnitude 5.0 ≤ M_{s} ≤ 7.5 (Hanks and Kanamori 1979). Note that Eq. (1) of Percaru and Berckhemer (1978) for the magnitude range 5.0 ≤ M_{s} ≤ 7.5 is not reliable due to the inconsistency of defined magnitude range (moderate to large earthquakes defined as M_{s} ≤ 7.0 and M_{s} = 7–7.5) and scarce data in lower magnitude range (≤ 7.0) which rarely represents the global seismicity (e.g., see Figs. 1A, B, 4 and Table 2 of Percaru and Berckhemer 1978). Furthermore, Equation (1) of Percaru and Berckhemer 1978) is only valid for (≤ 7.0).

The Das Magnitude Scale (Mwg)

is an energy-based earthquake magnitude scale defined as

$M_{wg}=\frac{\log_{10}M_0}{1.36}-12.68$

== Relations between seismic moment, potential energy released and radiated energy ==
Seismic moment is not a direct measure of energy changes during an earthquake. The relations between seismic moment and the energies involved in an earthquake depend on parameters that have large uncertainties and that may vary between earthquakes. Potential energy is stored in the crust in the form of elastic energy due to built-up stress and gravitational energy. During an earthquake, a portion $\Delta W$ of this stored energy is transformed into

- energy dissipated $E_f$ in frictional weakening and inelastic deformation in rocks by processes such as the creation of cracks
- heat $E_h$
- radiated seismic energy $E_s$

The potential energy drop caused by an earthquake is related approximately to its seismic moment by

$$\Delta W \approx \frac{\overline\sigma}{\mu} M_0$$

where $\overline\sigma$ is the average of the absolute shear stresses on the fault before and after the earthquake (e.g., equation 3 of Venkataraman & Kanamori 2004) and $\mu$ is the average of the shear moduli of the rocks that constitute the fault. Currently, there is no technology to measure absolute stresses at all depths of interest, nor method to estimate it accurately, and $\overline\sigma$ is thus poorly known. It could vary highly from one earthquake to another. Two earthquakes with identical $M_0$ but different $\overline\sigma$ would have released different $\Delta W$.

The radiated energy caused by an earthquake is approximately related to seismic moment by

$$E_\mathrm{s} \approx \eta_R \frac{\Delta\sigma_s}{2\mu} M_0$$

where $\eta_R = E_s /(E_s+E_f)$ is radiated efficiency and $\Delta\sigma_s$ is the static stress drop, i.e., the difference between shear stresses on the fault before and after the earthquake (e.g., from equation 1 of Venkataraman & Kanamori 2004). These two quantities are far from being constants. For instance, $\eta_R$ depends on rupture speed; it is close to 1 for regular earthquakes but much smaller for slower earthquakes such as tsunami earthquakes and slow earthquakes. Two earthquakes with identical $M_0$ but different $\eta_R$ or $\Delta\sigma_s$ would have radiated different $E_\mathrm{s}$.

Because $E_\mathrm{s}$ and $M_0$ are fundamentally independent properties of an earthquake source, and since $E_\mathrm{s}$ can now be computed more directly and robustly than in the 1970s, introducing a separate magnitude associated to radiated energy was warranted. Choy and Boatwright defined in 1995 the energy magnitude

$$M_\mathrm{E} =  \textstyle{\frac{2}{3}}\log_{10}E_\mathrm{s} -3.2$$

where $E_\mathrm{s}$ is in J (N·m).

== Comparative energy released by two earthquakes ==
Assuming the values of σ̄/μ are the same for all earthquakes, one can consider M_{w} as a measure of the potential energy change ΔW caused by earthquakes. Similarly, if one assumes $\eta_R \Delta\sigma_s/2\mu$ is the same for all earthquakes, one can consider M_{w} as a measure of the energy E_{s} radiated by earthquakes.

Under these assumptions, the following formula, obtained by solving for M_{0} the equation defining M_{w}, allows one to assess the ratio $E_1/E_2$ of energy release (potential or radiated) between two earthquakes of different moment magnitudes, $m_1$ and $m_2$:

$$E_1/E_2\approx10^{\frac{3}{2}(m_1-m_2)}$$.

As with the Richter scale, an increase of one step on the logarithmic scale of moment magnitude corresponds to a 10^{1.5} ≈ 32 times increase in the amount of energy released, and an increase of two steps corresponds to a 10^{3} = 1,000 times increase in energy. Thus, an earthquake of M_{w} of 7.0 releases 1,000 times as much energy as one of 5.0 and about 32 times that of 6.0.

=== Comparison with TNT equivalents ===
To make the significance of the magnitude value plausible, the seismic energy released during the earthquake is sometimes compared to the effect of the conventional chemical explosive TNT. The seismic energy $E_\mathrm{S}$ results from the above-mentioned formula according to Gutenberg and Richter to

$$E_\mathrm{S} = 10^{\;\!1.5 \cdot M_\mathrm{S} + 4.8}$$

or converted into Hiroshima bombs:

$$E_\mathrm{S}= \frac{10^{\;\!1.5 \cdot M_\mathrm{S} + 4.8}}{5.25\cdot10^{13}} = 10^{\;\!1.5 \cdot M_\mathrm{S} - 8.92}$$

For comparison of seismic energy (in joules) with the corresponding explosion energy, a value of 4.2 billion joules per ton of TNT applies. The table illustrates the relationship between seismic energy and moment magnitude.

| M_{w} | E_{S} (Joules) | TNT- equivalency (tons) | equivalence Hiroshima- bomb (12.5 kT TNT) |
|---|---|---|---|
| 3 | 2.0 · 10^{9} | 0.475 | 0.000038 |
| 4 | 6.3 · 10^{10} | 15 | 0.0012 |
| 5 | 2.0 · 10^{12} | 475 | 0.038 |
| 6 | 6.3 · 10^{13} | 15,000 | 1.2 |
| 7 | 2.0 · 10^{15} | 475,000 | 38 |
| 8 | 6.3 · 10^{16} | 15,000,000 | 1,200 |
| 9 | 2.0 · 10^{18} | 475,000,000 | 38,000 |
| 10 | 6.3 · 10^{19} | 15,000,000,000 | 1,200,000 |

The end of the scale is at the value 10.6, corresponding to the assumption that at this value the Earth's crust would have to break apart completely.

== Subtypes of M_{w} ==
Various ways of determining moment magnitude have been developed, and several subtypes of the M_{w} scale can be used to indicate the basis used.

- Mwb – Based on moment tensor inversion of long-period (~10–100 s) body-waves.
- Mwr – From a moment tensor inversion of complete waveforms at regional distances (~1,000 miles). Sometimes called RMT.
- Mwc – Derived from a centroid moment tensor inversion of intermediate- and long-period body- and surface-waves.
- Mww – Derived from a centroid moment tensor inversion of the W-phase.
- Mwp (Mi) – Developed by Seiji Tsuboi for quick estimation of the tsunami potential of large near-coastal earthquakes from measurements of the P waves, and later extended to teleseismic earthquakes in general.
- Mwpd – A duration-amplitude procedure which takes into account the duration of the rupture, providing a fuller picture of the energy released by longer lasting ("slow") ruptures than seen with M_{w}.
- Mdt – Rapidly estimates earthquake magnitude by combining maximum displacements of teleseismic P wave and source durations.

== See also ==
- Earthquake engineering
- Lists of earthquakes
- Seismic magnitude scales

== Sources ==
- Abe, Katsuyuki (1982), "Magnitude, seismic moment and apparent stress for major deep earthquakes", Journal of Physics of the Earth, 30 (4): 321–330, Bibcode:1982JPE....30..321A, doi:10.4294/jpe1952.30.321
- Aki, Keiiti (1966a), "Generation and propagation of G waves from the Niigata earthquake of June 14, 1964. Part 1. A statistical analysis" (PDF), Bulletin of the Earthquake Research Institute, vol. 44, pp. 23–72
- Aki, Keiiti (1966b), "Generation and propagation of G waves from the Niigata earthquake of June 14, 1964. Part 2. Estimation of earthquake moment, released energy and stress-strain drop from G wave spectrum" (PDF), Bulletin of the Earthquake Research Institute, vol. 44, pp. 73–88
- Aki, Keiiti (April 1972), "Earthquake Mechanism", Tectonophysics, 13 (1–4): 423–446, Bibcode:1972Tectp..13..423A, doi:10.1016/0040-1951(72)90032-7
- Aki, Keiiti; Richards, Paul G. (2002), Quantitative Seismology (2nd ed.), University Science Books, ISBN 0-935702-96-2
- Ben-Menahem, Ari (August 1995), "A Concise History of Mainstream Seismology: Origins, Legacy, and Perspectives" (PDF), Bulletin of the Seismological Society of America, vol. 85, no. 4, pp. 1202–1225
- Beroza, G. C.; Kanamori, Hiroo (2015), "4.01 Earthquake Seismologoy: An Introduction and Overview", in Schubert, Gerald (ed.), Treatise on Geophysics, vol. 4: Earthquake Seismology (2nd ed.), doi:10.1016/B978-0-444-53802-4.00069-5, ISBN 978-0-444-53802-4
- Bormann; Di Giacomo (2011), "The moment magnitude M_{w} and the energy magnitude M_{e}: common roots and differences", Journal of Seismology, 15 (2): 411–427, Bibcode:2011JSeis..15..411B, doi:10.1007/s10950-010-9219-2, S2CID 130294359
- Bormann, Peter; Saul, Joachim (2009), "Earthquake Magnitude" (PDF), Encyclopedia of Complexity and Applied Systems Science, vol. 3, pp. 2473–2496
- Bormann, Peter; Wendt, Siegfried; Di Giacomo, Dominico (2013), "Chapter 3: Seismic Sources and Source Parameters", in Bormann (ed.), New Manual of Seismological Observatory Practice 2 (NMSOP-2), doi:10.2312/GFZ.NMSOP-2_ch3, archived from the original (PDF) on 2019-08-04
- Boyle, Alan (May 12, 2008), Quakes by the numbers, MSNBC, archived from the original on May 13, 2008, "That original scale has been tweaked through the decades, and nowadays calling it the "Richter scale" is an anachronism. The most common measure is known simply as the moment magnitude scale."
- Byerly, Perry (20 May 1960), "Earthquake Mechanisms", Science, 131 (3412): 1493–1496, Bibcode:1960Sci...131.1493B, doi:10.1126/science.131.3412.1493, PMID 17802489.
- Choy, George L.; Boatwright, John L. (10 September 1995), "Global patterns of radiated seismic energy and apparent stress", Journal of Geophysical Research, 100 (B9): 18205–18228, Bibcode:1995JGR...10018205C, doi:10.1029/95JB01969, archived from the original on 6 June 2011
- Dahlen, F. A. (February 1977), "The balance of energy in earthquake faulting", Geophysical Journal International, 48 (2): 239–2261, Bibcode:1977GeoJ...48..239D, doi:10.1111/j.1365-246X.1977.tb01298.x
- Deichmann, Nicholas (August 2006), "Local Magnitude, a Moment Revisited", Bulletin of the Seismological Society of America, 96 (4a): 1267–1277, Bibcode:2006BuSSA..96.1267D, doi:10.1785/0120050115
- Dziewonski; Chou; Woodhouse (April 10, 1981), "Determination of earthquake source parameters from waveform data for studies of global and regional seismicity" (PDF), Journal of Geophysical Research, 86 (B4): 2825–2852, Bibcode:1981JGR....86.2825D, doi:10.1029/JB086iB04p02825, archived from the original (PDF) on May 7, 2019
- Dziewonski, Adam M.; Gilbert, Freeman (1976), "The effect of small aspherical perturbations on travel times and a re-examination of the corrections for ellipticity", Geophysical Journal of the Royal Astronomical Society, vol. 44, no. 1, pp. 7–17, Bibcode:1976GeoJ...44....7D, doi:10.1111/j.1365-246X.1976.tb00271.x.
- Gutenberg, Beno (January 1945a), "Amplitudes of surface Waves and magnitudes of shallow earthquakes" (PDF), Bulletin of the Seismological Society of America, 35 (1): 3–12, Bibcode:1945BuSSA..35....3G, doi:10.1785/BSSA0350010003
- Gutenberg, Beno (April 1945b), "Amplitudes of P, PP, and S and magnitude of shallow earthquakes" (PDF), Bulletin of the Seismological Society of America, 35 (2): 57–69, Bibcode:1945BuSSA..35...57G, doi:10.1785/BSSA0350020057
- Gutenberg, Beno; Richter, Charles F. (April 1956a), "Earthquake magnitude, intensity, energy, and acceleration (Second Paper)" (PDF), Bulletin of the Seismological Society of America, vol. 46, no. 2, pp. 105–145, doi:10.1785/BSSA0460020105
- Gutenberg, Beno; Richter, Charles F. (1956b), "Magnitude and energy of earthquakes", Annali di Geofisica, vol. 9, no. 1, pp. 1–15, Bibcode:1956AnGp....9....1G, doi:10.4401/ag-5590.
- Hanks, Thomas C.; Kanamori, Hiroo (May 10, 1979), "A Moment magnitude scale" (PDF), Journal of Geophysical Research, 84 (B5): 2348–2350, Bibcode:1979JGR....84.2348H, doi:10.1029/JB084iB05p02348, archived from the original on August 21, 2010.
- Honda, Hirokichi (1962), "Earthquake Mechanism and Seismic Waves", Journal of Physics of the Earth, 10 (2): 1–98, Bibcode:1962JPE....10....1H, doi:10.4294/jpe1952.10.2_1.
- International Seismological Centre, ISC-EHB Bulletin, Thatcham, United Kingdom
- Julian, Bruce R.; Miller, Angus D.; Foulger, G. R. (November 1998), "Non-Double-Couple Earthquakes 1. Theory", Reviews of Geophysics, 36 (4): 525–549, Bibcode:1998RvGeo..36..525J, doi:10.1029/98rg00716.
- Kanamori, Hiroo (July 10, 1977), "The energy release in great earthquakes" (PDF), Journal of Geophysical Research, 82 (20): 2981–2987, Bibcode:1977JGR....82.2981K, doi:10.1029/jb082i020p02981.
- Kanamori, Hiroo (February 2, 1978), "Quantification of Earthquakes" (PDF), Nature, 271 (5644): 411–414, Bibcode:1978Natur.271..411K, doi:10.1038/271411a0, S2CID 4185100.
- Kanamori, Hiroo; Anderson, Don L. (October 1975), "Theoretical basis of some empirical relations in seismology" (PDF), Bulletin of the Seismological Society of America, vol. 65, no. 5, pp. 1073–1095.
- Kassaras, Ioannis G.; Kapetanidis, Vasilis (2018), "Resolving the Tectonic Stress by the Inversion of Earthquake Focal Mechanisms. Application in the Region of Greece. A Tutorial", in D'Amico, Sebastiano (ed.), Moment Tensor Solutions: A Useful Tool for Seismotectonics, Springer Natural Hazards, pp. 405–452, doi:10.1007/978-3-319-77359-9_19, ISBN 978-3-319-77358-2.
- Kostrov, B. V. (1974), "Seismic moment and energy of earthquakes, and seismic flow of rock [in Russian]", Izvestiya, Akademi Nauk, USSR, Physics of the Solid Earth, vol. 1, pp. 23–44 (English Trans. 12–21).
- Maruyama, Takuo (January 1963), "On the force equivalents of dynamical elastic dislocations with reference to the earthquake mechanism", Bulletin of the Earthquake Research Institute, vol. 41, pp. 467–486.
- Miyake, Teru (October–December 2017), "Magnitude, moment, and measurement: The seismic mechanism controversy and its resolution", Studies in History and Philosophy of Science, 65–66: 112–120, Bibcode:2017SHPSA..65..112M, doi:10.1016/j.shpsa.2017.02.002, hdl:10220/44522, PMID 29195644.
- Pujol, Josè (March–April 2003b), "The Body Force Equivalent to an Earthquake: A Tutorial", Seismological Research Letters, 74 (2): 163–168, Bibcode:2003SeiRL..74..163P, doi:10.1785/gssrl.74.2.163.
- Richter, Charles F. (January 1935), "An Instrumental Earthquake Magnitude Scale" (PDF), Bulletin of the Seismological Society of America, 25 (1): 1–32, Bibcode:1935BuSSA..25....1R, doi:10.1785/BSSA0250010001, archived from the original (PDF) on 2018-07-10.
- Richter, Charles F. (1958), Elementary Seismology, W. H. Freeman, ISBN 978-0-7167-0211-5, LCCN 58-5970
- Stauder, William (1962), "The Focal Mechanisms of Earthquakes", in Landsberg, H. E.; Van Mieghem, J. (eds.), Advances in Geophysics, vol. 9, pp. 1–76, doi:10.1016/S0065-2687(08)60527-0, ISBN 978-0-12-018809-3, LCCN 52-1226.
- Steketee, J.A. (1958a), "On Volterra's dislocations in a semi-infinite elastic medium", Canadian Journal of Physics, 36 (2): 192–205, Bibcode:1958CaJPh..36..192S, doi:10.1139/p58-024.
- Steketee, J.A. (1958b), "Some geophysical applications of the elasticity theory of dislocations", Canadian Journal of Physics, 36 (9): 1168–1198, Bibcode:1958CaJPh..36.1168S, doi:10.1139/p58-123.
- Suzuki, Yasumoto (June 2001), "Kiyoo Wadati and the path to the discovery of the intermediate-deep earthquake zone", Episodes, 24 (2): 118–123, doi:10.18814/epiiugs/2001/v24i2/006.
- "Technical Terms used on Event Pages", United States Geological Survey, n.d., archived from the original on 15 August 2017.
- Thatcher, Wayne; Hanks, Thomas C. (December 10, 1973), "Source parameters of southern California earthquakes", Journal of Geophysical Research, 78 (35): 8547–8576, Bibcode:1973JGR....78.8547T, doi:10.1029/JB078i035p08547.
- Tsuboi, S.; Abe, K.; Takano, K.; Yamanaka, Y. (April 1995), "Rapid Determination of M_{w} from Broadband P Waveforms", Bulletin of the Seismological Society of America, vol. 85, no. 2, pp. 606–613.
- Udías, Agustín (1991), "Source Mechanism of Earthquakes", Advances in Geophysics Volume 33, vol. 33, pp. 81–140, Bibcode:1991AdGeo..33...81U, doi:10.1016/S0065-2687(08)60441-0, ISBN 978-0-12-018833-8.
- Utsu, T. (2002), Lee, W.H.K.; Kanamori, H.; Jennings, P.C.; Kisslinger, C. (eds.), "Relationships between magnitude scales", International Handbook of Earthquake and Engineering Seismology, International Geophysics, vol. A, no. 81, Academic Press, pp. 733–746.
- Venkataraman, Anupama; Kanamori, H. (11 May 2004), "Observational constraints on the fracture energy of subduction zone earthquakes" (PDF), Journal of Geophysical Research, vol. 109, no. B05302, pp. B05302, Bibcode:2004JGRB..109.5302V, doi:10.1029/2003JB002549.
- Das, Ranjit; Menesis, Claudio; Urrutia, Diego (2023-05-15). "Regression relationships for conversion of body wave and surface wave magnitudes toward Das magnitude scale, Mwg". Natural Hazards. 117 (1): 365–380. Bibcode:2023NatHa.117..365D. doi:10.1007/s11069-023-05863-9. ISSN 0921-030X. This article incorporates text from this source, which is available under the CC BY 4.0 license.
- Das, Ranjit; Sharma, M. L.; Wason, H. R.; Choudhury, D.; Gonzalez, G. (August 2019). "A seismic moment magnitude scale". Bulletin of the Seismological Society of America. 109 (4): 1542–1555. Bibcode:2019BuSSA.109.1542D. doi:10.1785/0120180327. ISSN 0037-1106.
