= Seismic moment =

Physical quantity

Seismic moment is a quantity used by seismologists to measure the size of an earthquake. The scalar seismic moment $M_0$ is defined by the equation $M_0=\mu AD$, where

- $\mu$ is the shear modulus of the rocks involved in the earthquake (in pascals (Pa), i.e. newtons per square meter)
- $A$ is the area of the rupture along the geologic fault where the earthquake occurred (in square meters), and
- $D$ is the average slip (displacement offset between the two sides of the fault) on $A$ (in meters).

$M_0$ thus has dimensions of torque, measured in newton meters. The connection between seismic moment and a torque is natural in the body-force equivalent representation of seismic sources as a double-couple (a pair of force couples with opposite torques): the seismic moment is the torque of each of the two couples. Despite having the same dimensions as energy, seismic moment is not a measure of energy. The relations between seismic moment, potential energy drop and radiated energy are indirect and approximative.

The seismic moment of an earthquake is typically estimated using whatever information is available to constrain its factors. For modern earthquakes, moment is usually estimated from ground motion recordings of earthquakes known as seismograms. For earthquakes that occurred in times before modern instruments were available, moment may be estimated from geologic estimates of the size of the fault rupture and the slip.

Seismic moment is the basis of the moment magnitude scale introduced by the United States Geological Survey's Thomas C. Hanks and Caltech's Hiroo Kanamori, which is often used to compare the size of different earthquakes and is especially useful for comparing the sizes of large (great) earthquakes.

The seismic moment is not restricted to earthquakes. For a more general seismic source described by a seismic moment tensor $M_{ij}$ (a symmetric tensor, but not necessarily a double couple tensor), the seismic moment is

$$M_0=\frac{1}{\sqrt{2}} (M_{ij}^2)^{1/2}$$

== See also ==
- Richter scale
- Moment magnitude scale

== Sources ==
- Aki, Keiiti (1966), "Generation and propagation of G waves from the Niigata earthquake of June 14, 1964. Part 2. Estimation of earthquake moment, released energy and stress-strain drop from G wave spectrum" (PDF), Bulletin of the Earthquake Research Institute, 44: 73–88.
- Aki, Keiiti; Richards, Paul G. (2002), Quantitative seismology (2 ed.), University Science Books, ISBN 0-935702-96-2.
- Fowler, C. M. R. (1990), The Solid Earth, Cambridge, UK: Cambridge University Press, ISBN 0-521-38590-3.
- Udías, Agustín (1991), "Source Mechanism of Earthquakes", Advances in Geophysics, vol. 33, pp. 81–140, Bibcode:1991AdGeo..33...81U, doi:10.1016/S0065-2687(08)60441-0, ISBN 9780120188338.
