= Magnitude of completeness =

In an earthquake catalog, the magnitude of completeness (Mc) is the minimum magnitude above which all earthquakes within a certain region are reliably recorded. For example, if the Mc of a catalog for a specific region is 2.6 from 1980 to the present, this means that all earthquakes above a magnitude 2.6 have been recorded in the catalog from 1980 to the present time. When interpreting this data, a Mc too high may mean under-sampling, whereas a value too low could indicate an erroneous seismicity parameter.

Another definition includes, 'the lowest magnitude at which 100% of the earthquakes in a space-time volume are detected.'
