= Masayuki Kikuchi =

Japanese seismologist (1948–2003)

Masayuki Kikuchi (菊地 正幸; January 19, 1948 – October 18, 2003) was a Japanese seismologist. He was famous for real-time seismology.

== Education and career ==
Bachelor of Science (1970), Master of Science (1972), and Doctor of Science (1976), in Geophysics, University of Tokyo.

Kikuchi dropped out of the Graduate School of Sciences, Tokyo University, 1973. In the same year, he took an assistant professorship at Yokohama City University. In 1976, he earned his doctorate in science. He was promoted to associate professor in 1983 and to professor in 1988.

Kikuchi returned to Tokyo University in 1996 and became the Director of the seismic prognosis information center at the Earthquake Research Institute, University of Tokyo.

== Scientific contributions ==
(1) Computer simulation for dynamic rupture propagation. The specific fracture energy associated with large earthquakes was estimated to be much larger, by 5-6 of the order of magnitude, than that of the ordinary solid material in laboratory.

(2) Source rupture processes. Waveform inversion technique was developed in an attempt to extract the information of detailed source rupture processes. Heterogeneous fault slip distributions were determined for many large earthquakes. These are now being compiled into a fault asperity map in the world.

(3) Effect of multiple scatterings on the attenuation and dispersion of wave propagation. The numerical method to estimate the impulse response was developed and applied to laboratory data.

Kikuchi simulated the seismic rupture process using computers in the 1970s and 1980s. He invented the method for slip distribution on the fault plane by teleseismic waveform with Hiroo Kanamori. In addition, he analysed significant earthquakes just after occurrence and distributed the results of analysis on the internet. These results were called Kikuchi Solutions.
