= Hiroo Kanamori =

Japanese seismologist

- 金森 博雄
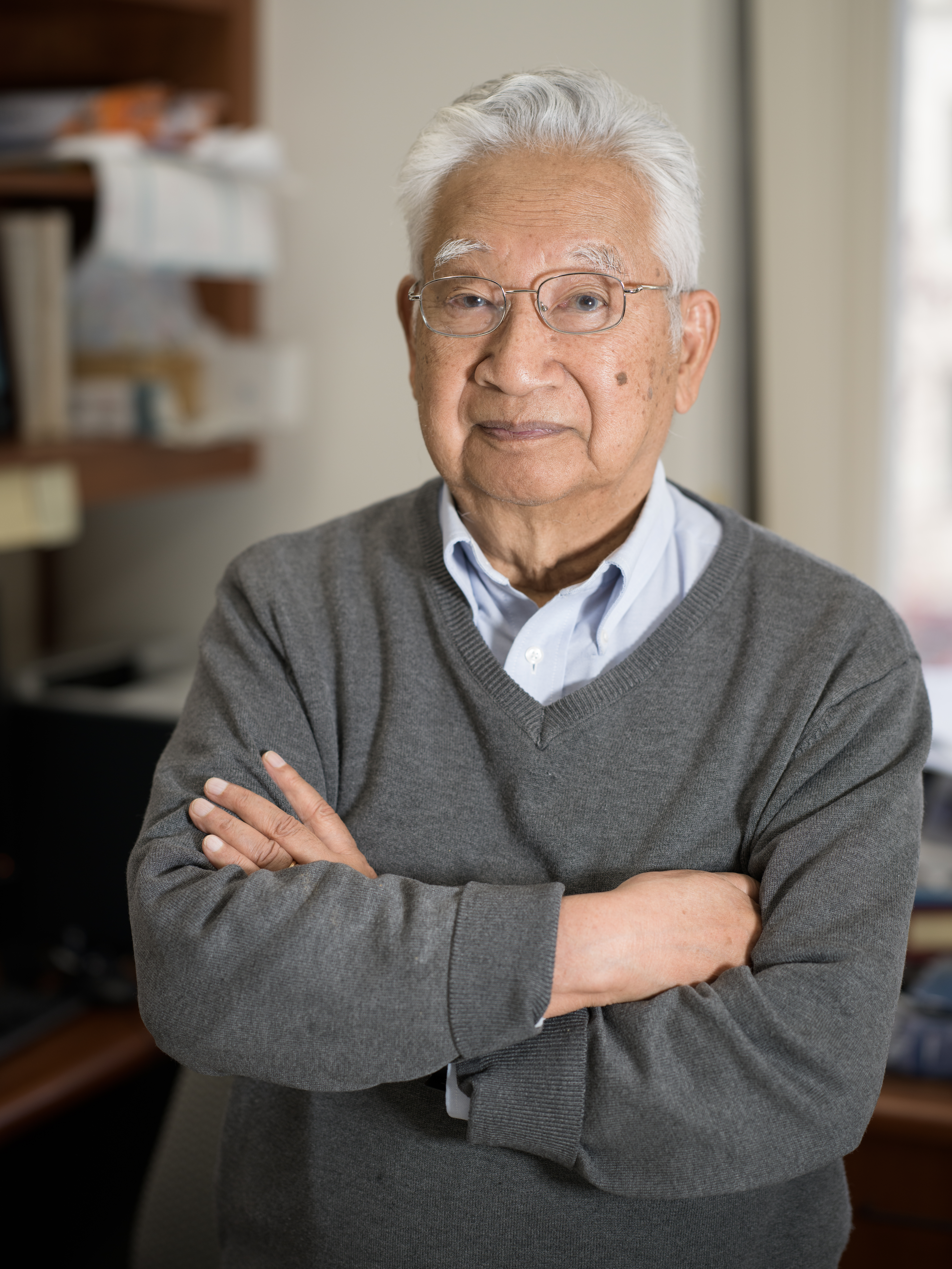
- Born: October 17, 1936 (age 90)
- Education: Tokyo University (M. S., 1961; Ph.D., 1964)
- Known for: Moment magnitude scale
- Awards: Kyoto Prize (2007)
- Scientific career
- Fields: Geophysics
- Workplaces: Research Associate, Geophysics Institute, Tokyo University, 1962–65; Research Fellow, California Institute of Technology, 1965–66; Professor, Earthquake Research Institute, Tokyo University, 1966–72; Professor, California Institute of Technology, 1972-05
- Doctoral students: Seth Stein

Hiroo Kanamori (金森 博雄, Kanamori Hiroo; born October 17, 1936) is a Japanese seismologist who has made fundamental contributions to understanding the physics of earthquakes and the tectonic processes that cause them.

== Career ==
Kanamori and American seismologist Thomas C. Hanks developed the moment magnitude scale which replaced the Richter scale as a measurement of the relative strength of earthquakes.

Kanamori invented the method for calculating slip distribution on the fault plane by teleseismic waveform with Masayuki Kikuchi. In addition, they studied realtime seismology.

In 2007 he was awarded the Kyoto Prize in Basic Sciences.

Kanamori developed a new method of earthquake early warning detection by rapid analysis of the P wave by a robust network. The algorithm is currently being tested with the Southern California Seismic Network "ShakeAlert" Earthquake Early Warning (EEW) system, and is one of three algorithms that is used by the system.

== Honours ==
- 1993 Arthur L. Day Prize and Lectureship
- 1994 Asahi Prize
- 1996 Walter H. Bucher Medal
- 2004 Japan Academy Prize
- 2006 Person of Cultural Merit
- 2007 Kyoto Prize
- 2014 William Bowie Medal

== Selected publications ==
- Kanamori, H. (1977). "The energy release in great earthquakes" (PDF). J. Geophys. Res. 82 (20): 2981–2987. Bibcode:1977JGR....82.2981K. doi:10.1029/JB082i020p02981. Archived from the original (PDF) on 2010-07-23.
- S. Uyeda; H. Kanamori (1979). "Back-arc opening and the mode of subduction" (PDF). Journal of Geophysical Research. 84 (B3): 1049–1061. Bibcode:1979JGR....84.1049U. doi:10.1029/JB084iB03p01049. Archived from the original (PDF) on 2011-06-14.
- Hanks, Thomas C.; Kanamori, Hiroo (May 1979). "Moment magnitude scale" (PDF). Journal of Geophysical Research. 84 (B5): 2348–2350. Bibcode:1979JGR....84.2348H. doi:10.1029/JB084iB05p02348. Archived from the original (PDF) on 2010-08-21.
- L. Ruff; H. Kanamori (1980). "Seismicity and the subduction process" (PDF). Phys. Earth Planet. Inter. 23 (3): 240–252. Bibcode:1980PEPI...23..240R. doi:10.1016/0031-9201(80)90117-X. Archived from the original (PDF) on 2010-07-23.
- Kikuchi, M.; Kanamori, H. (1982). "Inversion of complex body waves" (PDF). Bull. Seismol. Soc. Am. 72: 491–506. Archived from the original (PDF) on 2010-07-23.
- Vassiliou, Marius; Kanamori, Hiroo (1982). "The Energy Release in Earthquakes" (PDF). Bull. Seismol. Soc. Am. 72: 371–387. Archived from the original (PDF) on 2010-07-23.
- Kanamori, H.; Hauksson, E.; Heaton, T. (1997). "Real-time seismology and earthquake hazard mitigation" (PDF). Nature. 390 (6659): 461–464. Bibcode:1997Natur.390..461K. doi:10.1038/37280. S2CID 4412616. Archived from the original (PDF) on 2011-06-14.
- Allen, R.M.; H. Kanamori (2001). "Rapid determination of event source parameters in southern California for earthquake early warning". AGU 2001 Fall Meeting. 2001: S11B–0556. Bibcode:2001AGUFM.S11B0556A.
- Allen RM, Kanamori H (2 May 2003). "The potential for earthquake early warning in southern California" (PDF). Science. 300 (5620): 786–9. Bibcode:2003Sci...300..786A. doi:10.1126/science.1080912. PMID 12730599. S2CID 10922234. Archived from the original (PDF) on 4 June 2010.
- Zollo A, Amoroso O, Lancieri M, Wu Y, Kanamori H (24 July 2010). "A threshold-based earthquake early warning using dense accelerometer networks". Geophysical Journal International. 183 (2): 963–974. Bibcode:2010GeoJI.183..963Z. doi:10.1111/j.1365-246X.2010.04765.x.

== See also ==
- List of geophysicists
