= Thomas C. Hanks =

American seismologist

- Born: Thomas Colgrove Hanks; November 29, 1944; Washington, DC, U.S.
- Died: March 5, 2024 (aged 79); Palo Alto, California, U.S.
- Education: Princeton; California Institute of Technology
- Known for: Moment magnitude scale
- Scientific career
- Fields: Seismology

Thomas Colgrove Hanks (November 29, 1944 – March 5, 2024) was an American seismologist. He worked for the US Geological Survey (USGS) in Menlo Park, California. Dr. Hanks was a member of the Seismological Society of America, the American Geophysical Union, the Earthquake Engineering Research Institute, the Geological Society of America, the Peninsula Geological Society at Stanford, and many related geological societies. Dr. Hanks authored dozens of scholarly papers in strong-motion seismology and tectonic geomorphology.

Hanks was born in Washington DC, the middle of three sons. Hanks graduated with a B.S.E. in geological engineering from Princeton University in 1966 after completing a senior thesis titled "The meaning of a heat flow experiment on Mars." He later received his PhD from the California Institute of Technology in 1972 after completing a dissertation titled "A Contribution to the Determination and Interpretation of Seismic Source Parameters".

In 1979 the Japanese-American seismologist Hiroo Kanamori, professor of seismology at the California Institute of Technology and Dr. Hanks suggested the use of moment magnitude scale to replace the Richter magnitude scale for measuring the relative strength of earthquakes. The reason was that the Richter scale saturates at magnitudes greater than about 5.5, while the Moment magnitude scale does not saturate.

On March 5, 2024, Dr Hanks died from a stroke after battling prostate cancer. A scientific symposium celebrating his life was held by the USGS at the Ames NASA Research Center in October 2024.
