= John August Anderson =

American astronomer

John August Anderson (August 7, 1876 – December 2, 1959) was an American astronomer who made significant contributions to improving astronomical instruments in the early 20th century, especially diffraction gratings.

== Biography ==
John August Anderson was born on August 7, 1876, in Rollag, Minnesota, a small unincorporated community in Clay County. He was the sixth child of Brede Andersen and Elen Martha Brevik .

After completing his early education, Anderson attended Concordia College in Moorhead, Minnesota, from 1891 to 1893. He then pursued further studies at Minnesota State University Moorhead (formerly Moorhead Normal School) from 1893 to 1894. In January 1899, he enrolled at Valparaiso University in Indiana, where he obtained a B.S. degree in August 1900.

Following the completion of his undergraduate degree, Anderson served as a teacher until 1904 when he decided to further his education. He enrolled at Johns Hopkins University, where he pursued graduate studies under the direction of Professor Joseph Sweetman Ames, on the Absorption and Emission Spectra of Neodymium and Erbium Compounds. After receiving his PhD in 1907 he stayed at Johns Hopkins and became a professor of astronomy in 1908. He continued research on absorption and emission spectra and “was requested to take charge of the ruling engine constructed by Henry Rowland, the great American pioneer in spectroscopy. Anderson refined Rowland's machine to produce gratings of even finer resolving power” and continued their production, as high quality diffraction gratings were in high demand during that time.

In 1912 at the request of George E. Hale he took a one year leave of absence from Johns Hopkins to supervise and assist with the construction of a large ruling engine at the Mt. Wilson observatory. In 1913 he returned to Johns Hopkins, but in 1916, he left to work at Mt. Wilson. His most notable contribution was his adaptation of the Michelson's interferometer technique for measuring close double stars. He used a rotating mask at the focus to measure the separation of Capella. In the 1920s, he collaborated with Harry O. Wood to develop the Wood–Anderson seismometer.

In 1928 after the California Institute of Technology received funds for the building of the 200-inch Palomar telescope he was asked by Hale to serve as executive officer of the newly formed Observatory Council, whose charge was to oversee all aspects of the project. Over the next twenty years, Anderson directed and participated in site selection, design and testing of the 200-inch mirror, the establishment and operation of an on-site optical shop, and the design and testing of the telescope structure and, especially, its instrumentation. Anderson remained head of the Observatory Council up to the time of the telescope's dedication, in June 1948.

He died on December 2, 1959, at the age of 83 in Altadena, California. The crater Anderson on the Moon is named in his memory.

He was awarded the Franklin Institute's Howard N. Potts Medal in 1924.

== Bibliography ==
Unless otherwise noted, the following publications were by John A. Anderson.

- "On the Application of the Laws of Refraction in Interpreting Solar Phenomena", Astrophysical Journal, vol. 31, 1910.
- "A method of investigating the Stark effect for metals, with results for chromium", 1917.
- "The vacuum spark spectrum of calcium", 1924.
- "The Use of Long Focus Concave Gratings at Eclipses", Publications of the Astronomical Society of the Pacific, Vol. 38, 1926.
- J. A. Anderson and Russell W. Porter, "Ronchi's Method of Optical Testing", Astrophysical Journal, vol. 70, 1929.
- "Spectral energy-distribution of the high-current vacuum tube", 1932.
- "On the application of Michelson's interferometer method to the measurement of close double stars", Astrophysical Journal, vol. 51, June 1920.
- "Optics of the 200-inch Hale Telescope", Publications of the Astronomical Society of the Pacific, Vol. 60, 1948.
