= Harry O. Wood =

American seismologist (1879–1958)

- Born: July 28, 1879; Gardiner, Maine U.S.
- Died: February 5, 1958 (aged 78); Pasadena, California, U.S.
- Education: Harvard University
- Known for: Wood-Anderson seismometer
- Scientific career
- Fields: Seismology
- Workplaces: University of California, Berkeley; Hawaiian Volcano Observatory; California Institute of Technology; Carnegie Institution for Science

Harry Oscar Wood (1879–1958) was an American seismologist who made several significant contributions in the field of seismology in the early twentieth-century. Following the 1906 earthquake in San Francisco, California, Wood expanded his background of geology and mineralogy and his career took a change of direction into the field of seismology. In the 1920s he co-developed the torsion seismometer, a device tuned to detect short-period seismic waves that are associated with local earthquakes. In 1931 Wood, along with another seismologist, redeveloped and updated the Mercalli intensity scale, a seismic intensity scale that is still in use as a primary means of rating an earthquake's effects.

== Career ==
Wood was an instructor of geology and mineralogy at University of California, Berkeley from 1904 through 1912 and during that time taught the first course in seismology in the United States. He left California to operate the seismic station as a research associate at the Hawaiian Volcano Observatory from 1912 to 1917, and while there prepared a report on the necessity for additional earthquake research in Southern California. During World War I he worked at the National Bureau of Standards developing a piezoelectric seismograph that was being tested to locate cannon fire. For the period 1919–1920 he was the acting associate secretary at the United States National Research Council and secretary of the recently established American Geophysical Union. During his time in Washington, D.C., he attracted the interest of the Carnegie Institution for Science and they would eventually employ Wood to establish a small seismic network that would ultimately grow into the Caltech Seismological Laboratory.

Coming from the state of Maine, Wood earned a bachelor's and master's degrees from Harvard University, then arrived in Berkeley in 1904 and began instructing in the University of California's geology department, which was being led by Andrew Lawson. Wood began his transition into seismology following the 1906 San Francisco earthquake when damage investigations were conducted in the city under Lawson's leadership. The state refused to allocate funds for their research for the California State Earthquake Investigation Commission and instead the commission was funded and published by the Carnegie Institution for Science in what would be known as the Lawson report, but no further seismological research was done under that alliance until much later. Wood ultimately endowed two research chairs in seismology at the Carnegie Institution for Science.

=== Wood–Anderson seismometer ===
In 1908, geologist Grove K. Gilbert paid Wood $1,000 to draft a map of potentially active faults in northern California and several years later Lawson assigned Wood to oversee the university's seismometers, where attention was focused on local earthquakes as well as the distant events that were used (especially by European scientists like Beno Gutenberg) to study the attributes of the Earth's interior. Seismometers that were in use up until that time had been developed and optimized for detecting the long-period seismic waves from distant earthquakes and did not detect local events well. Wood left Berkeley in 1912 and spent several years researching volcano seismology in Hawaii and made contact with Arthur L. Day, the director of the Carnegie Institution's geophysical laboratory, while Day also conducted volcanological research there. He would serve as Wood's mentor who took his advice and went to work at the Bureau of Standards in Washington D. C. where a relationship was developed with George Ellery Hale, the director of Carnegie's Mount Wilson Observatory in Pasadena.

In March 1921, the Carnegie Institution accepted a proposal from Wood to provide financing for a long-duration program of seismological research in Southern California. As a researcher for the Institute Wood worked in a partnership with John A. Anderson (an instrument designer and astrophysicist from the Mount Wilson Observatory) to pursue the development of a seismometer that could record the short-period waves from local earthquakes. Their instrument would require the ability to measure the seismic waves with periods from .5–2.0 seconds, which were considerably shorter than what the existing units were able to detect. In September 1923, with the successful completion of what became known as the Wood-Anderson torsion seismometer, the focus became establishing a network of the instruments throughout the region that would be able to pinpoint earthquake epicenters and eventually allow mapping of the corresponding fault zones. Wood suggested that the Carnegie Institute establish a small network of the units at five locations throughout the region (Pasadena, Mount Wilson, Riverside, Santa Catalina Island, and Fallbrook) and the Institute agreed to move forward with the proposal.

=== Caltech Seismological Laboratory ===
The Carnegie Institute sought to cooperate with the California Institute of Technology in Pasadena for their seismic network's central station. Hale put forward the idea that the seismological lab could be integrated into the university's new geology department and soon thereafter the university's president, Robert A. Millikan, officially accepted the proposal and a new building away from the main campus was set up for the station which was eventually called the Caltech Seismological Laboratory. Soon after its founding, Beno Gutenberg, Charles Richter, and Hugo Benioff arrived in Pasadena to help with its formation.

=== Modified Mercalli intensity scale ===
Seismologist Michele Stefano de Rossi and limnologist François-Alphonse Forel had each created their own intensity scales and in 1883 came together to join their efforts and formulate the 10-level Rossi–Forel scale. In 1902, Giuseppe Mercalli updated the scale to include descriptions of how individuals responded to the earthquake, and Adolfo Cancani later proposed extending the scale to 12 levels. The German physicist August Heinrich Sieberg executed the change and called it the Mercalli-Cancani-Sieberg (MCS) scale which became popular in Europe. Wood and seismologist Frank Neumann devised their own 12-level scale in 1931, removed Cancini and Sieberg's names, and called it the Modified Mercalli Intensity Scale. One of the first uses for the new scale was in a report Wood furnished to the Seismological Society of America regarding the effects of the 1933 Long Beach earthquake where its intensity was placed at VIII (Severe).
