= Epicentral distance =

Diagram of the epicenter

Epicentral distance refers to the ground distance from the epicenter to a specified point. Generally, the smaller the epicentral distance of an earthquake of the same scale, the heavier the damage caused by the earthquake. On the contrary, with the increase of epicentral distance, the damage caused by the earthquake is gradually reduced. Due to the limitation of seismometers designed in the early years, some seismic magnitude scales began to show errors when the epicentral distance exceeded a certain range from the observation points. (Note: It is not applicable if the epicentral distance of the near earthquake magnitude at the observation point exceeds about 600 km.) In seismology, the unit of far earthquakes is usually ° (degree), while the unit of near earthquakes is km. (Note: Generally, 1 °=111.1 kilometers.) But regardless of distance, Δ is used as a symbol for the epicentral distance.

== Measuring method ==
=== S-P time difference method ===
Even if the depth of focus of an earthquake is very deep, it can still have a very short epicentral distance. When measuring the epicentral distance of an earthquake with a small epicentral distance, first measure the reading of the initial motion of P wave, and then confirm the arrival of S wave. (Note: The S-wave is the second clear seismic phase on long period horizontal instruments, while it is less obvious on short period vertical instruments.) The value of the epicenter distance Δ is found on the travel timetable according to the arrival time difference between the P wave and S wave.

=== Other Methods ===
If the source is very far away, that is, when the epicenter distance is greater than 105 °, (Note: Or approximately 11666.7 kilometers.) the epicenter distance cannot be determined according to the S-P move out method so it must be determined by P, PKP, PP, SKS, PS, and other waves.

== Correlation with seismic measurement ==
=== Definition of near earthquake magnitude ===
In 1935, in the absence of a mature seismic magnitude scales, two seismologists from the California Institute of Technology, Charles Francis Richter and Bino Gutenberg, designed the Richter magnitude scale to study the earthquakes that occurred in California, USA. (Note: This earthquake measure is also known as the "Richter scale earthquake".) In order to keep the result from being negative, Richter defined an earthquake with a maximum horizontal displacement of 1 μ m (which is also the highest accuracy and precision of the Wood Anderson torsion seismometer) recorded by the seismometer at the observation point at the epicentral distance of 100 km as a magnitude 0 earthquake. According to this definition, if the amplitude of the seismic wave measured by the Wood Anderson torsion seismometer at the epicentral distance of 100 km is 1 mm, then the magnitude is 3. (Note: 103 microns.) Although Richter et al. attempted to make the results non-negative, modern precision seismographs often record earthquakes with negative scales due to the lack of clear upper or lower limits on the magnitude of nearby earthquakes. Moreover, due to the limitation of the Wood Anderson torsion seismometer used in the original design of the Richter scale, if the local earthquake scale ML is greater than 6.8 or the epicentral distance exceeds about 600 km the observation point, it is not applicable.

=== Calculation of surface wave magnitude ===
The epicentral distance is one of the important parameters for calculating surface-wave magnitude. The equation for calculating surface wave magnitude is

$M = \log_{10}\left(\frac{A}{T}\right)_{\text{max}} + \sigma(\Delta).$

In this equation, $A$ represents the maximum particle displacement in the surface wave (sum of two horizontal Euclidean vectors), in micrometers; T represents the corresponding period, in seconds; Δ Is the epicentral distance, in degrees; and $\sigma(\Delta)$ is a gauge function. Generally, the expression for the gauge function is

$\sigma(\Delta) = 1.66\cdot\log_{10}(\Delta) + 3.5 .$

According to GB 17740-1999, two horizontal displacements must be measured at the same time or one-eighth of a period. If two displacements have different cycles, weighted summation must be used.

$T = \frac{T_{N}A_{N} + T_{E}A_{E}}{A_{N} + A_{E}}$

Among them, AN represents the displacement in the north-south direction, in micrometers; AE represents the displacement in the east-west direction, in micrometers; TN represents the period of the corresponding AN, in seconds; TE represents the period corresponding to AE, in seconds.

It can be seen that the seismic surface wave period value selected for different epicentral distances is different. Generally, the cycle values can be selected by referring to the table below.

Different epicentral distance（ Δ) Selected seismic surface wave period (T) value
Δ/°	T/s	Δ/°	T/s	Δ/°	T/s
2	3～6	20	9～14	70	14～22
4	4～7	25	9～16	80	16～22
6	5～8	30	10～16	90	16～22
8	6～9	40	12～18	100	16～25
10	7～10	50	12～20	110	17～25
15	8～12	60	14～20	130	18～25

=== Rapid report of large earthquakes with surface wave magnitude ===
In addition to the calculation of surface wave magnitude (Δ≤15°) body wave attenuation characteristics and better conversion relationship between MB and MS are effective ways to improve the longitude of Body wave magnitude MB rapid report of large earthquakes. This is also a meaningful quantitative work for carrying out research on the measurement of Body wave magnitude MB recorded by short period instrument DD-1 and VGK.

== Correlation with epicenter ==
Schematic diagram of the trilateral measurement method. The specific method for calculating the epicenter is to take three stations as the center of the circle, and draw a circle on the map with the radius of the epicentral distance calculated by each station according to the corresponding proportion. Then, connect the intersection points of each two circles, and the intersection points of the three chords are the obtained epicenters. Then, calculate the longitude and latitude.

Before the 20th century, the method of determining the epicenter was generally the geometric center method. Since the beginning of the 20th century, as the technology of seismometers and other instruments gradually matured, the single station measurement method and network measurement method were born. Compared to the three methods, due to the influence of uneven crustal structure on the propagation of seismic rays, (Note: Especially events that occur within the scope of the seismic network.) the network measurement method has the highest accuracy, while the geometric center method has the lowest accuracy.

=== Geometric center method ===
Before the 20th century, in the absence of instrument records, the epicenter position of earthquakes was determined by the macroscopic epicenter based on the extent of damage, which was the geometric center of the epicenter area (the area near the epicenter where the damage was most severe). Due to the inability to determine the precise range of the polar region, errors were often caused.

=== Single station measurement method ===
Due to the varying propagation speeds of various seismic waves in different regions and depths, those with fast wave speeds or diameters first arrive at the station, followed by other waves, resulting in a time difference. (Note: Direct wave.) The epicentral distance, source depth, and time difference of various recorded waves can be compiled into time distance curves and travel timetables suitable for local use. When an earthquake occurs in a certain place, the analyst can measure the time difference of various waves of the earthquake from the seismogram and calculate the epicentral distance by comparing it with the prepared travel timetable or applying the formula. Subsequently, it is necessary to determine the azimuth angle. (Note: Commonly used P-wave and S-wave.) Transforming the initial motion amplitudes in two horizontal directions into ground motion displacements, the azimuth angle can be determined using a trigonometric function. After the azimuth and epicentral distance are calculated, the epicenter position can be easily found. This method is called the single station measurement method. (Note: Some scholars also refer to it as the "azimuth method")

=== Network measurement method ===
When the epicentral distance is calculated by at least three seismic stations, the location of the epicenter can be determined by trilateral measurement. This method of measuring epicenters through instruments, commonly known as microscopic epicenters, is called network measurement method. (Note: Some scholars also refer to it as the "intersection method" or "geometric method" after further conversion) The specific method is done by drawing a circle on the map with the three stations as the center of the circle and the epicentral distance is calculated with the radius according to the corresponding proportion. Then, the intersection of each two circles is connected, and the intersection points of the three strings are the obtained epicenter. Then, the latitude and longitude are calculated (Geographic coordinate system).

== Others ==
=== Seismic classification ===
Epicentral distance also plays a unique role in earthquake classification. The same earthquake is called differently when observed at different distances, near and far. According to epicentral distance, earthquakes can be divided into three categories:

- Local earthquake: Δ＜100km
- Near earthquake: 100km ≤ Δ ≤ 1000km
- Distant earthquake: Δ＞1000km

=== Seismic phase study ===
The epicentral distance is different, and the seismic phases are reflected in different patterns on the seismic record map due to the combined effects of the source, the source depth, and the propagation of seismic rays. Therefore, with the different epicentral distances, the determination of seismic parameters will be different. Given the epicentral distance from the observation points, it is easier to distinguish complex and different seismic phases, which are generally judged according to the overall situation of seismic records on the record map. The size, distance, and depth of earthquakes have distinct characteristics. The closer the source is, the shorter the duration of the vibration; the farther the source, the longer the duration.
