= Surface-wave magnitude =

Earthquake measurement scale

The surface wave magnitude ($M_s$) scale is one of the magnitude scales used in seismology to describe the size of an earthquake. It is based on measurements of Rayleigh surface waves that travel along the uppermost layers of the Earth. This magnitude scale is related to the local magnitude scale proposed by Charles Francis Richter in 1935, with modifications from both Richter and Beno Gutenberg throughout the 1940s and 1950s. It is currently used in People's Republic of China as a national standard (GB 17740-1999) for categorising earthquakes.

The successful development of the local-magnitude scale encouraged Gutenberg and Richter to develop magnitude scales based on teleseismic observations of earthquakes. Two scales were developed, one based on surface waves, $M_s$, and one on body waves, $M_b$. Surface waves with a period near 20 s generally produce the largest amplitudes on a standard long-period seismograph, and so the amplitude of these waves is used to determine $M_s$, using an equation similar to that used for $M_L$.

— William L. Ellsworth, The San Andreas Fault System, California (USGS Professional Paper 1515), 1990–1991

Recorded magnitudes of earthquakes through the mid 20th century, commonly attributed to Richter, could be either $M_s$ or $M_L$.

== Definition ==
The formula to calculate surface wave magnitude is:

$$M_s = \log_{10}\left(\frac{A}{T}\right)_{\text{max}} + \sigma(\Delta)\,,$$

where A is the maximum particle displacement in surface waves (vector sum of the two horizontal displacements) in μm, T is the corresponding period in s (usually 20 ±2 seconds), Δ is the epicentral distance in °, and

$$\sigma(\Delta) = 1.66\cdot\log_{10}(\Delta) + 3.5\,.$$

Several versions of this equation were derived throughout the 20th century, with minor variations in the constant values. Since the original form of $M_s$ was derived for use with teleseismic waves, namely shallow earthquakes at distances >100 km from the seismic receiver, corrections must be added to the computed value to compensate for epicenters deeper than 50 km or less than 20° from the receiver.

For official use by the Chinese government, the two horizontal displacements must be measured at the same time or within 1/8 of a period; if the two displacements have different periods, a weighted sum must be used:

$$T = \frac{T_{N}A_{N} + T_{E}A_{E}}{A_{N} + A_{E}}\,,$$

where A_{N} is the north–south displacement in μm, A_{E} is the east–west displacement in μm, T_{N} is the period corresponding to A_{N} in s, and T_{E} is the period corresponding to A_{E} in s.

== Other studies ==
Vladimír Tobyáš and Reinhard Mittag proposed to relate surface wave magnitude to local magnitude scale M_{L}, using

$$M_s = -3.2 + 1.45 M_{L}$$

Other formulas include three revised formulae proposed by CHEN Junjie et al.:

$$M_s = \log_{10}\left(\frac{A_\text{max}}{T}\right) + 1.54\cdot \log_{10}(\Delta) + 3.53$$

$$M_s = \log_{10}\left(\frac{A_\text{max}}{T}\right) + 1.73\cdot \log_{10}(\Delta) + 3.27$$

and

$$M_s = \log_{10}\left(\frac{A_\text{max}}{T}\right) - 6.2\cdot \log_{10}(\Delta) + 20.6$$

== See also ==
- Seismic magnitude scales
