= Frank Press =

American geophysicist (1924–2020)

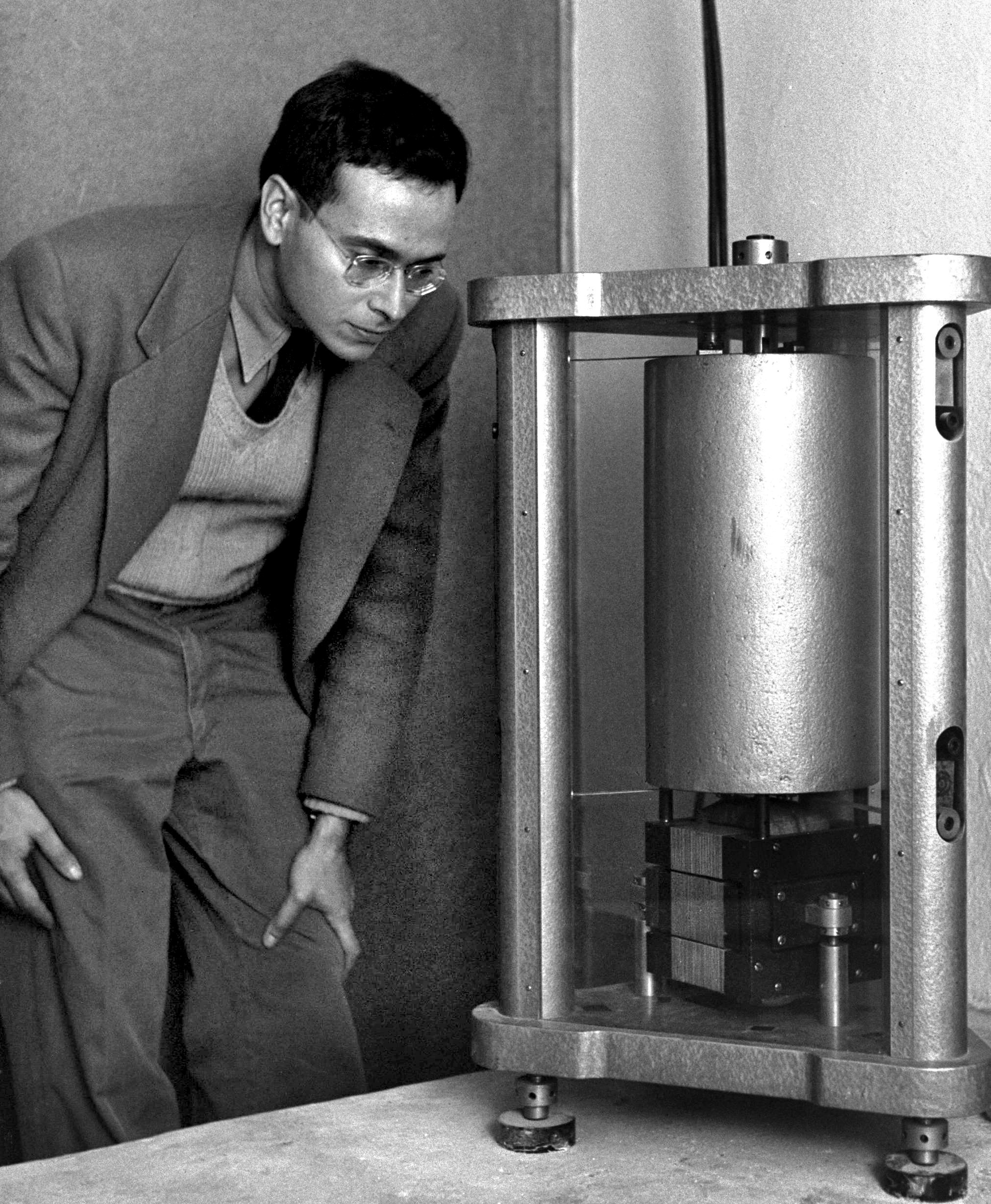
- Press in 1953

19th President of the National Academy of Sciences
- In office 1981–1993
- Preceded by: Philip Handler
- Succeeded by: Bruce Alberts

2nd Director of the Office of Science and Technology Policy
- In office January 20, 1977 – January 20, 1981
- President: Jimmy Carter
- Preceded by: Guyford Stever
- Succeeded by: Benjamin Huberman (Acting)

Personal details
- Born: December 4, 1924 New York City, U.S.
- Died: January 29, 2020 (aged 95) Chapel Hill, North Carolina, U.S.
- Education: City College of New York (BS); Columbia University (MS, PhD)
- Awards: William Bowie Medal (1979); Japan Prize (1993); Vannevar Bush Award (1994); AAAS Philip Hauge Abelson Prize (1994); Lomonosov Gold Medal (1997)
- Scientific career
- Fields: Geophysics
- Workplaces: Columbia University; Lamont–Doherty Earth Observatory; Caltech Seismological Laboratory; Massachusetts Institute of Technology; Office of Science and Technology Policy
- Thesis: Two applications of normal mode sound propagation in the ocean (1949)
- Doctoral advisor: Doc Ewing
- Doctoral students: Don L. Anderson; Charles Archambeau; Ari Ben-Menahem; Donald W. Forsyth

Frank Press (December 4, 1924 – January 29, 2020) was an American geophysicist. He was an advisor to four U.S. presidents, and later served two consecutive terms as president of the U.S. National Academy of Sciences (1981–1993). He was the author of 160 scientific papers and co-author of the textbooks Earth and Understanding Earth.

Press served on the President's Science Advisory Committee during the Kennedy and Johnson administrations, and was appointed by President Richard Nixon to the National Science Board. In 1977 he was appointed President Jimmy Carter's Science Advisor and Director of the Office of Science and Technology Policy, serving until 1981.

== Early life and career ==
Born in Brooklyn, New York, Press graduated from Samuel J. Tilden High School in the same borough. He earned a B.S. from the City College of New York (1944) and completed his M.A. (1946) and Ph.D. (1949) degrees at Columbia University under Maurice "Doc" Ewing. As one of Ewing's two assistant professors, (with J. Lamar "Joe" Worzel as the other) Press was a co-founder of Lamont Geological Observatory (now Lamont–Doherty Earth Observatory) in Palisades, N.Y. Originally trained as an oceanographer, Press participated in research cruises on the sailing vessels RV Vema and RV Atlantis.

In the early 1950s, Press turned to seismology, co-authoring with Ewing and Jardetzky a seminal monograph on elastic waves in layered media. In 1957, Press was recruited by Caltech to succeed founder Beno Gutenberg as director of the Seismological Laboratory, a position in which he remained until 1965. The appointment was controversial in that it passed over both Hugo Benioff and Charles Richter, then the laboratory's senior professors, for a much younger outsider.

Press' accomplishments in this period include the design of a long-period seismograph, and the first detection of the Earth's normal modes of oscillation ("bell ringing"), excited by the Great Chilean earthquake, a pioneering application of digital processing to seismic recordings. Press was also closely involved in the construction of a lunar seismograph, first deployed by the Apollo 11 astronauts (see Lunar seismology).

== Later career ==
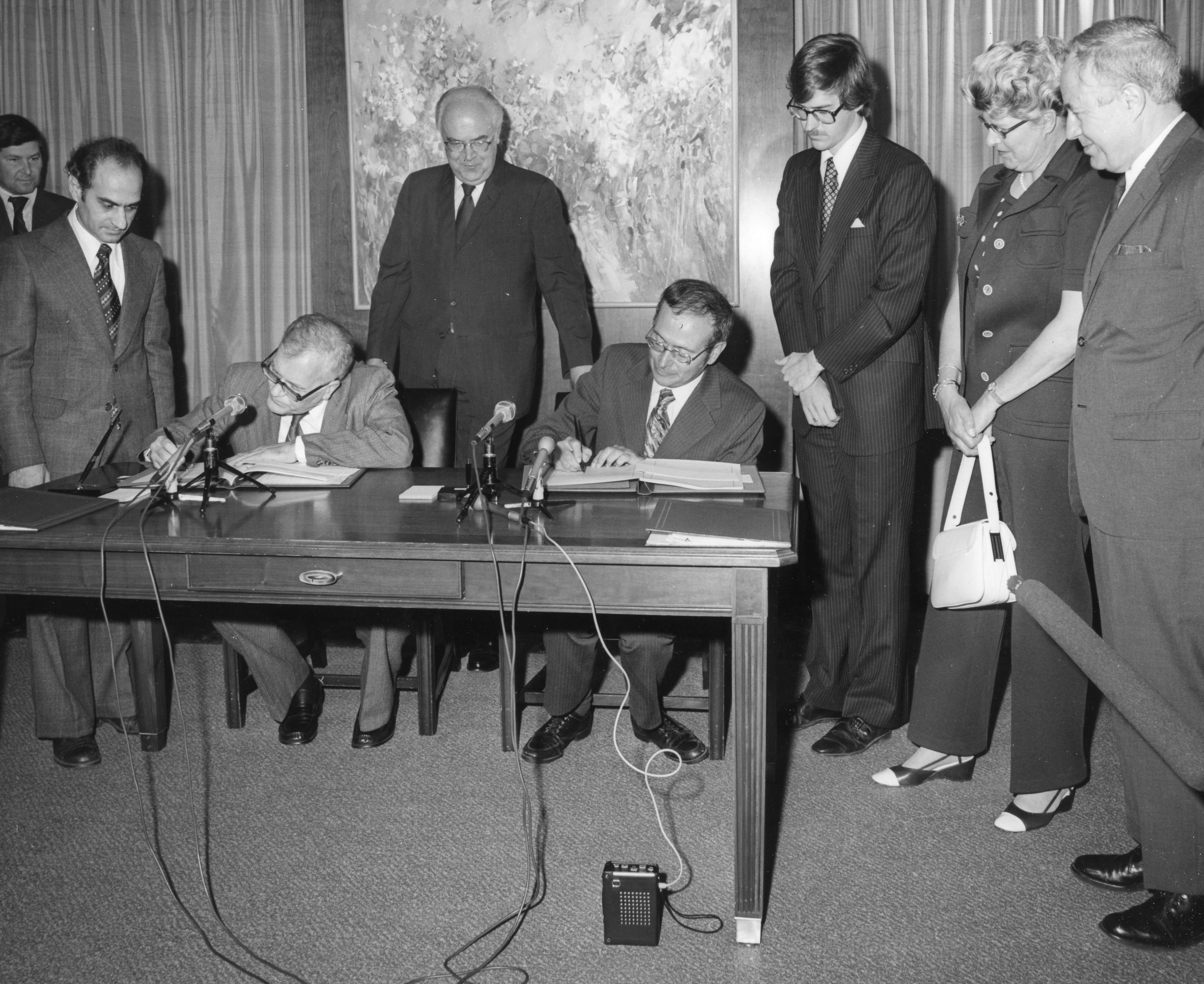
Press and Vladimir Kirillin signing the United States and USSR agreement on cooperation in science and technology

In 1965, Press moved to MIT as department head of Earth and Planetary Sciences, where, with significant support from philanthropist Cecil H. Green, he revitalized what had been an overly traditional geology department by hiring new faculty members. He remained at MIT until 1976, and during this time, his work included collaborations with Vladimir Keilis-Borok and Leon Knopoff on computer pattern matching techniques that could be applied to earthquake prediction.

In 1976, Press became Science Advisor to President Jimmy Carter and director of the Office of Science and Technology Policy. In his capacity, he addressed a memo to the president on fossil fuels and climate change. He played a key role in the formation of the National Committee on Scholarly Communication with the People's Republic of China. In 1978 he led a scientific delegation from the US to China as part of a Carter initiative. In 1981 he was elected president of the U.S. National Academy of Sciences and was re-elected in 1987, serving for a total of 12 years.

In 1996, Press co-founded WAG (the Washington Advisory Group, later known as the Advisory Group at Huron), a global consulting company with clients that included approximately 50 leading universities. WAG played a notable role in the founding of King Abdullah University of Science and Technology (KAUST) in Thuwal, Saudi Arabia. Press chaired that university's international advisory committee until 2010.

Press was the recipient of 30 honorary degrees. Named in his honor are Mount Press, which is in the Ellsworth Mountains, Antarctica; and Osedax frankpressi, a species of whalebone-eating marine worm.

== Personal life ==
Press died on January 29, 2020, at the age of 95. He was the father of physicist William H. Press.

== Notable accomplishments ==
- President of the U.S. National Academy of Sciences (1981–1993)
- Chairman of the National Research Council (1981–1993)
- Science Advisor to the President of the United States, Office of Science and Technology Policy (1977–1981)
- Director, Office of Science and Technology Policy (1977–1981)
- Professor of Geophysics at Massachusetts Institute of Technology and Chairman of the Department of Earth and Planetary Sciences
- Professor of Geophysics at California Institute of Technology and Director of the Caltech Seismological Laboratory
- Life Member of the Corporation of MIT
- Board member of the Rockefeller University, Woods Hole Oceanographic Institution (WHOI), the Marine Biological Laboratory, and the Monterey Bay Aquarium Research Institute
- Member of the advisory council of CRDF Global
- Named three times most influential American scientist in annual surveys by U.S. News & World Report
- Member of the United States National Academy of Sciences
- Member of the American Academy of Arts and Sciences
- Member of the American Philosophical Society

== Awards ==
- U.S. National Medal of Science
- Vannevar Bush Award
- Golden Plate Award of the American Academy of Achievement (1962)
- Gold Medal, Royal Astronomical Society (1971)
- Pupin Medal, Columbia University
- Maurice Ewing Medal of the Society of Exploration Geophysicists (1982)
- Japan Prize from the Emperor of Japan (1993)
- Lomonosov Gold Medal, Russian Academy of Sciences (1997)
- Ordre national de la Légion d'honneur, France
- Pick and Gavel Award, Association of American State Geologists (2007)

== Publications ==
- Press, F. and R. Siever. (2001). Understanding Earth, 3rd edition. W.H. Freeman. LCCN 00-35391 ISBN 0716735040
- Press, F. (1998). The role of geoscientists in providing credible advice to government officials. Abstracts with Programs – Geological Society of America, 30(7): 247.
- Press, F. (1995). Growing up in the Golden Age of Science. Annual Review of Earth and Planetary Sciences, 23: 1–9.
- Press, F. and Allen, C. (1995). Patterns of seismic release in the Southern California region. Journal of Geophysical Research, 100(B4): 6421–6430.
- Press, F. (1995). Needed: Coherent budgeting for science and technology. Science, 270(5241): 1448–1450.
- Press, F. (1994). The restructuring of science in research universities in the post-industrial society. Abstracts with Programs – Geological Society of America, 26(7): 154.
- Press, F. (1991). Geoscience education as viewed from the National Academy of Sciences. Journal of Geological Education, 39(2): 98–100.
- Press, F. (1991). Science and the public welfare. Earthquakes and Volcanoes, 22(3): 93.
- Press, F. (1990). The role of education in technological competitiveness. International Journal of Continuing Engineering Education and Life Long Learning, 1(4): 311–318. doi:10.1504/IJCEELL.1991.030366.
- Press, F. (1988). An international decade for natural disaster reduction. USGS Open-File Report No. 88-0361, pp. 53–61.
- Press, F. and R. Siever. (1986). Earth. W.H. Freeman.
- Press, F. (1984). Science and creationism. Geotimes, 29(5): 9.
- Press, F. (1981). Science and technology in the White House, 1977 to 1980; Part 1. Science, 211(4478): 139–145.
- Press, F. (1981). Science and technology in the White House, 1977 to 1980; Part 2. Science, 211(4479): 249–256.
- Press, F. (1975.) Earthquake Prediction. Scientific American, 232(5): 14–23.
- Press, F. (1974). Structure of the Earth and Moon: A Comparison. Eos, Transactions, American Geophysical Union, 55(4): 323.
- Press, F. (1972). The Earth and the Moon. Transactions of the New York Academy of Sciences, 34(8): 732.
- Press, F. and D.T. Griggs. (1959). Probing the earth with nuclear explosions. Rand Corporation. Issued by the Lawrence Berkeley National Laboratory as UCRL-6013.
- Press, F. (1949).Two applications of normal mode sound propagation in the ocean, Columbia University Ph.D.; ProQuest 301814723; OCLC 6364305.

== Notes ==
Government offices
Preceded by Guyford Stever	Director of the Office of Science and Technology Policy; 1977–1981	Succeeded by Benjamin Huberman; Acting
Professional and academic associations
Preceded by Philip Handler	President of the National Academy of Sciences; 1981–1993	Succeeded by Bruce Alberts
