= Ari Ben-Menahem =

Israeli scientist (1928–2026)

- ארי בן-מנחם
- Born: 4 November 1928; Berlin, Brandenburg, Prussia, Germany
- Died: 9 April 2026 (aged 97)
- Education: Hebrew University of Jerusalem
- Scientific career
- Fields: Mathematics
- Workplaces: Weizmann Institute of Science
- Doctoral advisor: Frank Press; Hugo Benioff

Ari Ben-Menahem (Schlanger) (Hebrew: ארי בן-מנחם; 4 November 1928 – 9 April 2026) was an Israeli scientist who was professor of mathematics and geophysics at the Weizmann Institute of Science from 1964 and visiting professor at MIT. He was a seismologist, author, polymath and historian of science. Ben-Menahem coauthored with Sarvajit Singh, "Seismic Waves and Sources: the mathematical theory of seismology", a pioneering treatise since the nascence of this discipline at the turn of the 20th century.

== Early life and education ==
Ben-Menahem was born in Berlin, Brandenburg, Prussia, Germany on 4 November 1928. He received his master's degree in physics in 1954 from the Hebrew University of Jerusalem and his doctoral degree from the California Institute of Technology (CIT) in 1961. He did his post-doctoral research at CIT, where he worked with Hugo Benioff and Frank Press (1962–1965).

In his doctoral thesis he pioneered the birth of modern seismic-source elastodynamics based on his theory of wave radiation from a finite rupturing fault with subshear or supershear velocity. His theory was confirmed through the observed asymmetric radiation of long-period surface-waves from the great Chilean earthquake of 22 May 1960, where he introduced the fundamental concepts of 'Directivity' and 'Potency' from which the moment tensor is derived. Since then, rupturing fault length, rupture velocity, moment-magnitude and moment energy are routinely calculable from spectra of recorded seismic waves-forms.

== Career ==
In 1975, Ben-Menahem used seismic and barometric recording of the Tunguska event of 30 June 1908, to derive the height and energy of the explosion, demonstrating for the first time a feasible non-cometary mechanism of this extraterrestrial bolide encounter with earth.

Ben-Menahem was the sole author of a 6-volume, 6000 pages treatise: Historical Encyclopedia of Natural and Mathematical Sciences published in 2009 by Springer Verlag.

== Death ==
Ben-Menahem died on 9 April 2026, at the age of 97, and was buried on 12 April.

== Selected publications ==
- Seismic Waves and Sources, Springer Verlag N.Y 1981, 1108 pp.
- Seismic Waves and Sources, 2nd edition, Dover Publications, NY, 2000
- Vincint Veritas – A portrait of the life and work of N.A Haskell, Am. Geoph. Union, Washington D.C 209pp, 1990
- Ari, Ben-Menahem (2009), Historical Encyclopedia of Natural and Mathematical Sciences, vol. 1, New York: Springer Verlag, Bibcode:2009henm.book.....B, ISBN 978-3-540-68831-0
