= Archambeau =

Archambeau is a surname. Notable people with this surname include:

- Charles Archambeau (1933–2020), American geophysicist
- Lester Archambeau (born 1967), American former football player
- Robert Archambeau (1933–2022), Canadian ceramic artist and potter
- Robert Archambeau (writer) (born 1968), novelist and poet
- Shellye Archambeau, American businesswoman
