= Caltech Seismological Laboratory =

- Station code: PAS
- Location: 34.1484°N 118.1711°W
- Elevation: 257 metres (843 ft)
- Network: TERRAscope Seismograph Network
- Source: doi:10.31905/EL3FQQ40

The Caltech Seismological Laboratory is an arm of the Division of Geological and Planetary Sciences of the California Institute of Technology. Known as "the Seismo Lab", it has been a world center for seismology research since the 1920s, and was for many decades a go-to source for rapid (and quotable) commentary to the press on large earthquakes.

The Seismo Lab was established under the auspices of the Carnegie Institution of Washington in 1921 under leadership of Harry O. Wood. By 1926 it had become a cooperative venture between Carnegie and Caltech. In 1937 it was formally transferred in full to Caltech.

Requiring accessible bedrock on which to place seismometers, the Seismo Lab could not originally be located on the Caltech campus, which is on alluvium. Instead, its first two homes were in Pasadena's Linda Vista neighborhood, a granitic outcropping. Its first home, at 220 N. San Rafael Avenue, was a modest two-story laboratory building (later known as "Charles Richter Laboratory"). By 1958 it had outgrown the site and expanded to an adjacent property at 295 N. San Rafael, into what had been an 11000 sq ft (1020 sq m) mansion, complete with marble staircases, 9 bedrooms with connecting baths, and gardens. The horizontal tunnel in which seismometers were installed was a former passageway (with private elevator) between the mansion and the lower tennis courts.

By 1974 it had become possible to transmit seismic signals electronically from remote seismometers, and the Seismo Lab was then relocated to the Caltech campus, becoming over time more integrated into, and less distinct from, the Caltech Division in which it is administratively situated.

== Directors ==
- Harry O. Wood (1921–1946)
- Beno Gutenberg (1946–1957)
- Frank Press (1957–1965)
- Don L. Anderson (1967–1989)
- Hiroo Kanamori (1990–1998)
- Don Helmberger (1998–2003)
- Jeroen Tromp (2003–2008)
- Michael Gurnis (2009– )

== Notable faculty ==
- John P. Buwalda
- Hugo Benioff
- Charles Richter
