= Linda Vista =

Linda Vista may refer to:

- Linda Vista Community Hospital, Los Angeles, California, United States
- Linda Vista, Pasadena, California, United States
- Linda Vista, San Diego, California, United States
- Linda Vista, Tlacotalpan, Veracruz, Mexico
- The original name of Palisades Park in Santa Monica, California
- Linda Vista (play), a 2017 play by Tracy Letts
