= Linda Vista, Pasadena, California =

Coordinates: 34.1697°N 118.1776°W

Linda Vista is a neighborhood in Pasadena, California. It is one of Pasadena's wealthiest neighborhoods, and its largest by area. It is bordered by Oak Grove Drive to the north, Colorado Boulevard to the south, the Pasadena-Glendale border to the west, and Linda Vista Avenue to the east.

== History ==
The district of Linda Vista was courted for annexation to what became La Cañada Flintridge by Frank Flint. Linda Vista Avenue was originally named Parke Avenue. Pasadena was incorporated in 1886; Linda Vista was one of the sections annexed to the city in later days, along with places like Annandale, Lamanda Park, Pasadena Heights, Avandale, San Rafael, and Cheviotsville. It was known as a "picturesque, hilly" neighborhood and was the site of estate-size residential properties.

=== Linda Vista Park ===
Photograph of an area of Linda Vista Park in October 2026

In 2026, the Pasadena School Board authorized negotiations for the redevelopment of Linda Vista Park, located on the site of the former Linda Vista Elementary School.

== Landmarks ==
Linda Vista is built on a slope between the Arroyo Seco and the San Rafael Hills, and is home to the Annandale Golf Club and Art Center College of Design. The Holly Street/Linda Vista Bridge was constructed in 1925 and is recognized for its "ornate concrete railing" and "antique lighting".

== Education ==
Linda Vista is served by San Rafael Elementary School, Eliot Middle School, and Muir High School. Flintridge Sacred Heart Academy, Chandler School, Mayfield Grammar School, Mayfield Senior School, Maranatha High School, Westridge School, and Polytechnic School are private schools in the area.

== Transportation ==
Linda Vista is served by Metro Local lines 180 and 256. The neighborhood is also served by Pasadena Transit routes 51 and 52.

== Government ==
Linda Vista is part of City Council District 6, represented by Steve Madison.

== Notable residents ==
The sculptor Alexander Calder lived on Linda Vista Avenue in the early 1900s.
