= Annandale Line =

Annandale

Overview
- Owner: Southern Pacific Railroad
- Locale: Southern California
- Termini: Pacific Electric Building; Annandale, Pasadena, California
- Stations: 8

Service
- Type: Interurban
- System: Pacific Electric
- Operator(s): Pacific Electric
- Rolling stock: Birney 300 Class (last used)

History
- Opened: 1902
- Closed: April 3, 1928

Technical
- Number of tracks: 1–2
- Track gauge: 4 ft 8 1/2 in (1,435 mm) standard gauge
- Electrification: Overhead line, 600 V DC

The Annandale Line was an interurban route operated by the Pacific Electric Railway from 1902 to 1928.

== Route ==
The line ran from the Pacific Electric Building at 6th and Main streets in Downtown Los Angeles to its terminus at the intersection of Avenue 64 and Cheviotdale in the town of Annandale (later annexed by Pasadena). It split from the South Pasadena Local line at Roble Avenue and Avenue 64.

There was an early plan to extend the line to Downtown Pasadena by way of West California Boulevard (where a local line was already running). Connections between Los Angeles and Pasadena were limited by topography, and the three existing lines were all very heavily used.

== History ==
Through service to Downtown Los Angeles was discontinued on May 5, 1911, and the line became a shuttle service between Avenue 64 and Annandale. After November 13, 1926, Pacific Electric records show that service north of Adelaide Place was abandoned, and any passenger service after was likely run to satisfy franchise requirements. The line north of the South Pasadena Local was formally abandoned on April 3, 1928.
