= Poppy Peak Historic District =

Historic district in California, United States

- U.S. National Register of Historic Places
- U.S. Historic district
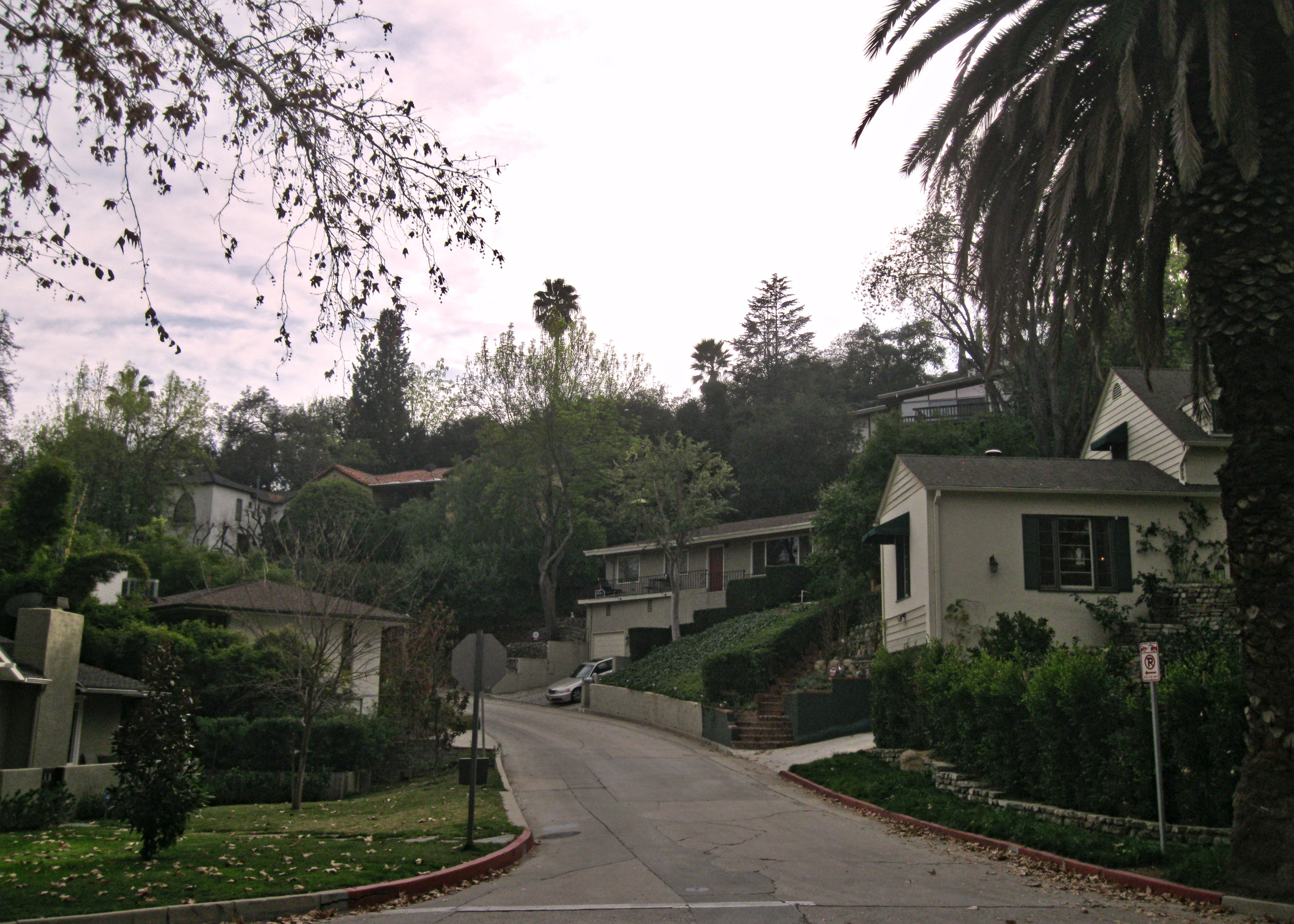
- Poppy Peak Drive at the base of Poppy Peak

- Location within the Los Angeles metropolitan area Location within California Location within the United States
- Location: Repetto Hills, Pasadena, California
- Coordinates: 34°7′56″N 118°10′52″W
- Area: 12.3 acres (5.0 ha)
- Architectural style: Modern Movement
- MPS: Cultural Resources of the Recent Past, City of Pasadena
- NRHP reference No.: 09000182
- Added to NRHP: December 23, 2009

The Poppy Peak Historic District is a neighborhood and historic district located in the southwest corner of Pasadena, California. The neighborhood is located on the side of Poppy Peak, a 991-foot-high (302 m) mountain of the Repetto Hills. Developer William Carr platted the neighborhood in 1924. The homes in the district were designed by a number of significant Modern Movement architects. The district was added to the National Register of Historic Places in 2009.

== Description ==
The Poppy Peak District is located in the southwestern corner of Pasadena in the Annandale neighborhood and borders the Los Angeles neighborhoods of Eagle Rock and Highland Park. The district is roughly enclosed by La Loma Road to the north, Avenue 64 to the east, Poppy Peak Drive to the south, and the Pasadena city limits to the west.

The four main streets through the district are Poppy Peak Drive, Kaweah Drive, Pleasant Way, and Cresthaven Drive. The district is accessed via Poppy Peak Drive, which intersects La Loma Road at the foot of the mountain and connects the other three streets. The streets are steep, narrow, and winding; as a result, the neighborhood has no sidewalks and few front lawns.

The district includes 45 residential properties. 30 of these are Modernist homes which are considered contributing to the district's historical significance, while the remainder are either newer buildings, empty lots, or representative of other styles.

== History ==
Poppy Peak was named by early settlers for the California poppies which grew on the mountainside. The Tongva people lived on and near the mountain prior to late 18th century Spanish colonization in the region. After the Mexican Rancho La Cañada displaced the tribe, no residential development took place on the mountain until the 20th century.

In 1924, developer William Carr purchased the mountain and platted it into residential lots; Carr himself built a house at 1516 Poppy Peak Drive. The first Modernist homes in the district were built in the 1930s; the majority were built in the 1940s and 1950s, while the latest contributing house was constructed in 1968. As of 2008, only two homes have been added to the district since the 1960s.

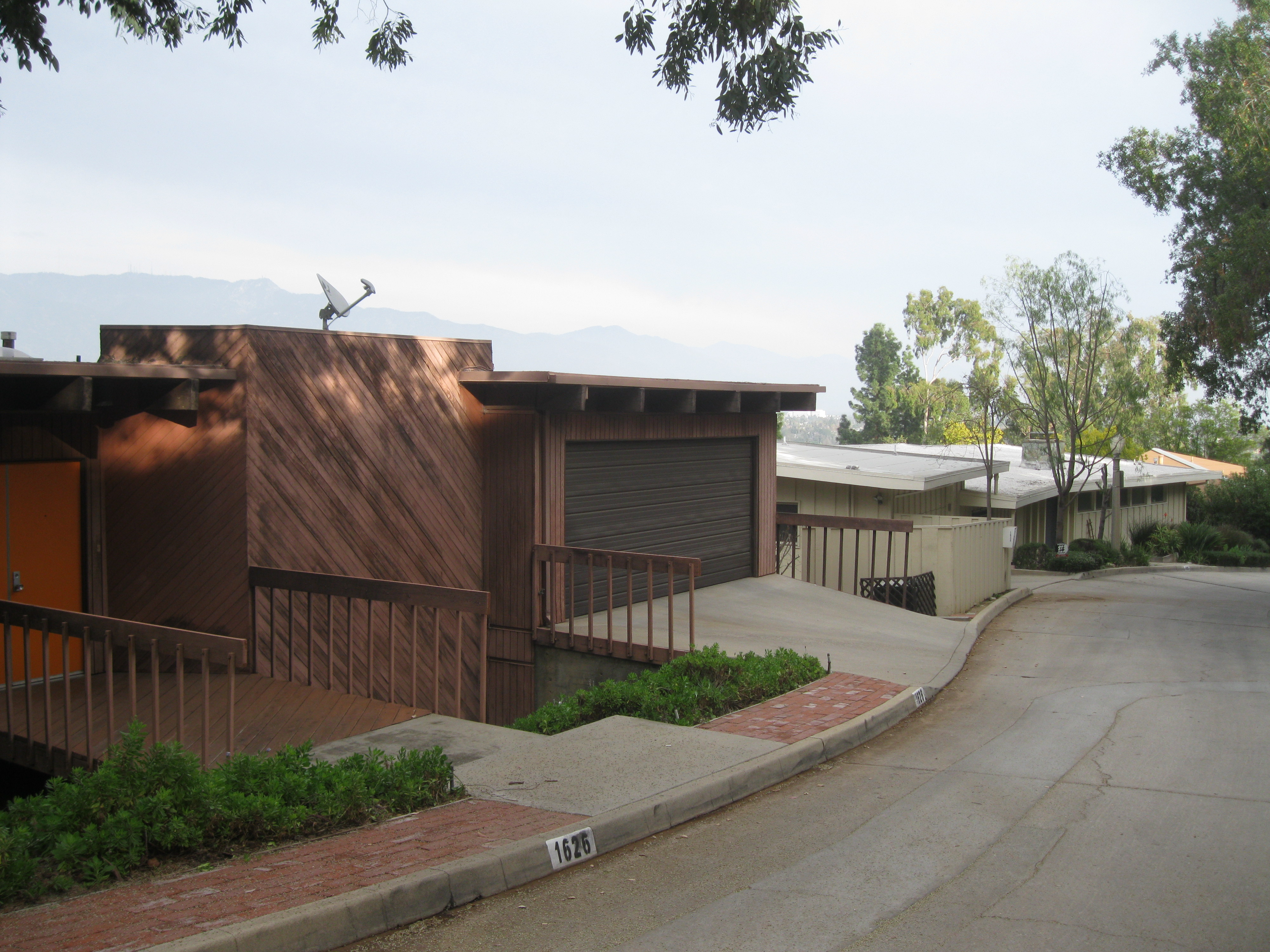
1626 and 1630 Poppy Peak Drive, the latter a contributing property to the historic district

== Architecture ==
The thirty Modern Movement houses in the district were designed by a variety of prominent architects. Richard Neutra designed the house at 1540 Poppy Peak Drive, a post and beam house which features a characteristic "spider leg" beam extending past its south side. Two 1930s designs by Harwell Hamilton Harris are located at 1642 Pleasant Way and 1444 Poppy Peak Drive; the latter house was moved to the district in 1951 by architect Leland Evison. Several architects associated with the University of Southern California School of Architecture designed houses in the district, including James Pulliam, the three partners of Buff, Straub and Hensman, Lyman Ennis, Kenneth Nishimoto, and the aforementioned Leland Evison.

== See also ==
- National Register of Historic Places listings in Pasadena, California
- Modernist architecture in California
