= Lamanda Park Line =

Lamanda Park
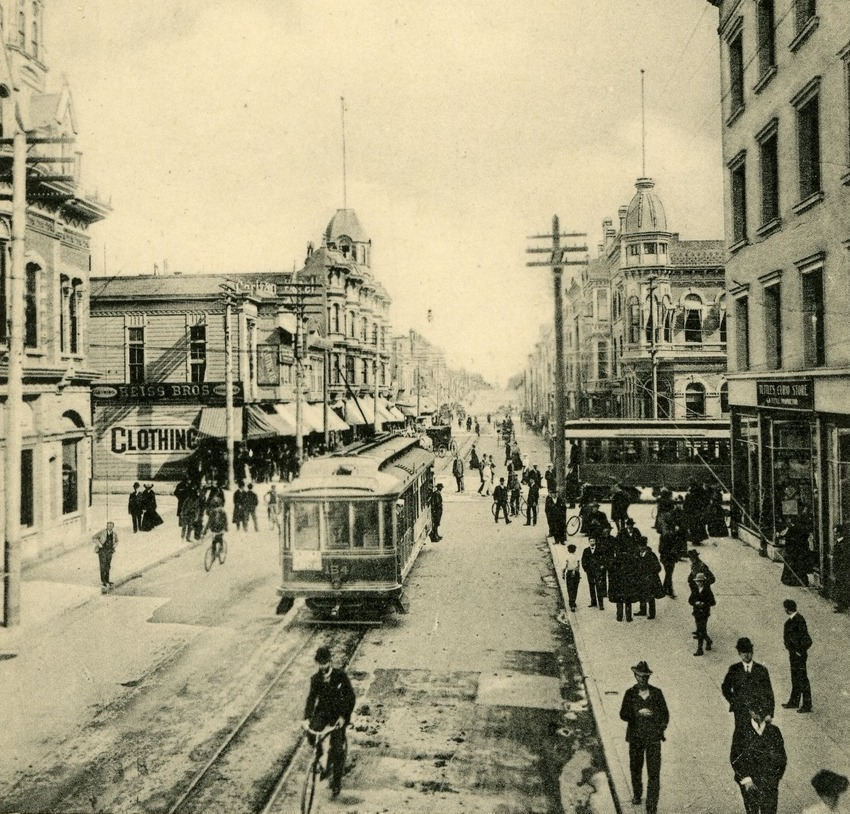
- Pasadena Electric car running along Colorado Street, 1903

Overview
- Owner: Colorado Street Railway (1886–1894); Pasadena and Los Angeles Electric Railway (1894–1902); Pasadena Electric (1902–1911); Southern Pacific Railroad (1911–1941)
- Locale: Southern California
- Termini: Downtown Pasadena, California; Lamanda Park, Pasadena, California
- Stations: 3 (plus additional stops)

Service
- Type: Streetcar
- System: Pacific Electric
- Operator(s): Pacific Electric (1911–1941)
- Rolling stock: Birney 300 Class (last used)

History
- Opened: November 9, 1886
- Closed: January 19, 1941

Technical
- Track gauge: 1,435 mm (4 ft 8 1/2 in) standard gauge
- Old gauge: 3 ft 6 in (1,067 mm)
- Electrification: Overhead line, 600 V DC

The Lamanda Park Line, also known as the Colorado Street Line, was a local streetcar line in Pasadena, California. For most of its operational history, Pacific Electric Railway streetcars ran over the line with service ending in 1941.

== History ==
The original 3 ft 6 in (1,067 mm) horsecar line was established by the Colorado Street Railway on November 9, 1886. Along with other Pasadena horsecar lines, it was purchased by the Pasadena and Los Angeles Electric Railway in 1894 and electrified. Pasadena Electric succeeded the Pasadena and Los Angeles in 1902 and was converted to standard gauge the following year. The line was extended from Hill Avenue to Lamanda Park on March 1, 1904.

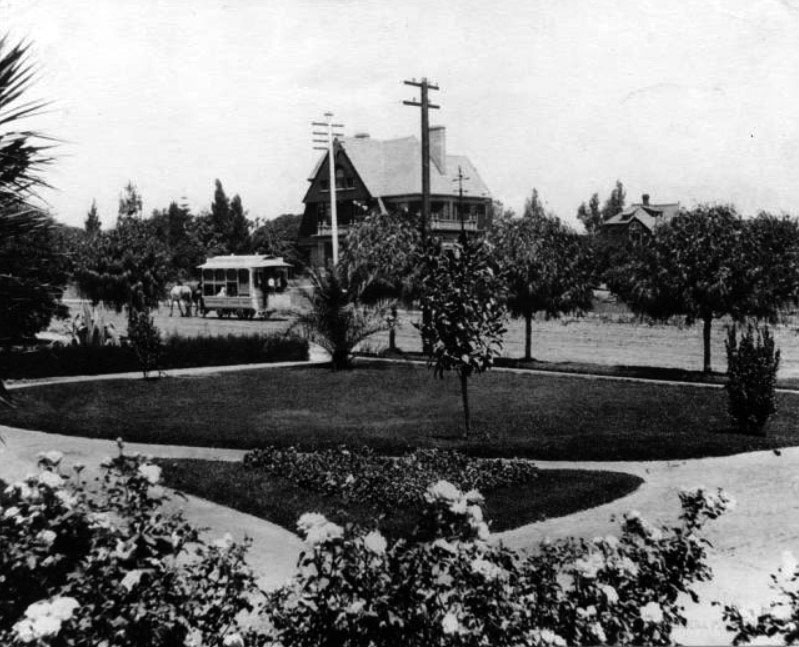
A horsecar (left of center) runs on Colorado near the intersection of Oakland Avenue, 1890.

The Pasadena Electric was absorbed into the Pacific Electric in 1911 under terms of the Great Merger. In March 1936, the tracks east of Lamanda Park Junction were abandoned. The final local car ran over the line early in the morning of January 19, 1941, but a portion of the route would continue to see Pasadena via Oak Knoll Line trains until 1950. The service was sold to Pasadena City Lines, a subsidiary of National City Lines, which ran buses over the route.

== Route ==
The line operated on Colorado Boulevard between Daisy Avenue and the Pasadena Pacific Electric station on Fair Oaks Drive. Services throughout the line's life were through routed to other Pasadena local lines or terminated in Downtown Pasadena. Running along the route of the Tournament of Roses Parade caused annual operational issues on New Year's Day, usually resulting in rail replacement bus services.

== List of major stops ==
Station	Major connections	Date opened	Date closed	City
Pasadena	East California, East Orange Grove, East Washington, Lincoln, Mount Lowe, North Fair Oaks, North Lake, Pasadena Short Line, Pasadena via Oak Knoll, South Pasadena Local, West California, West Colorado and Orange Grove	1895	1951	Pasadena
Lamanda Park Junction	Sierra Madre	1902	1941	Pasadena
Lamanda Park		1902	1936	Pasadena
