= Philip Handler =

American biochemist and nutritionist (1917–1981)

18th President of the National Academy of Sciences
- In office 1969–1981
- Preceded by: Frederick Seitz
- Succeeded by: Frank Press

Personal details
- Born: August 13, 1917 New York City
- Died: December 29, 1981 (aged 64) Boston, MA
- Scientific career
- Education: City College of New York (B.S) (1936) University of Illinois (Ph.D) (1939)
- Known for: The textbook Principles of Biochemistry, and the popular book Biology & The Future of Man
- Awards: National Medal of Science (1981)
- Fields: Biochemistry
- Workplaces: Duke University
- Thesis: The metabolism of N-substituted amino acids (1939)
- Doctoral advisor: H. E. Carter
- Doctoral students: Irwin Fridovich

Philip Handler (August 13, 1917 – December 29, 1981) was an American nutritionist, and biochemist. He was President of the United States National Academy of Sciences for two terms from 1969 to 1981. He was also a recipient of the National Medal of Science.

== Biography ==
Handler grew up in a Jewish family in New York City. He received his B.S. degree from the City College of New York in 1936 and his Ph.D. from University of Illinois in 1939. He taught at Duke University where he was named the youngest chairman of the Department of Biochemistry, at 35. Handler remained at Duke until 1969, when he accepted the position of president of the National Academy of Sciences.

As a biochemist, he published more than 200 papers on nutrition and metabolic activity. He was elected to the National Academy of Sciences in 1964. He received the National Medal of Science in 1981 for "his outstanding contribution to biochemical research, resulting in significant contributions to mankind, including research which led to a clearer understanding of pellagra".

His research led to the first understanding of nicotinic acid deficiency and the discovery of the tryptophan-nicotinic acid relationship. Handler also provided an understanding of the oxidation of sarcosine to glycine and formaldehyde, which led to the importance of single-carbon atoms in metabolism. His final work showed that methionine is the only methyl donor in mammalian metabolism and that there is no pool of methyl groups.

As President of the National Academy of Sciences, Handler was instrumental in opening a dialog on American-Soviet cooperation in outer space with his counterpart at the Soviet Academy of Sciences in 1970. The discussions would ultimately lead to a joint spaceflight in 1975, the Apollo-Soyuz Test Project. Handler was also responsible for perhaps one of the most notable statues relating to science in the United States: that of Albert Einstein at the grounds of the National Academy of Sciences in Washington, DC.

Handler was also involved in the creation of the US Department of Health, Education and Welfare (HEW), the predecessor to the US Department of Health and Human Services. Within HEW, Handler had a significant impact on the creation of a multitude of centers within the National Institutes of Health. He spurred in part by a growing interest in the biosciences, his position on various governmental committees, and the book Biology & The Future of Man, which read like a blueprint for a generation of work in the life sciences. Rather abruptly, Handler died in Boston on December 29, 1981, from pneumonia, just short of six months after leaving office at the Academy. Instead of returning to Duke University as planned, he remained in the hospital following his admission for a thorough checkup in August 1981. He chose to have his ashes placed alongside his colleagues' at Duke University Medical Center, where he began his academic research career.

== Positions held ==
=== Employment ===
- 1937–1939 Junior Chemist, U. S. Regional Soybean Byproducts Laboratory
- Duke University School of Medicine:
  - 1939–1942 Fellow and Instructor, Nutrition and Physiology
  - 1942–1945 Assistant Professor of Physiology
  - 1945–1950 Associate Professor of Biochemistry
  - 1950–1961 Professor of Biochemistry and Chairman of the Department
  - 1961–1969 James B. Duke Professor of Biochemistry (on leave 1969–1981) and Chairman of the Department
  - 1969–1981 President, National Academy of Sciences
  - 1970–1981 Distinguished Professor of Medical Sciences, George Washington University

=== Public Service ===
Governmental Positions

- 1952–1962 Consultant, Veteran's Administration
- 1964–1968 President's Science Advisory Committee
- 1968–1974 President's Science Advisory Committee
- 1969–1981 Committee on National Medal of Science
- 1980 Chairman, U. S. Delegation to the Scientific Forum of the Conference on Security and Cooperation in Europe, Hamburg
- National Institutes of Health:
  - 1953–1956 Biochemistry Study Section
  - 1956–1958 Chairman, Biochemistry Study Section
  - 1956–1959 Committee on Health Sciences Training
  - 1958–1961 National Advisory Health Council
  - 1963–1967 National Advisory Council on Research Resources and Facilities
- National Science Foundation:
  - 1958–1960 Panel on Biological Research Facilities
  - 1960–1962 Divisional Committee for Biology and Medicine
  - 1962–1974 National Science Board, Member
  - 1964–1966 National Science Board, Vice-Chairman
  - 1966–1970 National Science Board, Chairman

Non-Government

- 1953–1965 Federation of American Societies for Experimental Biology, Member of Board (1953–1965); Executive Committee (1959–1965); Chairman (1964–1965)
- 1953–1968 American Society of Biological Chemists, Secretary (1953–1958); Councillor (1958–1961); President-elect (1961); President (1962); Chairman, Publications Committee (1965–1968)
- 1967–1981 National Academy of Sciences, Chairman, Committee on the Life Sciences (1967–1970); Councillor (1966–1969); President (1969–1981)
- 1969–1981 Board of Trustees, Rockefeller University
- 1973–1979 Board of Trustees, Nutrition Foundation
- 1974–1981 Board of Governors, Hebrew University of Jerusalem
- 1981 Board of Governors, Weizmann Institute of Science

== Honors ==
- Twenty-Eight Honorary Doctorates including: City University of New York (1970), University of North Carolina at Chapel Hill (1971), University of Connecticut (1971), Temple University (1972), George Washington University (1973), Michigan State University (1975), University of Alaska (1977), Ohio State University (1978), University of Illinois (1979), University of Maryland (1979), University of Florida (1979), Medical University of South Carolina (1980), Washington University in St. Louis (1980).
- 1943 C.B. Mayer Award, New York Academy of Medicine
- 1964 Member, National Academy of Sciences
- 1964 Townsend Harris Medal, City College of New York
- 1966 Annual Orator, Harvey Gushing Society
- 1966 Fellow, American Academy of Arts and Sciences
- 1966 Sigma Xi National Lecturer
- 1969 Annual Award for Distinguished Contributions to Medical Sciences, American Medical Association
- 1969 Member, American Philosophical Society
- 1970 Benjamin Franklin Fellow, Royal Society for the Encouragement of Arts, Manufacture and Commerce
- 1970 Honorary Member, Swiss Academy of Natural Sciences
- 1972 Alumni Achievement Award, University of Illinois
- 1972 German Academy of Natural Sciences, Leopoldina
- 1973 Honorary Member, American Institute of Chemists
- 1974 Honorary Member, National Academy of Medicine of Mexico
- 1975 Copernicus Medal, Polish Academy of Sciences
- 1977 The Great Cross of Honor with Star, Government of Austria
- 1977 Insignia of Commander of the Order of Leopold II, King of Belgium
- 1978 Honorary Member, Imperial Iranian Academy of Sciences
- 1978 Commander, Order of Merit, People's Republic of Poland
- 1979 Distinguished Public Service Award, National Science Foundation
- 1981 National Medal of Science

== Selected quotes ==
Many of the quotes were found in the Memorial Program honoring his life and held at the National Academy of Sciences.

"I am committed to defense of the human rights of all persons, but those of scientists in particular. Not so much because humanity may be denied the fruits of their science, but because they are precious as human beings; because abrogation of their rights is injurious to all mankind; because, as thoughtful intellectuals, scientists not infrequently become involved in the defense of the human rights of others..." – "Science in a Free Society" The Phi Beta Kappa Bicentennial Lecture. College of William and Mary. December 6, 1976

"Creative scientific research is one of the very purposes of our society akin to imaginative scholarship in the humanities and innovation in the arts. Surely, no other course available to this civilization is as hopeful as the continuing subtle interplay of science and developing technology." From "The University in a World in Transition." The Convocation Address at the One Hundred and Fiftieth Anniversary of the University of Virginia. October 21, 1969.

"Do not fear change – help to guide it. Every technology since fire and the wheel confronted humanity simultaneously with the prospect of great benefit – and of considerable hazard, with potential for good and for evil." From "Science in a Free Society" A Commencement Ceremony Address. Southwestern at Memphis. May 30, 1977.

Professional and academic associations
Preceded by Frederick Seitz	President of the National Academy of Sciences; 1969 – 1981	Succeeded by Frank Press
