= Lamanda Park, Pasadena, California =

Coordinates: 34.1459°N 118.0951°W

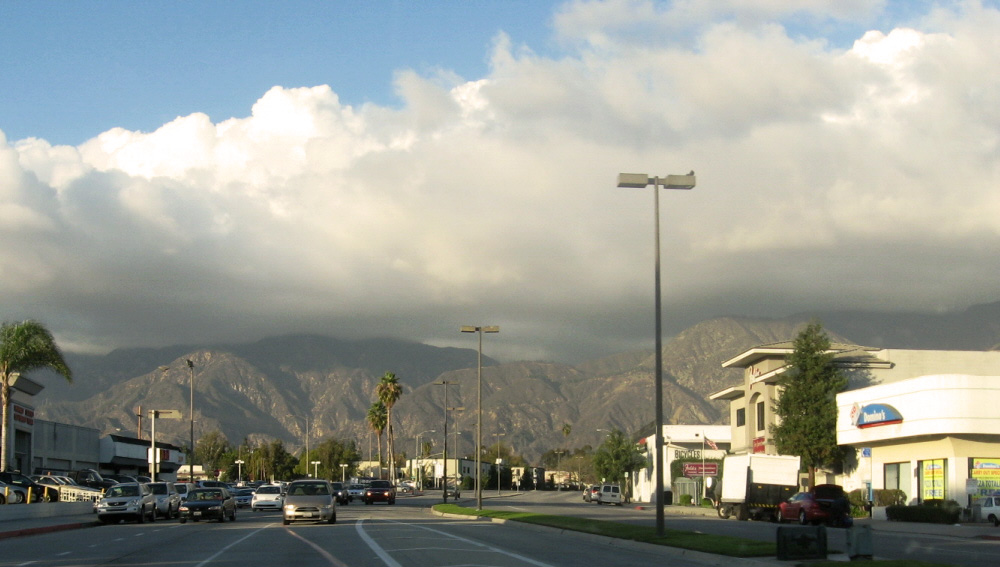
Sierra Madre Boulevard in Lamanda Park.

Lamanda Park is a neighborhood in Pasadena, California. It is bordered roughly by Foothill Boulevard to the north, Del Mar Boulevard to the south, the Eaton Wash to the east, and Allen Avenue to the west, with a panhandle extending south along the western bank of the Eaton Wash. Like Annandale, it was originally a small township that was gradually enveloped by Pasadena. It was annexed in 1920. Even today, many commercial enterprises and newspapers still identify the area as a separate community.

Lamanda is a name derived from Spanish meaning "the proposal".

== Landmarks ==
Lamanda Park's appearance is noticeably different from the rest of Pasadena. Much like Raymond Hill, it is a historically industrial area, and is notable for the presence of large warehouses, factories, lumber yards, and garages. As much of the neighborhood wasn't developed until the late 1950s, few area homes are older than 50 years.

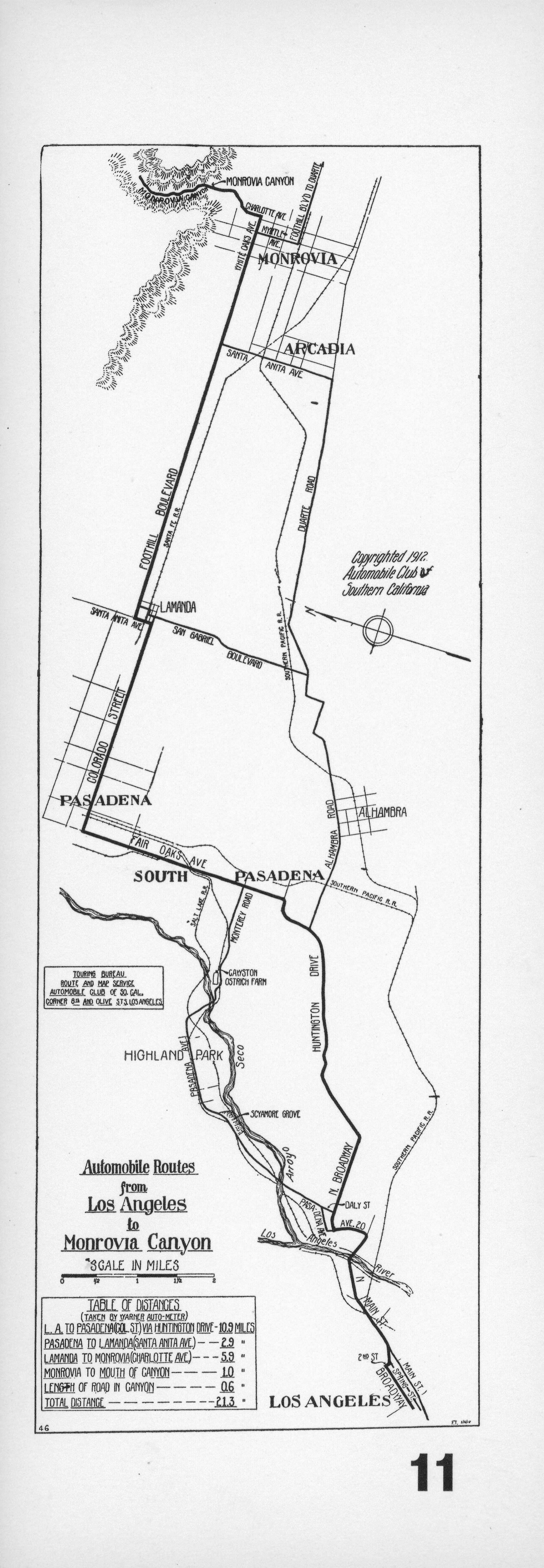
Lamanda was on the route from Los Angeles to Monrovia Canyon in 1912

== Education ==
Lamanda Park is served by Hamilton, Willard, and Field Elementary Schools, Wilson Middle School, and Pasadena High School

Pasadena Public Library operates the Lamanda Park branch at the corner of Altadena Drive and Morningside Street.

== Transportation ==
Lamanda Park is served by Metro Local line 267; as well as Pasadena Transit route 60, and Foothill Transit line 187.

== Politics ==
Lamanda Park is a generally more conservative than other parts of the city, due in part to a large immigrant population and older, socially conservative residents. In the City Council, it is split between the 2nd, 4th, and 7th districts.

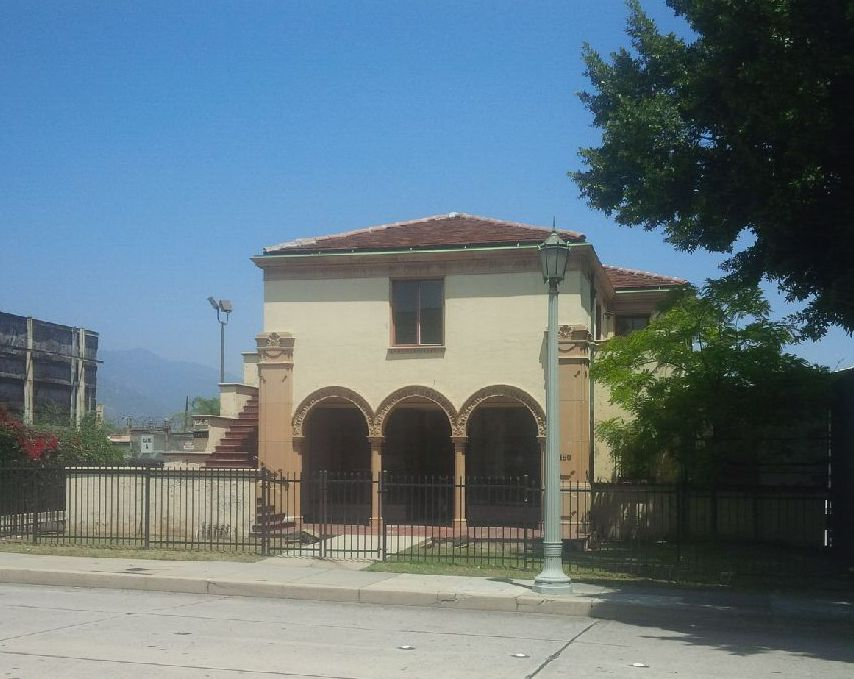
1933 Lamanda Park power plant-distribution

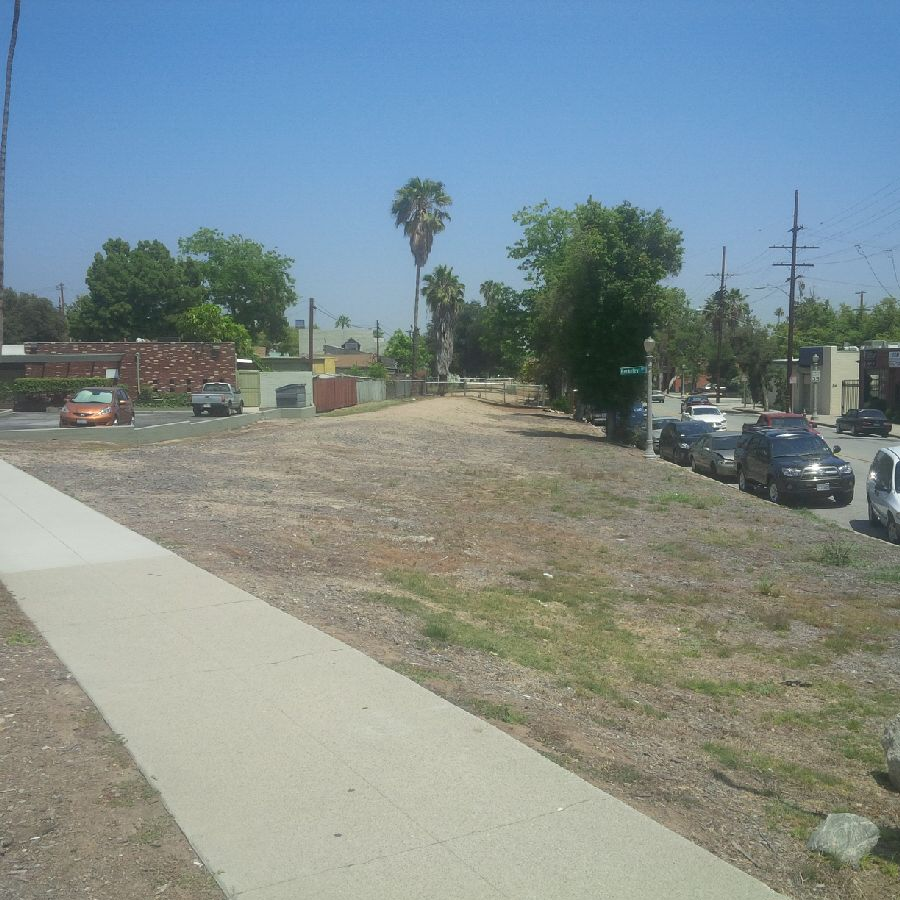
Rail side line in Lamanda Park, used in past to load Lamanda Park Wine and Citrus at Foothill and Walnut

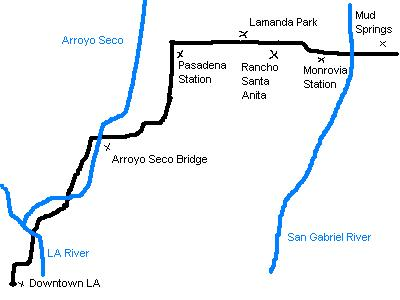
Map of the 1886 Los Angeles and San Gabriel Valley Railroad

== History ==
Lamanda Park began as a 1,300 acres Sunny Slope Ranch large agricultural ranch purchased and owned by German immigrant L.J. Rose. Later a number of wineries opened in Lamanda Park like: Sunny Slope Winery, Sierra Madre Vintage Company, Golden Park Winery, Mountain Wine Company, and A. Brighton Winery. These operated from 1865 to 1923. On September 16, 1885, the Los Angeles and San Gabriel Valley Railroad opened the first train stop at Lamanda Park. The rail line ran from Lamanda Park to downtown Los Angeles, with a stop at downtown Pasadena and later South Pasadena, California. By January 1887 the rail line continued on to Azusa, California and later that year to Monrovia, California. At its peak Lamanda Park had its own paper, Herald Lamanda Park, post office, movie house, bank and school. Park had many citrus groves and vineyards, the station provided shipping for these goods. Prohibition ended the wineries and all that remains are grape-inspired street names like: Del Vina, Vine, Vinedo, Vineyard, and Mataro. The last Citrus packer was Sierra-Madre Lamanda Park Citrus Association, they boxed oranges, lemons, limes, and grapefruit. The packing house was at the corner of Walnut Street and San Gabriel Boulevard. Pacific Electric initiated their Lamanda Park Line streetcar service to Pasadena in 1905 and operated the line until 1941. The Los Angeles and San Gabriel Valley Railroad line later became part of the Atchison, Topeka and Santa Fe Railway, and service to Lamanda Park ended in the 1950s. This rail right-of-way later became the A Line tracks, and a stop returned nearby with the Sierra Madre Villa station. Lamanda Park doubles as Bedford Falls in 1946 It's a Wonderful Life movie, including a shot at the Lamanda Park train station. The station was demolished in 1953.
