= Charles Archambeau =

American geophysicist

- Born: September 1, 1933
- Died: October 2, 2020 (aged 87)
- Education: California Institute of Technology
- Awards: 1988 MacArthur Fellows Program
- Scientific career
- Fields: Geophysics
- Institutions: University of Colorado

Charles B. Archambeau (September 1, 1933 – October 2, 2020) was an American geophysicist.

== Life ==
He graduated from California Institute of Technology with a PhD in 1964. He taught at University of Colorado, and California Institute of Technology.

In 1997, he studied the geophysics of Yucca Mountain, with John Davies, commissioned by the state of Nevada. He is President of Technology Research Associates corporation. In 2010, he signed a letter in favor of the Integral Fast Reactor.

== Awards ==
- 1988 MacArthur Fellows Program

== Works ==
- Dialogs on the Yucca Mountain controversy, Charles B. Archambeau, Christine M. Schluter, Jerry S. Szymanski, TRAC (Technology and Resource Assessment Corporation), 1993
- Earthquake hazards determinations based on tectonic stress measurements, University of Colorado, 1981
- Deterministic Methods of Seismic Source Identification, Defense Technical Information Center, 1983
