= Hugo Benioff =

American seismologist

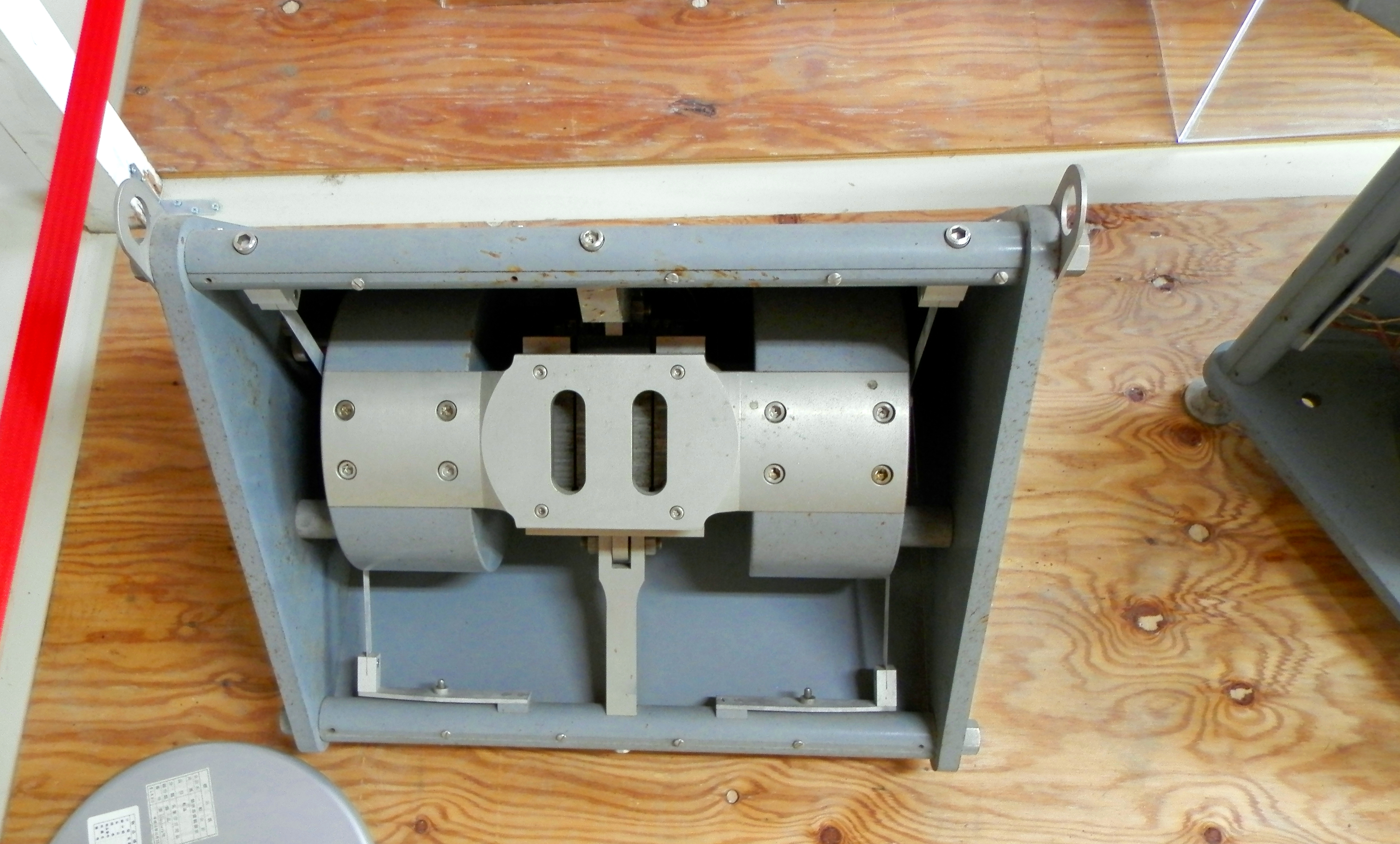
The short-period seismograph Benioff contrived.

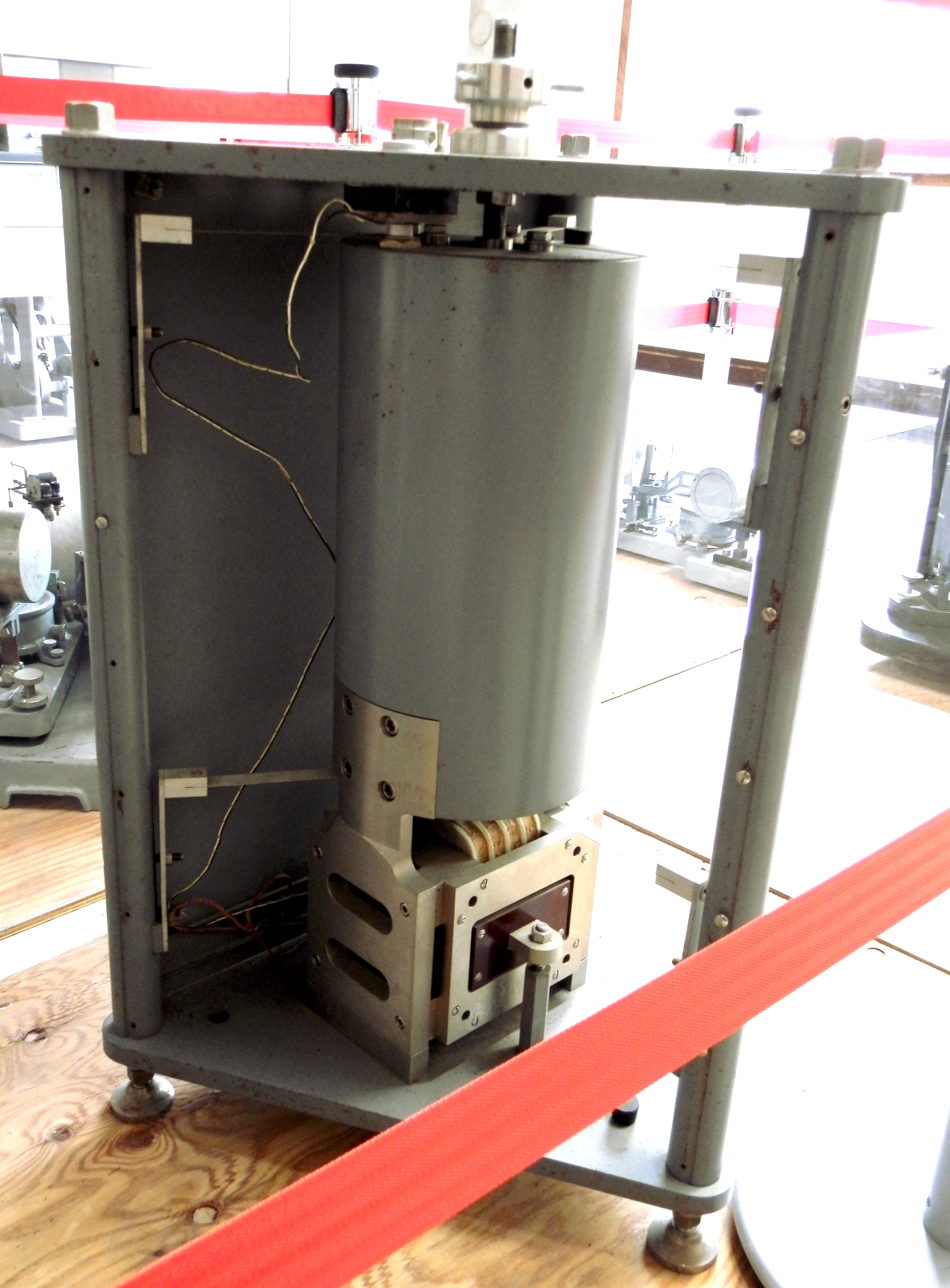
The short-period seismograph Benioff contrived.

Victor Hugo Benioff (September 14, 1899 – February 29, 1968) was an American seismologist and a professor at the California Institute of Technology. He is best remembered for his work in charting the location of deep earthquakes in the Pacific Ocean.

Benioff was born in Los Angeles. His father was a Jewish immigrant from Kyiv in the Russian Empire and his mother a Lutheran from Sweden. After graduating from Pomona College in 1921, Benioff began his career with the idea of being an astronomer and worked for a time at Mount Wilson Observatory, but when he found that astronomers work at night and sleep in the daytime, he quickly switched to seismology. He joined the Seismological Laboratory in 1924 and received his Ph.D. from the California Institute of Technology in 1935.

Benioff is noted as a pioneer in the design of earthquake instruments. One of his first instruments, created in 1932, was the Benioff seismograph, which senses the movement of the earth – these instruments are now used in every country in the world. Equally famous is the Benioff strain instrument, which records the stretching of the Earth's surface. One of his most recent accomplishments was a refined version of the old Benioff seismometer which has given seismologists more knowledge about the cause of very deep earthquakes.

Benioff noticed that earthquake sources get deeper under the overriding tectonic plate proceeding away from the trench at a subduction zone. He realized that this inclined array of earthquake sources indicate the position of the portion of the plate that has already been subducted. Thus, that pattern of earthquakes is known as a Wadati–Benioff zone.

From the early 1930s, Benioff also worked on creating electric musical instruments; in particular a piano, violin and cello. He continued developing these instruments for the rest of his life, working for over two decades with pianist Rosalyn Tureck and also, towards the end of his life with the Baldwin Piano Company. He was elected a fellow of the American Academy of Arts and Sciences in 1958. Also in the same year he was elected as president of Seismological Society of America (1958).

== See also ==
- List of geophysicists
