= Annandale, California =

Neighborhood in USA

Coordinates: 34.1451°N 118.1757°W

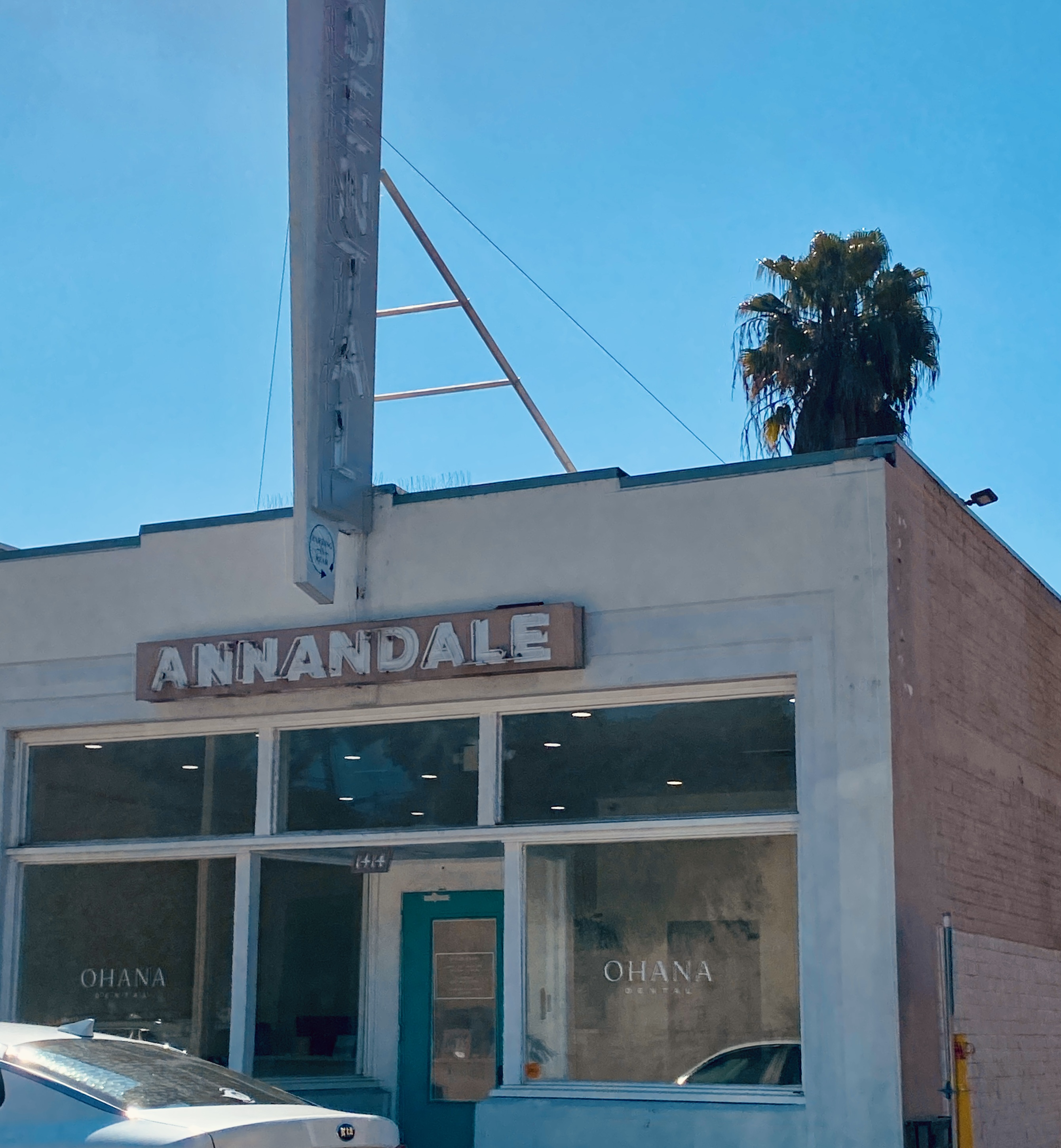
This Annandale storefront is now a dental office

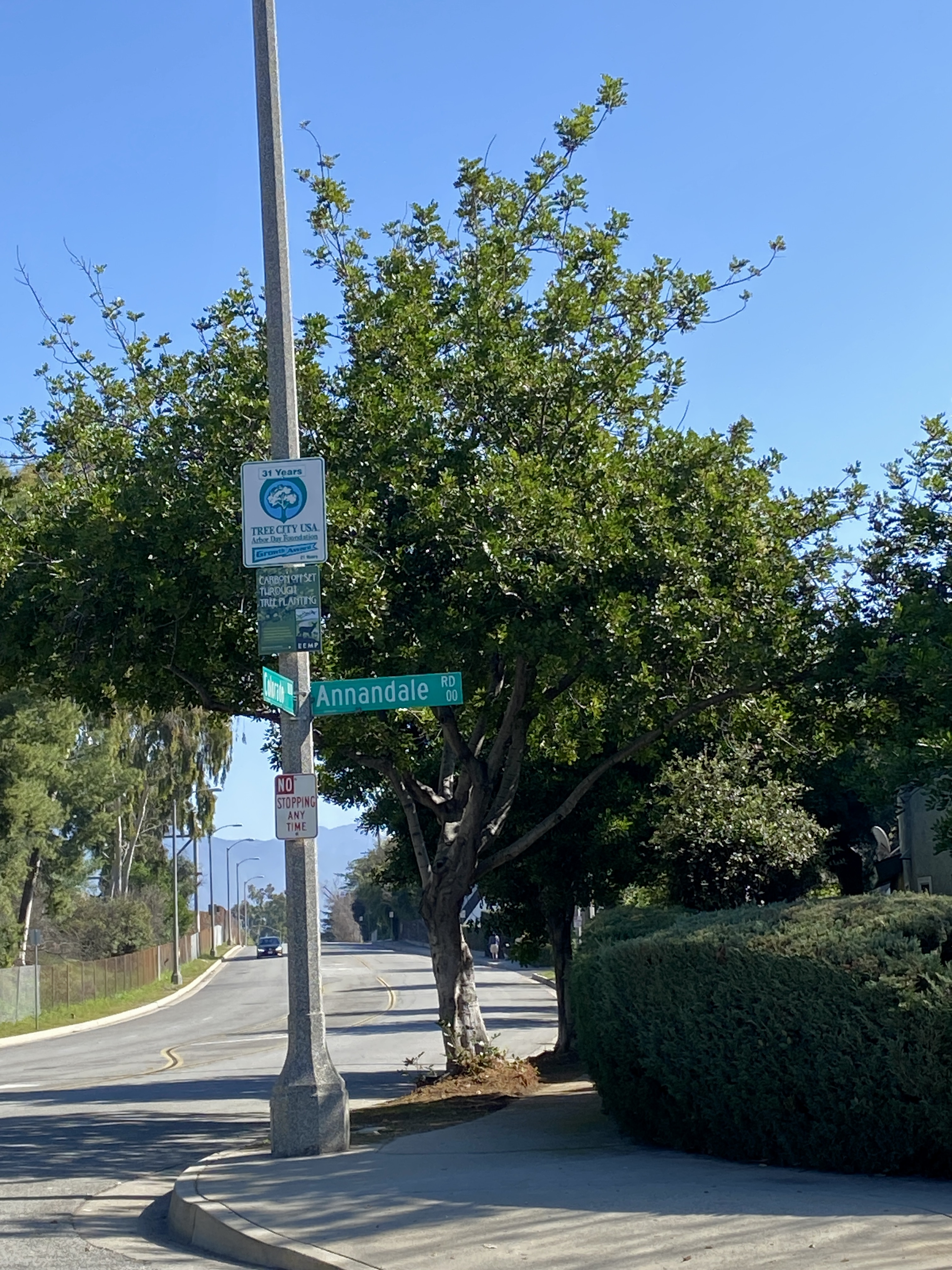
Annandale Road near San Rafael Park, Pasadena

Annandale is a former community in Los Angeles County, California that is now a neighborhood in Los Angeles, California and Pasadena, California. The Pasadena portion is bordered by Colorado Boulevard to the north, San Rafael Avenue to the east, and the Pasadena-Los Angeles border to the south and west. The Los Angeles portion is approximately bordered by Meridian Street, Figueroa Street, Colorado Blvd and the Pasadena-Los Angeles border. The main roads through the neighborhood are Figueroa Street, Avenue 64 and La Loma Road.

The portions of Annandale now in Los Angeles were annexed by Los Angeles on February 24, 1924.

The Pacific Electric Railway served Annandale with the Annandale Line from 1902 to 1928.

== Landmarks ==
Most of the commercial development in the neighborhood is in a triangular area of only a few blocks where Colorado Boulevard and Avenue 64 meet. Annandale's only park, San Rafael Park, is also in this triangular area. Most of the neighborhood consists of upper-middle-class houses built in the 1920s and 1930s. The neighborhood's relative isolation from the rest of Pasadena gives it a very different character, including a canyon with a stream. A small lake at the district's center, created for irrigation, exists from the time of the San Rafael Winery, which no longer exists.

The Church of the Angels, an Episcopal Church which has been used as a filming location for several movies and television shows, is located in the Annandale area.

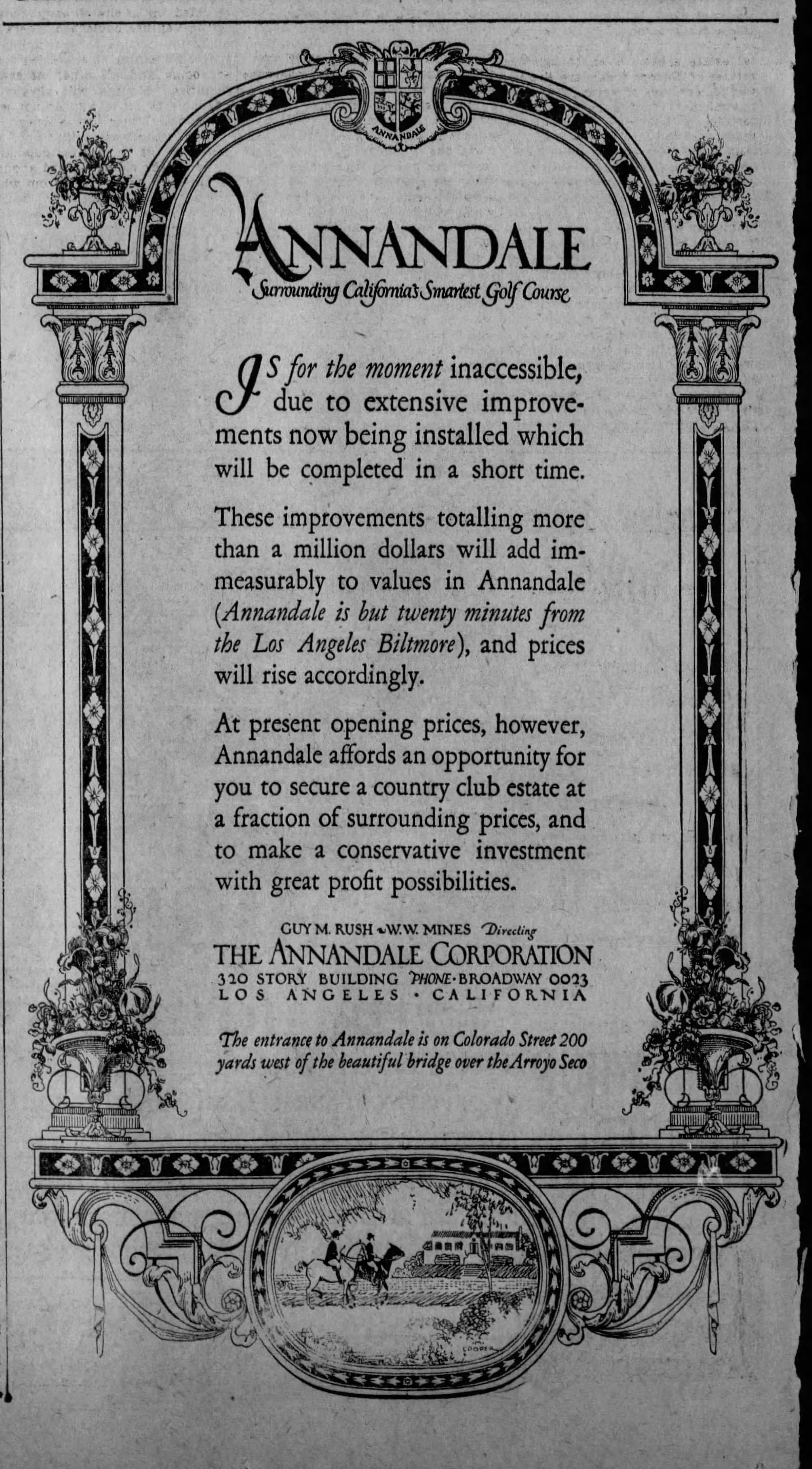
"Annandale" Los Angeles Evening Express, October 2, 1926

A portion of the neighborhood in the Pasadena section was designated the Poppy Peak Historic District on December 23, 2009.

== Education ==
San Rafael Elementary School is the only school in the Pasadena portion of the neighborhood. Annandale is served by Blair High School, in Oak Knoll, for both middle and high school.

Annandale School is located in the Los Angeles portion of the neighborhood. Residents of the Los Angeles portion of the neighborhood attend Annandale School, Burbank Middle School and Eagle Rock High School

== Transportation ==
Annandale is served by Metro Local lines 81, 180 and 256.
