= Kjartansson constant Q model =

The Kjartansson constant Q model uses mathematical Q models to explain how the earth responds to seismic waves and is widely used in seismic geophysical applications. Because these models satisfies the Krämers–Krönig relations they should be preferable to the Kolsky model in seismic inverse Q filtering. Kjartanssons model is a simplification of the first of Azimi Q models (1968).

== Kjartansson constant Q model ==
Kjartanssons model is a simplification of the first of Azimi Q models. Azimi proposed his first model together with Strick (1967) and has the attenuation proportional to |w|^{1 − γ|} and is:

$$\alpha (w)=a_1|w|^{1-\gamma} \quad (1.1)$$

The phase velocity is written:

$$\frac {1}{c(w)} = \frac {1}{c_\infty} +a_1|w|^{-\gamma} \cot(\frac{\pi \gamma}{2}) \quad (1.2)$$

If the phase velocity goes to infinity in the first term on the right, we simply has:

$$\frac {1}{c(w)} = a_1|w|^{-\gamma} \cot(\frac{\pi \gamma}{2}) \quad (1.2)$$

This is Kjartansson constant Q model.

== Computations ==
Studying the attenuation coefficient and phase velocity, and compare them with Kolskys Q model we have plotted the result on fig.1. The data for the models are taken from Ursin and Toverud.

Data for the Kolsky model (blue):

c_{r} = 2000 m/s, Q_{r} = 100, w_{r} = 2π100

Data for Kjartansson constant Q model (green):

a_{1} = 2.5 × 10 ^{−6}, γ = 0.0031

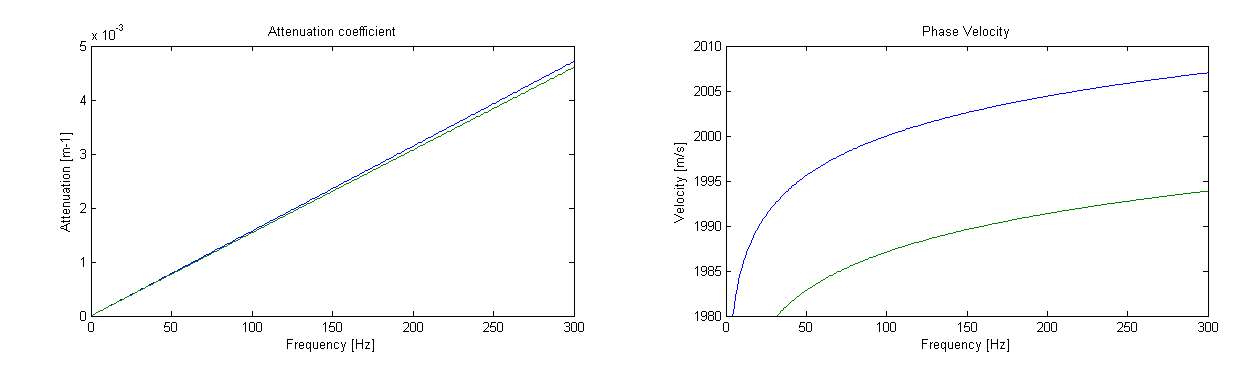
Fig.1.Kjartansson constant Q model and the Kolsky model
