= Standard linear solid Q model =

In seismology, the standard linear solid Q model (SLS Q model) for attenuation and dispersion, also known as the Zener Q model, is one of many Q models that gives a definition of how the earth responds to seismic waves. When a plane wave propagates through a homogeneous viscoelastic medium, the effects of amplitude attenuation and velocity dispersion may be combined conveniently into a single dimensionless parameter, Q, the medium-quality factor.

Transmission losses may occur due to friction or fluid movement, and whatever the physical mechanism, they can be conveniently described with an empirical formulation where elastic moduli and propagation velocity are complex functions of frequency. Ursin and Toverud compared different Q models including the above model (SLS-model).

In order to compare the different models they considered plane-wave propagation in a homogeneous viscoelastic medium. They used the Kolsky-Futterman model as a reference and studied the SLS model. This model was compared with the Kolsky-Futterman model.

The Kolsky-Futterman model was first described in the article ‘Dispersive body waves’ by Futterman (1962).

== Kolsky's attenuation-dispersion model ==
The Kolsky model assumes the attenuation α(w) to be strictly linear with frequency over the range of measurement:

$$\alpha=\frac {|w|}{(2 c_r Q_r)} \quad (1)$$

And defines the phase velocity as:

$$\frac {1}{c(w)} =\frac {1}{c_r} (1-\frac {1}{\pi Q_r} ln |\frac{w}{w_r}|) \quad (2)$$

== SLS model ==
The standard linear solid model is developed from the stress-strain relation. Using a linear combination of springs and dashpots to represent elastic and viscous components, Ursin and Toverud used one relaxation time. The model was first developed by Zener. The attenuation is given by:

$$\alpha=\frac {(w\tau_r)^2}{c_0 Q_c \tau_r[1+(w\tau_r)^2]} \quad (3)$$

And defines the phase velocity as:

$$\frac {1}{c(w)} =\frac {1}{c_0} [1- \frac {(w\tau_r)^2}{Q_c[1+(w\tau_r)^2]}] \quad (4)$$

== Computations ==
For each of the Q models, Ursin and Toverud computed the attenuation (1)(3) in the frequency band 0–300 Hz. Figure 1. presents the graph for the Kolsky model (blue) with two datasets (left and right) and same data – attenuation with c_{r}=2000 m/s, Q_{r}=100 and w_{r}=2π100 Hz.

The SLS model (green) has two different datasets,

left c_{0}=1990 m/s, Q_{c}=100 and τ_{r}^{−1}=2π100

right c_{0}=1985 m/s, Q_{c}=84.71 and τ_{r}^{−1}=6.75x100

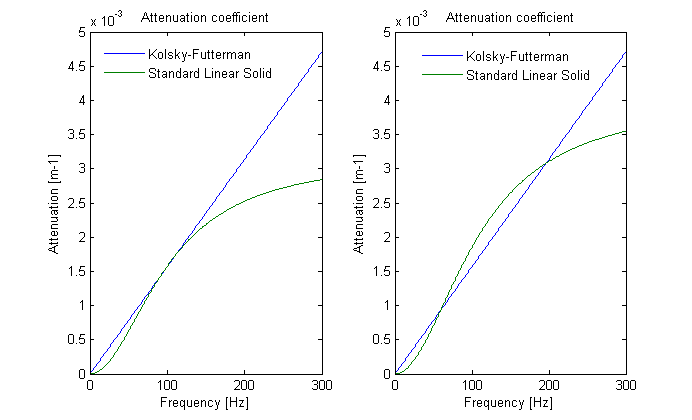
Fig.1.Attenuation – Kolsky model and Zener model (Standard Linear Solid)
