= Q models (seismology) =

Mathematical models

In reflection seismology, Q models are mathematical models used to study how the Earth affects seismic waves by measuring energy loss and speed changes as the waves travel through materials like rock. These models focus on the Q factor (seismic quality factor, where higher Q means less energy loss) to capture anelastic attenuation (or absorption)—the gradual loss of wave energy into heat due to fluid movement and friction in the subsurface, eventually causing the wave to disappear completely.

Introduced as a single parameter to combine amplitude weakening and velocity dispersion, Q helps explain why deeper seismic images lose clarity as wave effects worsen deeper down. Researchers like Bjørn Ursin and Tommy Toverud have compared different Q models to better understand these transmission losses, using equations that adapt to the medium’s changing properties.

== Basics ==
In order to compare the different models they considered plane-wave propagation in a homogeneous viscoelastic medium. They used the Kolsky–Futterman model as a reference and studied several other models. These other models were compared with the behavior of the Kolsky–Futterman model.

The Kolsky–Futterman model was first described in the article ‘Dispersive body waves’ by Futterman (1962).

'Seismic inverse Q-filtering' by Yanghua Wang (2008) contains an outline discussing the theory of Futterman, beginning with the wave equation:

$$\frac { dU(r,w)}{ dr} - ikU(r,w)=0 \quad (1.1)$$

where U(r,w) is the plane wave of radial frequency w at travel distance r, k is the wavenumber and i is the imaginary unit. Reflection seismograms record the reflection wave along the propagation path r from the source to reflector and back to the surface.

Equation (1.1) has an analytical solution given by:

$$U(r+\bigtriangleup r,w) =U(r,w)\exp (ik\bigtriangleup r) \quad (1.2)$$

where k is the wave number. When the wave propagates in inhomogeneous seismic media the propagation constant k must be a complex value that includes not only an imaginary part, the frequency-dependent attenuation coefficient, but also a real part, the dispersive wave number. We can call this K(w) a propagation constant in line with Futterman.

$$K(iw) =k(w)+ i a(w) \quad (1.3)$$

k(w) can be linked to the phase velocity of the wave with the formula:

$$c(w)=\frac {w}{k(w)} \quad (1.4)$$

== Kolsky's attenuation-dispersion model ==
To obtain a solution that can be applied to seismic k(w) must be connected to a function that represents the way in which U(r,w) propagates in the seismic media. This function can be regarded as a Q-model.

In his outline Wang calls the Kolsky–Futterman model the Kolsky model. The model assumes the attenuation α(w) to be strictly linear with frequency over the range of measurement:

$$\alpha=\frac {|w|}{(2 c_r Q_r)} \quad (1.5)$$

And defines the phase velocity as:

$$\frac {1}{c(w)} =\frac {1}{c_r} (1-\frac {1}{\pi Q_r} \ln |\frac{w}{w_r}|) \quad (1.6)$$

where c_{r} and Q_{r} are the phase velocity and the Q value at a reference frequency w_{r}.

For a large value of Qr >> 1 the solution (1.6) can be approximated to

$$\frac {1}{c(w)} =\frac {1}{c_r}  |\frac{w}{w_r}|^{-\gamma} \quad (1.7)$$

where

$$\gamma =(\pi Q_r)^{-1}$$

Kolsky’s model was derived from and fit well with experimental observations. The theory for materials satisfying the linear attenuation assumption requires that the reference frequency w_{r} is a finite (arbitrarily small but nonzero) cut-off on the absorption. According to Kolsky, we are free to choose w_{r} following the phenomenological criterion that it be small compared with the lowest measured frequency w in the frequency band. More information regarding this concept can be found in Futterman (1962)

== Computations ==
For each of the Q models Ursin B. and Toverud T. presented in their article they computed the attenuation (1.5) and phase velocity (1.6) in the frequency band 0–300 Hz. Fig.1. presents the graph for the Kolsky model – attenuation (left) and phase velocity (right) with c_{r} = 2000 m/s, Q_{r} = 100 and w_{r} = 2π100 Hz.

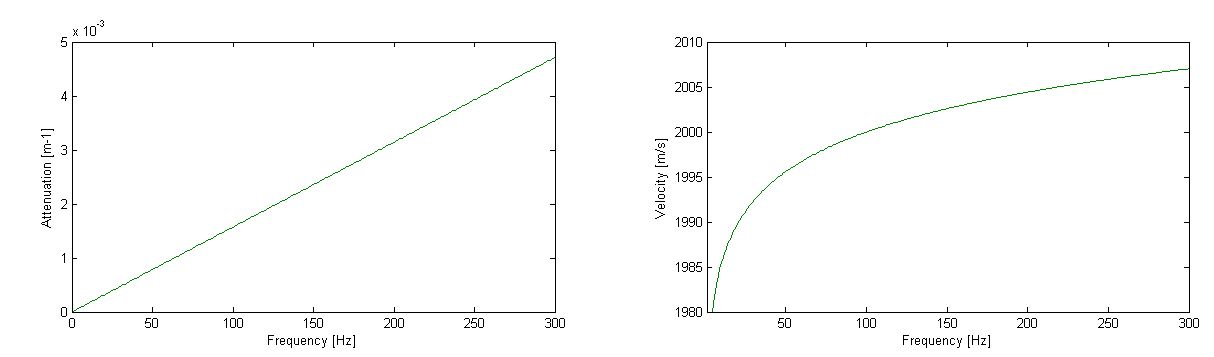
Fig.1.Attenuation - dispersion Kolsky model

== Q models ==
Wang listed the different Q models that Ursin B. and Toverud T. applied in their study, classifying the models into two groups. The first group consists of models 1-5 below, the other group including models 6-8. The main difference between these two groups is the behaviour of the phase velocity when the frequency approaches zero. Whereas the first group has a zero-valued phase velocity, the second group has a finite, nonzero phase velocity.

1) the Kolsky models (linear attenuation)

2) the Strick–Azimi model (power-law attenuation)

3) the Kjartansson model (constant Q)

4) the Azimi models (non-linear attenuation)

5) Müller's model (power-law Q)

6) SLS (standard linear solid) Q model for attenuation and dispersion, also known as the Zener model

7) the Cole–Cole model (a general linear-solid)

8) a new general linear model
