= Anelastic attenuation factor =

In reflection seismology, the anelastic attenuation factor or seismic quality factor, often expressed as the Q factor (where higher Q means less energy loss), measures how seismic waves weaken due to anelastic attenuation—the loss of wave energy that eventually ends up as heat, caused by fluid movement and friction within the Earth's subsurface. As a wave travels through a medium like rock, this absorption gradually reduces its strength and can eventually make it disappear completely. The Q factor helps geophysicists understand these effects on seismic signals, aiding in the study of underground structures.

== Quality factor, Q ==
Q is defined as

$$Q = 2{\pi}\left ( \frac{E}{{\delta}E} \right )$$

where $\frac{{\delta}E}{E}$ is the fraction of energy lost per cycle.

The earth preferentially attenuates higher frequencies, resulting in the loss of signal resolution as the seismic wave propagates. Quantitative seismic attribute analysis of amplitude versus offset effects is complicated by anelastic attenuation because it is superimposed upon the AVO effects. The rate of anelastic attenuation itself also contains additional information about the lithology and reservoir conditions such as porosity, saturation and pore pressure so it can be used as a useful reservoir characterization tool.

Therefore, if Q can be accurately measured then it can be used for both compensation for the loss of information in the data and for seismic attribute analysis.

== Measurement of Q ==
=== Spectral ratio method ===
The geometry of a zero-offset vertical seismic profile (VSP) makes it an ideal survey to use for the calculation of Q using the spectral ratio method. This is because of the coincident raypaths that traverse a given rock layer, ensuring that the only path difference between two reflected waves (one from the top of the interval and one from the bottom) is the interval of interest. Stacked surface seismic reflection traces would offer similar signal-to-noise ratio over a much larger area but cannot be used with this method because every sample represents a different raypath and therefore will have experienced different attenuation effects.

Seismic wavelets captured before and after traversing a medium with seismic quality factor, Q, on coincident raypaths will have amplitudes that are related as follows:

$$\frac{A_{final}}{A_{initial}}=R.G.e^{{\frac{-{\pi}ft}{Q}}}$$;

where ${A_{final}}$ and ${A_{initial}}$ are the amplitudes at frequency $f$ after and before traversing the medium; $R$ is the reflection coefficient; $G$ is the geometrical spreading factor and $t$ is the time taken to traverse the medium.

Taking logarithms of both sides and rearranging:

$$ln\left ( \frac{A_{final}}{A_{initial}} \right )=\left ( \frac{-{\pi}t}{Q} \right )f +ln(RG)$$

$$Y = m X + C$$

This equation shows that if the logarithm of the spectral ratio of the amplitudes before and after traversing the medium is plotted as a function of frequency, it should yield a linear relationship with an intercept measuring the elastic losses (R and G) and the gradient measuring the inelastic losses, which can be used to find Q.

The above formulation implies that Q is independent of frequency. If Q is frequency-dependent, the spectral ratio method can produce systematic bias in Q estimates

In practice prominent phases seen on seismograms are used for estimating the Q. Lg is often the strongest phase on the seismogram at regional distances from 2° to 25°, because of its small-energy leakage into the mantle and used frequently for estimation of crustal Q. However, attenuation of this phase has different characteristics at oceanic crust. Lg may be suddenly disappeared along a particular propagation path which is commonly seen at continental-oceanic transition zones. This phenomenon refers as "Lg-Blockage" and its exact mechanism is still a puzzle.

== See also ==
- Acoustic attenuation
- Attenuation
- Q models (seismology)
- Kolsky Q models
- Azimi Q models
