= Kolsky Q models =

In seismology, the Kolsky Q models are mathematical Q models developed by Herbert Kolsky to describe how seismic waves lose energy and change speed as they travel through the Earth, widely used in seismic data processing. The basic Kolsky model, introduced in Kolsky’s 1963 book Stress Waves in Solids, is favored for its simplicity but doesn’t fully meet key physics standards, such as the minimum phase criterion or the Kramers-Kronig relations. The modified Kolsky model, later detailed in Yong-Xiong Wang’s 2008 book Seismic Inverse Q Filtering, improves accuracy by better representing velocity dispersion within seismic frequency ranges. These models help geophysicists analyze subsurface properties by measuring the Q factor (how much energy waves lose).

== Basic ==
The theoretical background for mathematical Q models can be found in the Wikipedia article: Mathematical Q models. Here we found a function K(w) we can call a propagation constant in line with Futterman.

$$K(iw) =k(w)+ i a(w) \quad (1.3)$$

k(w) can be linked to the phase velocity of the seismic wave with the formula:

$$c(w)=\frac {w}{k(w)} \quad (1.4)$$

To obtain a solution that can be applied to seismic k(w) must be connected to a function that represent the way the seismic wave propagates in the seismic media. This functions can be regarded as a Q-model.

In his outline Wang calls the Kolsky-Futterman model the Kolsky model. The model assumes the attenuation α(w) to be strictly linear with frequency over the range of measurement:

$$\alpha=\frac {|w|}{(2 c_r Q_r)} \quad (1.5)$$

And defines the phase velocity as:

$$\frac {1}{c(w)} =\frac {1}{c_r} (1-\frac {1}{\pi Q_r} ln |\frac{w}{w_r}|) \quad (1.6)$$

Where c_{r} and Q_{r} are the phase velocity and the Q value at a reference frequency w_{r}.

For a large value of Qr >>1 the solution (1.6) can be approximated to

$$\frac {1}{c(w)} =\frac {1}{c_r}  |\frac{w}{w_r}|^{-\gamma} \quad (1.7)$$

where

$$\gamma =(\pi Q_r)^{-1}$$

Kolsky’s model was derived from and fitted well with experimental observations. A requirement in the theory for materials satisfying the linear attenuation assumption is that the reference frequency w_{r} is a finite (arbitrarily small but nonzero) cut-off on the absorption. According to Kolsky, we are free to choose w_{r} following the phenomenological criterion that it be small compared with the lowest measured frequency w in the frequency band. Those who want a deeper insight into this concept can go to Futterman (1962)

== Computations ==
Bjørn Ursin and Tommy Toverud published an article where they compared different Q models. They used the Kolsky model as a reference model.

For each of the Q models Ursin B. and Toverud T. presented in their article they computed the attenuation (1.5) and phase velocity (1.6) in the frequency band 0–300 Hz. Fig.1. presents the graph for the Kolsky model - attenuation (left) and phase velocity (right) with c_{r}=2000 m/s, Q_{r}=100 and w_{r}=2π100 Hz.

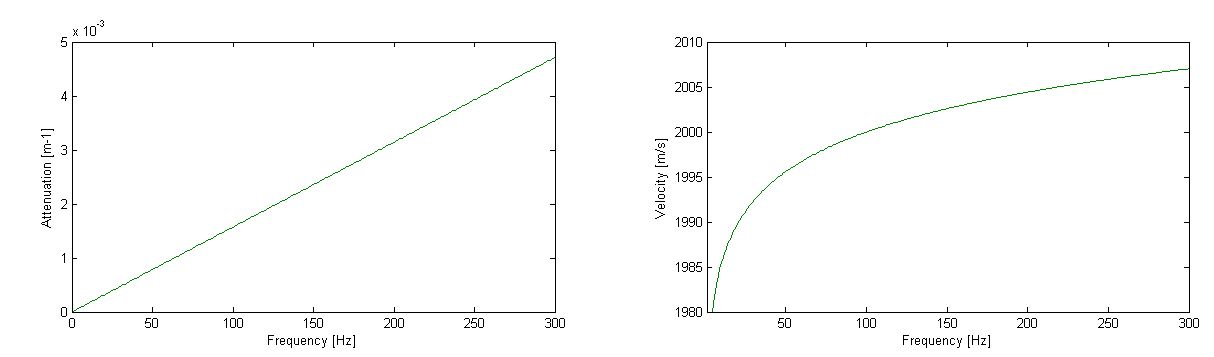
Fig.1.Attenuation - dispersion Kolsky model

If we change the value for w_{r} to a much lower value 2π0.01 Hz, we will get a higher phase velocity for all frequencies:

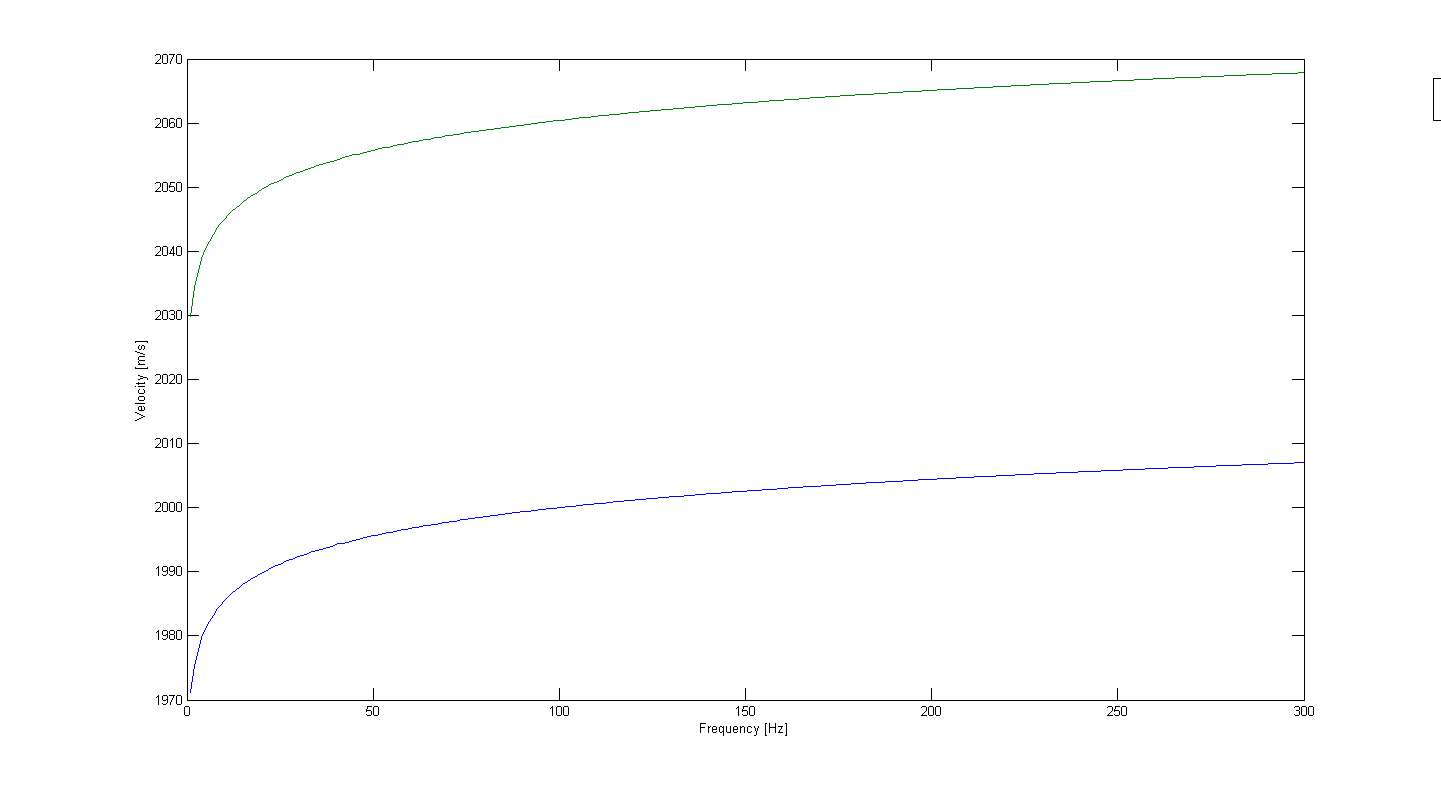
Fig.2.Dispersion Kolsky model reference frequency w_{r}=2π0.01 Hz(green) w_{r}=2π100 Hz(blue)

== Modification to the Kolsky model ==
The choice of w_{r} as the lowest frequency in the frequency band will introduce phase errors when we use the Kolsky model as an inverse Q filter. This is very well documented in Wang (2008). So the phase velocity formula in the basic Kolsky model is modified by using the highest frequency w_{h} as a reference. It could very well be the same as was used by Bjørn Ursin and Tommy Toverud above, w_{h}=2π100. Hz Then we can get a correct solution with inverse Q filtering with the Kolsky model.
