= List of members of the National Academy of Sciences (geophysics) =

This list is a subsection of the List of members of the National Academy of Sciences, which includes members and international members of the United States National Academy of Sciences, living and deceased, each affiliated with one of the academy's disciplinary sections. Members are listed under their primary section, and each entry gives the person's name, primary institution, and election year. For deceased members, the year of death is noted.

== Geophysics ==
Name	Institution	Date Elected
Mario Humberto Acuña (died 2009)	National Aeronautics and Space Administration	2007
Thomas J. Ahrens (died 2010)	California Institute of Technology	1992
Keiiti Aki (died 2005)	Institut de Physique du Globe de Paris	1979
Hannes Alfvén (died 1995)	KTH Royal Institute of Technology	1966
Richard B. Alley	The Pennsylvania State University - University Park	2008
Edward Anders (died 2025)	University of Chicago	1974
James G. Anderson	Harvard University	1992
Kinsey A. Anderson (died 2012)	University of California, Berkeley	1980
James R. Arnold (died 2012)	University of California, San Diego	1964
W. Ian Axford (died 2010)	Max Planck Institute for Aeronomy	1983
George Backus	University of California, San Diego	1969
Fran Bagenal	University of Colorado Boulder	2021
David Bercovici	Yale University	2018
Gregory C. Beroza	Stanford University	2022
Francis Birch (died 1992)	Harvard University	1950
Jacques E. Blamont (died 2020)	Centre National d'Etudes Spatiales (CNES)	1980
Geoffrey Blewitt	University of Nevada, Reno	2024
Kristie A. Boering	University of California, Berkeley	2018
Henry G. Booker (died 1988)	University of California, San Diego	1960
Christopher S. Bretherton	Allen Institute for Artificial Intelligence	2019
Harrison Brown (died 1986)	East-West Center	1955
Michael E. Brown	California Institute of Technology	2013
Donald E. Brownlee	University of Washington	1995
Friedrich Busse	University of Bayreuth	1993
Horace R. Byers (died 1998)	Texas A&M University	1952
A. G. W. Cameron (died 2005)	University of Arizona	1976
Mark A. Cane	Lamont-Doherty Earth Observatory of Columbia University	2013
Robin M. Canup	Southwest Research Institute	2012
Anny Cazenave	Centre National d'Etudes Spatiales (CNES)	2008
Joseph W. Chamberlain (died 2004)	Rice University	1965
Dudley B. Chelton	Oregon State University	2022
Ulrich Christensen	Max Planck Institute for Solar System Research	2021
Ralph J. Cicerone (died 2016)	National Academy of Sciences	1990
Robert N. Clayton (died 2017)	The University of Chicago	1996
Charles S. Cox (died 2015)	University of California, San Diego	1996
Harmon Craig (died 2003)	University of California, San Diego	1979
Eric A. D’Asaro	University of Washington	2014
Francis A. Dahlen Jr. (died 2007)	Princeton University	2000
Nicolas Dauphas	The University of Hong Kong	2024
Russ E. Davis (died 2022)	University of California, San Diego	1988
Véronique M. Dehant	Royal Observatory of Belgium	2023
Clara Deser	National Center for Atmospheric Research	2021
Thomas M. Donahue (died 2004)	University of Michigan	1983
Adam M. Dziewonski (died 2016)	Harvard University	1995
Göran Ekström	Columbia University	2019
Arnt Eliassen (died 2000)	University of Oslo	1991
Walter M. Elsasser (died 1991)	Johns Hopkins University	1957
Kerry A. Emanuel	Massachusetts Institute of Technology	2007
Samuel Epstein (died 2001)	California Institute of Technology	1977
Julio A. Fernández	Universidad de la Republica	2016
Barbara J. Finlayson-Pitts	University of California, Irvine	2006
Lennard A. Fisk	University of Michigan	2003
Scott Forbush (died 1984)	Carnegie Institution of Washington	1962
Qiang Fu	University of Washington	2024
Dave Fultz (died 2002)	The University of Chicago	1975
Inez Y. Fung	University of California, Berkeley	2001
Stephen A. Fuselier	Southwest Research Institute	2021
Christopher J. R. Garrett	University of Victoria	2006
Johannes Geiss (died 2020)	International Space Science Institute	1978
Freeman Gilbert (died 2014)	University of California, San Diego	1973
Gary A. Glatzmaier	University of California, Santa Cruz	2010
George Gloeckler	University of Michigan	1997
T. Gold (died 2004)	Cornell University	1968
Peter Goldreich	California Institute of Technology	1972
Richard M. Goody (died 2023)	Harvard University	1970
William E. Gordon (died 2010)	No affiliation	1968
Ross Gunn (died 1966)	American University	1951
Donald A. Gurnett (died 2022)	The University of Iowa	1998
Beno Gutenberg (died 1960)	California Institute of Technology	1945
Maura E. Hagan	Utah State University	2019
James E. Hansen	Columbia University	1996
Dennis L. Hartmann	University of Washington	2016
Bernhard Haurwitz (died 1986)	Colorado State University	1960
Isaac M. Held	Princeton University	2003
R. A. Helliwell (died 2011)	Stanford University	1967
Don Helmberger (died 2020)	California Institute of Technology	2004
James R. Holton (died 2004)	University of Washington	1994
Brian John Hoskins	University of Reading	2002
Donald M. Hunten (died 2010)	University of Arizona	1981
Mark G. Inghram (died 2003)	The University of Chicago	1961
Harold Jeffreys (died 1989)	University of Cambridge	1945
Catherine L. Johnson	University of British Columbia	2023
Jack R. Jokipii (died 2022)	University of Arizona	2001
Hiroo Kanamori	California Institute of Technology	2012
Joseph Kaplan (died 1991)	University of California, Los Angeles	1957
William M. Kaula (died 2000)	University of California, Los Angeles	1987
Charles D. Keeling (died 2005)	University of California, San Diego	1994
V. I. Keilis-Borok (died 2013)	Russian Academy of Sciences	1971
Charles F. Kennel	University of California, San Diego	1991
Margaret G. Kivelson	University of California, Los Angeles	1999
Leon Knopoff (died 2011)	University of California, Los Angeles	1963
Devendra Lal (died 2012)	University of California, San Diego	1975
Rosine Lallement	Centre National de la Recherche Scientifique	2003
Kurt Lambeck	Australian National University	2009
Kristine M. Larson	Central Washington University	2020
Thorne Lay	University of California, Santa Cruz	2014
Xavier T. Le Pichon (died 2025)	Collège de France	1995
Judith L. Lean	Naval Research Laboratory	2003
Douglas K. Lilly (died 2018)	University of Oklahoma	1999
Robert P. Lin (died 2012)	University of California, Berkeley	2006
Richard S. Lindzen	Massachusetts Institute of Technology	1977
Dana W. Longcope	Montana State University	2022
Michael S. Longuet-Higgins (died 2016)	University of California, San Diego	1979
Edward N. Lorenz (died 2008)	Massachusetts Institute of Technology	1975
Jonathan I. Lunine	NASA Jet Propulsion Laboratory	2010
Gordon J. MacDonald (died 2002)	International Institute for Applied Systems Analysis	1962
Renu Malhotra	University of Arizona	2015
Willem V. R. Malkus (died 2016)	Massachusetts Institute of Technology	1972
Syukuro Manabe	Princeton University	1990
William H. Matthaeus	University of Delaware	2025
Frank B. McDonald (died 2012)	University of Maryland, College Park	1986
William B. McKinnon	Washington University in St. Louis	2023
James C. McWilliams	University of California, Los Angeles	2002
H. Jay Melosh (died 2020)	University of Arizona	2003
Peter Meyer (died 2002)	The University of Chicago	1989
Jerry X. Mitrovica	Harvard University	2025
Andrei S. Monin (died 2007)	Russian Academy of Sciences	1976
W. Jason Morgan (died 2023)	Harvard University	1982
Walter H. Munk (died 2019)	University of California, San Diego	1956
Takesi Nagata (died 1991)	National Institute of Polar Research (Japan)	1969
Jerome Namias (died 1997)	Scripps Institution of Oceanography	1983
Norman F. Ness (died 2023)	University of Delaware	1983
Edward P. Ney (died 1996)	University of Minnesota	1971
Marcel Nicolet (died 1996)	Royal Belgian Institute for Space Aeronomy	1972
Alfred O. C. Nier (died 1994)	University of Minnesota	1950
William A. Nierenberg (died 2000)	University of California, San Diego	1971
Francis Nimmo	University of California, Santa Cruz	2020
Hans Oeschger (died 1998)	University of Bern	1990
Peter L. Olson	The University of New Mexico	2007
Timothy N. Palmer	University of Oxford	2020
Stanton J. Peale (died 2015)	University of California, Santa Barbara	2009
Joseph Pedlosky	Woods Hole Oceanographic Institution	1985
Chaim L. Pekeris (died 1993)	Weizmann Institute of Science	1952
Gordon H. Pettengill (died 2021)	Massachusetts Institute of Technology	1979
S. George H. Philander	Princeton University	2004
Norman A. Phillips (died 2019)	National Oceanic and Atmospheric Administration	1976
Kimberly Ann Prather	University of California, San Diego	2020
Frank Press (died 2020)	Massachusetts Institute of Technology	1958
P. Buford Price Jr. (died 2021)	University of California, Berkeley	1975
Tuija Pulkkinen	University of Michigan	2014
Veerabhadran Ramanathan	University of California, San Diego	2002
Venkatachalam Ramaswamy	National Oceanic and Atmospheric Administration	2025
A. R. Ravishankara	Colorado State University	2000
Richard J. Reed (died 2008)	University of Washington	1978
Roger Revelle (died 1991)	University of California, San Diego	1957
John H. Reynolds (died 2000)	University of California, Berkeley	1968
Peter B. Rhines	University of Washington	1981
James R. Rice	Harvard University	1981
Eric J. Rignot	University of California, Irvine	2018
A. E. Ringwood (died 1993)	Australian National University	1975
Barbara A. Romanowicz	University of California, Berkeley	2005
Richard Rotunno	National Center for Atmospheric Research	2023
Roald Z. Sagdeev	University of Maryland, College Park	1987
David T. Sandwell	Scripps Institution of Oceanography	2011
Gerald Schubert (died 2025)	University of California, Los Angeles	2002
John G. Sclater (died 2024)	University of California, San Diego	1989
Paul Segall	Stanford University	2016
Peter M. Shearer	University of California, San Diego	2009
John A. Simpson (died 2000)	The University of Chicago	1959
Louis B. Slichter (died 1978)	Massachusetts Institute of Technology	1944
Sean C. Solomon	Columbia University	2000
Susan Solomon	Massachusetts Institute of Technology	1992
Melvin E. Stern (died 2010)	Florida State University	1998
David J. Stevenson	California Institute of Technology	2004
Henry M. Stommel (died 1992)	Woods Hole Oceanographic Institution	1961
Edward C. Stone (died 2024)	California Institute of Technology	1984
Hans E. Suess (died 1993)	University of California, San Diego	1966
Lynne D. Talley	Scripps Institution of Oceanography	2024
Mark H. Thiemens	University of California, San Diego	2006
Margaret A. Tolbert	University of Colorado Boulder	2004
Donald L. Turcotte (died 2025)	University of California, Davis	1986
Karl K. Turekian (died 2013)	Yale University	1984
Seiya Uyeda (died 2023)	Tokai University	1976
James A. Van Allen (died 2006)	University of Iowa	1959
John Verhoogen (died 1993)	University of California, Berkeley	1956
George Veronis (died 2019)	Yale University	1994
John Vidale	University of Southern California	2017
Oswald G. Villard Jr. (died 2004)	SRI International	1958
John M. Wahr (died 2015)	University of Colorado Boulder	2012
Robert M. Walker (died 2004)	Washington University in St. Louis	1973
John M. Wallace	University of Washington	1997
William R. Ward (died 2018)	Southwest Research Institute	2015
G. J. Wasserburg (died 2016)	California Institute of Technology	1971
Benjamin P. Weiss	Massachusetts Institute of Technology	2025
Paul O. Wennberg	California Institute of Technology	2017
George W. Wetherill (died 2006)	Carnegie Institution of Washington	1974
J. Tuzo Wilson (died 1993)	University of Toronto	1968
John R. Winckler (died 2001)	University of Minnesota	1996
Jack L. Wisdom	Massachusetts Institute of Technology	2008
Steven C. Wofsy	Harvard University	2011
John A. Wood	Harvard–Smithsonian Center for Astrophysics	1991
Ronald F. Woodman	Instituto Geofisico del Peru	2007
Oliver R. Wulf (died 1987)	California Institute of Technology	1949
Carl Wunsch	Massachusetts Institute of Technology	1978
William R. Young	University of California, San Diego	2012
Gary P. Zank	The University of Alabama in Huntsville	2016
Maria T. Zuber	Massachusetts Institute of Technology	2004
