= Charles A. Whitten Medal =

American award for research in geophysics

The Charles A. Whitten Medal was established by the American Geophysical Union to honor Charles A. Whitten for his contributions to research in crustal movements, such as plate tectonics. This medal, which was first awarded to Whitten, recognizes outstanding achievement in research on the form and dynamics of the Earth and planets. The medal is given no more than every other year.

Charles A. Whitten Medal Winners
Year	Name
1985	Charles A. Whitten
1987	William M. Kaula
1989	James C. Savage
1991	Irwin Shapiro
1993	Kurt Lambeck
1995	Donald L. Turcotte
1997	Gordon Pettengill
1999	Richard I. Walcott
2001	Byron D. Tapley
2004	Wayne Thatcher
2006	John M. Wahr
2008	Charles C. Counselman III
2010	W. R. Peltier
2012	David E. Smith
2014	Paul Segall
2016	Véronique Dehant
2018	David Sandwell
2020	Kristine M. Larson
2022	Roger Bilham
2024	Srinivas V. Bettadpur

== See also ==
- List of geodesists
- List of geophysicists
- List of geophysics awards
- Prizes named after people
