= Raymond Roble =

Raymond Roble is an American scientist. He won an Arctowski medal and a William Bowie Medal. His academic work, according to Guy Brasseur, has "revolutionized the field[s]" of "upper atmospheric physics, chemistry, and dynamics".
