= Sabine Schindler =

German astrophysicist

Sabine Schindler (born 24 March 1961) is a German astrophysicist whose research has involved both simulations and X-ray observations of galaxy clusters. She is a professor at the University of Innsbruck and rector of UMIT - Private University for Health Sciences, Medical Informatics and Technology, both in Austria.

== Education and career ==
Schindler earned a diploma in physics at the University of Erlangen–Nuremberg in 1987, and completed a doctorate (Dr. rer. nat.) in physics at LMU Munich in 1992. While a doctoral student, she also worked as a researcher at the Max Planck Institute of Quantum Optics, Max Planck Institute for Astrophysics, and Max Planck Institute for Extraterrestrial Physics.

After postdoctoral research supported by the Humboldt Foundation at the University of California, Santa Cruz and Lick Observatory, and continued work as a researcher at the Max Planck Institute for Extraterrestrial Physics and Liverpool John Moores University, she became a full professor at the University of Innsbruck in 2002. There, she directed the Institute for Astro- and Particle Physics from 2004 to 2012, and served as vice rector for research from 2014 to 2017.

While maintaining her affiliation at Innsbruck, Schindler has been rector of UMIT - Private University for Health Sciences, Medical Informatics and Technology since 2014. She has announced her plans to retire as rector in 2020 in order to devote more time to her research, supported by a fellowship from the Swiss-based International Space Science Institute.

== Recognition ==
Schindler became a corresponding member of the Austrian Academy of Sciences in 2006, and has been a full member since 2010. She was elected to the International Academy of Astronautics in 2013.
