= James McWilliams =

James McWilliams may refer to:

- James E. McWilliams (born 1968), professor of history
- James C. McWilliams, professor of oceanic and atmospheric modeling
