= Boering =

Boering is a surname. Notable people with the surname include:

- Hellen Boering (born 1964), Dutch-born water polo goalkeeper
- Kristie Boering, Professor of Earth and Planetary Science at UC Berkeley
