= Richard Montgomery Field =

American geophysicist (1885–1961)

Field, as president of the Union, awarding the first Bowie Medal to William Bowie in 1939.

Richard Montgomery Field (1885 – 1961) was an American geophysicist who served as the 8th president of the American Geophysical Union. He organized the International Summer School of Geology and Natural Resources at Princeton University.

He attended Boston Latin School and then Harvard University, where he earned a bachelor's degree in geology and mining engineering (1910) and a Ph.D. in paleontology (1918).

He taught at Brown University and Massachusetts Institute of Technology. He was a professor of geology at Princeton University from 1923 to 1950.

== Honors and awards ==
Field won a William Bowie Medal in 1954, after which he joked to his student Harry Hammond Hess that that was "the nicest thing that had happened" to him after winning the hundred-yard dash in high school.
