= Wayne Thatcher =

Wayne Thatcher is an American geodesist who worked at the United States Geological Survey for over fifty years. He won a Charles A. Whitten Medal from the American Geophysical Union in 2004 for his "outstanding achievement in research on the form and dynamics of the Earth".
