= Daniel N. Baker =

American space scientist (born 1947)

- Born: 1947 (age 78–79)
- Education: University of Iowa (B.A. Physics/Math, 1969) (M.S. Space Physics, 1973) (Ph.D. Space Physics, 1974)
- Awards: National Academy of Engineering (2010); William Bowie Medal (2018)
- Scientific career
- Fields: Astrophysics
- Workplaces: University of Colorado Boulder
- Thesis: Energetic particle fluxes and spectra in the Jovian magnetosphere (1974)
- Website: phys.colorado.edu/people/baker-daniel-0

Daniel N. Baker (born 1947) is an American space scientist. He is the Distinguished Professor of Astrophysical and Planetary Science at the University of Colorado Boulder and director of the Laboratory for Atmospheric and Space Physics. He received his B.A. from the University of Iowa in 1969 and his Ph.D. from the same institution in 1974. In 2010 he was elected to the National Academy of Engineering for "leadership in studies, measurements, and predictive tools for the Earth's radiation environment and its impact on U.S. security." He has been a researcher for several NASA missions, such as MESSENGER and the Van Allen Probes, and he served as the chair of the committee that wrote the 2012 Solar and Space Physics Decadal Survey. He currently serves as the Director of the Colorado Space Policy Center.

== See also ==
- Space weather
- Rare events
