= Kris Deschouwer =

Kris Deschouwer is a Belgian political scientist and emeritus professor at the Vrije Universiteit Brussel. He was a member of the Coudenberg group, a Belgian federalist think tank. His research is on the consequences of the institutional complexity of Belgium for political actors and for political parties in particular.

== Education ==
He obtained a master's degree in Sociology and in Political Science at the Vrije Universiteit Brussel in 1981 and in 1987, he obtained a PhD in Political Science.

== Career ==
He started his career at the VUB in 1988, where he has been teaching general introduction to political science, comparative politics, Belgian politics and parties and elections. In 1999, he was a research fellow at the European University Institute in Florence. From 1987 until 1993, he was associate professor at the Department of Comparative Politics of the University of Bergen. In 2004, he held the Chaire d'honneur de la ville de Lausanne at the University of Lausanne. Between 2003 and 2009, he was co-editor of the European Journal of Political Research.

== Select publications ==
- Kris Deschouwer, Pascal Delwit, Marc Hooghe, Stefaan Walgrave (eds), Les voix du peuple. Le comportement électoral au scrutin du 10 juin 2009, Bruxelles, Editions de l'Université de Bruxelles, 2010.
