= Donald L. Turcotte =

American university teacher (1932–2025)

Donald Turcotte
- Born: April 22, 1932; Bellingham, Washington, U.S.
- Died: February 4, 2025 (aged 92); Davis, California, U.S.
- Education: Caltech (BS, 1954); Cornell University (MAeroEng, 1955); Caltech (PhD, 1958)
- Known for: Geophysics
- Awards: Arthur L. Day Medal(1981); Charles A. Whitten Medal (1995); William Bowie Medal (2002)
- Scientific career
- Workplaces: Cornell; UC Davis
- Thesis: An Experimental Investigation of Flame Stabilization in a Heated Turbulent Boundary Layer
- Doctoral advisor: Frank E. Marble
- Notable students: Louise Kellogg, E Marc Parmentier, Bruce Malamud, Cheryl Fillekes

Donald Lawson Turcotte (April 22, 1932 – February 4, 2025) was an American geophysicist most noted for his work on the boundary layer theory of mantle convection as part of the theory of plate tectonics. He worked at Cornell University then the University of California, Davis.

== Life and career ==
Turcotte trained as an engineer and earned a PhD in aeronautics and physics from the California Institute of Technology (Caltech) in 1958. After a year at the Naval Postgraduate School in Monterey, Turcotte took up a position at Cornell University, in the graduate school of Aeronautical Engineering. In 1965, Turcotte took a sabbatical at the University of Oxford, in the engineering department. Here he met Ron Oxburgh, who had recently arrived in the Department of Geology, and they began a collaboration in which they developed ideas about convective flow in the Earth's mantle, and its links to the newly emerging ideas of plate tectonics. In 1973, Turcotte moved to the geology department at Cornell where he worked for the next thirty years. After retiring from Cornell in 2003, Turcotte moved to University of California, Davis.

He has won awards including the Arthur L. Day Medal of the Geological Society of America, the William Bowie Medal and the Charles A. Whitten Medal of the American Geophysical Union. He was a member of the National Academy of Sciences.

In 2008, the American Geophysical Union's Nonlinear Geophysics committee established the Donald L. Turcotte Award, which is given annually to one honoree "in recognition of outstanding dissertation research that contributes directly to nonlinear geophysics."

Turcotte died on February 4, 2025, at the age of 92.

== Books ==
- Donald L. Turcotte and Gerald Schubert, Geodynamics, Cambridge University Press, Third Edition (2014), ISBN 978-1-107-00653-9 (Hardback) ISBN 978-0-521-18623-0 (Paperback)
- Donald L. Turcotte, Fractals and chaos in geology and geophysics, Cambridge University Press, 1997
- Gerald Schubert, Donald L. Turcotte, and Peter Olson, Mantle convection in the Earth and planets, Cambridge University Press, 2001
