= George P. Woollard =

George Prior "Doc" Woollard (1908–1979) was an American geologist who served as president of the American Geophysical Union and directed the Hawaii Institute of Geophysics. He won a William Bowie Medal and had the George P. Woollard Award of the Geological Society of America named after him. Woollard was named a fellow of the American Association for the Advancement of Science in 1966.
