= David Smith (geophysicist) =

David E. Smith was an American geodesist. He worked at NASA's Goddard Space Flight Center and Crustal Dynamics Project. He won the Charles A. Whitten Medal in 2012. He is a fellow of the American Geophysical Union.
