= Charles A. Whitten =

American geodesist (1909–1994)

Charles Arthur Whitten (died 1994) was an American geodecist. He had the Charles A. Whitten Medal named after him by the American Geophysical Union in 1984, and received a William Bowie medal in 1980.
