= Malkus waterwheel =

Mechanical model that exhibits chaotic dynamics

Computer simulation of two Malkus waterwheels with unequal initial conditions. Although the initial angle $\theta_0$ differs between the wheels by only 1 degree, the trajectories of the plotted centers of mass diverge enormously in the long run.

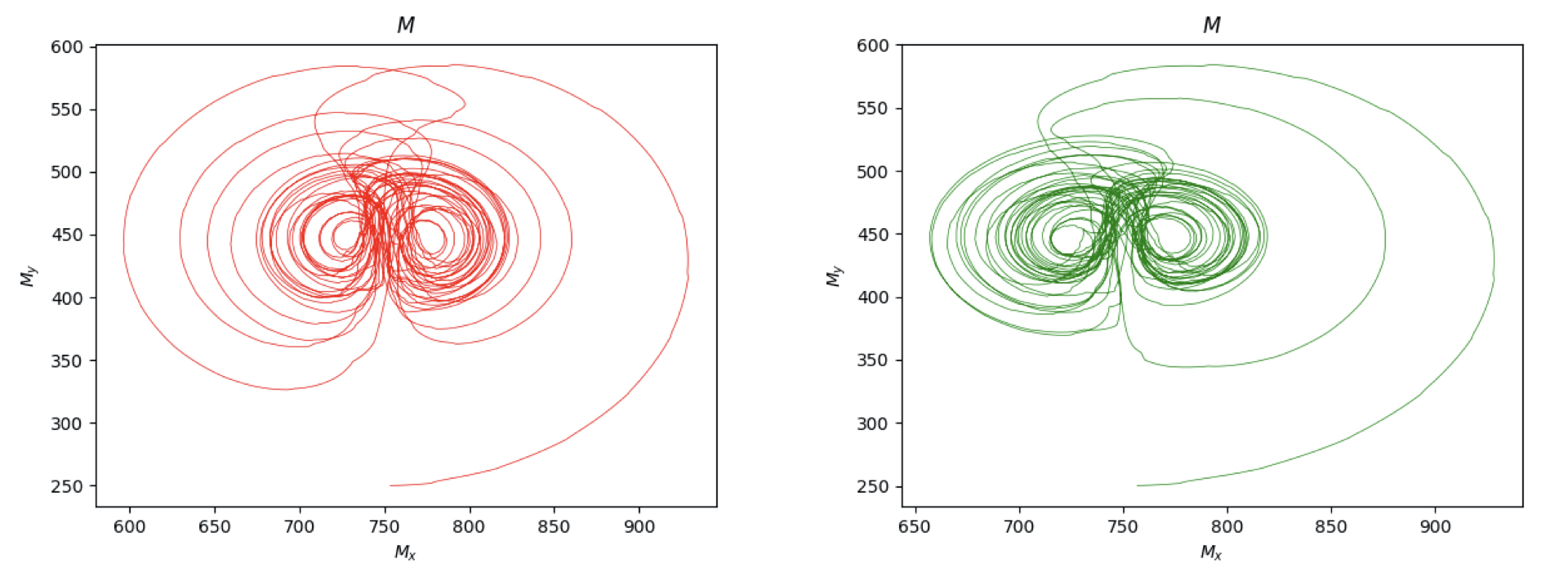
Plots of the trajectories of the centers of mass of the above two wheels, left and right respectively, after the same extended period. In each plot, the center of mass $M\in\mathbb{R}^2$ is the vector $(M_x, M_y)^T$, where $M_x$ and $M_y$ are the $x$ and $y$ components, respectively. The system indeed appears to exhibit a great dependence on initial conditions, a defining property of chaotic systems; moreover, two attractors of the system are seen in both plots.

The Malkus waterwheel, also referred to as the Lorenz waterwheel or chaotic waterwheel, is a mechanical model that exhibits chaotic dynamics. Its motion is governed by the Lorenz equations. While classical waterwheels rotate in one direction at a constant speed, the Malkus waterwheel exhibits chaotic motion where its rotation will speed up, slow down, stop, change directions, and oscillate back and forth between combinations of such behaviours in an unpredictable manner.

This variant waterwheel was developed by Willem Malkus in the 1960s. As a pedagogic tool, the Malkus waterwheel became a paradigmatic realization of a chaotic system, and is widely used in the teaching of chaos theory.

In addition to its pedagogic use, the Malkus waterwheel has been actively studied by researchers in dynamical systems and chaos.

In the Malkus waterwheel, a constant flow of water pours in at the top bucket of a simple circular symmetrical waterwheel and the base of each bucket is perforated to allow the outflow of water. At low rates of inflow, the wheel rolls permanently in the same direction. At higher rates of inflow, the waterwheel enters a chaotic regime where it reverses its directionality, accelerates and decelerates in an apparently unpredictable way. A further increase in the incoming flow makes the waterwheel return to a periodic state, where it oscillates back and forth at fixed intervals. Since it was first proposed, many experimental and real-world applications have been related to the waterwheel dynamics. These include instances like the dynamics for electro-rotation, haline oceanic flow, and Rayleigh–Benard convection.
