= Syun-iti Akimoto =

Japanese geophysicist (1925–2004)

Syun-iti Akimoto (1925–2004) was a Japanese geophysicist. He was described by an Eos article as a "a pioneer of high-pressure, high-temperature study of the materials of the Earth's deep interior". He had the 39th volume of the Geophysical Monograph Series dedicated to his honor. He received a Japan Academy Prize and a William Bowie medal.
