= Dick Walcott =

New Zealand geologist

- Born: c.1933
- Education: Victoria University of Wellington
- Awards: Hector Medal (1993); Charles A. Whitten Medal (1999)
- Scientific career
- Workplaces: Victoria University of Wellington
- Thesis: Structure and Petrology of the Red Hill Complex, Nelson (1965)

Richard Irving Walcott FRS (born c.1933) is a New Zealand geologist known for his work on plate tectonics.

Walcott studied at Victoria University College, graduating with a BSc in 1962. He then completed his PhD at Victoria University of Wellington in 1965, with a thesis on the Red Hill Complex at Nelson, and was awarded a DSc by thesis from the same institution in 1981. In 1966 he took up a postdoctoral research position at the University of British Columbia and the following year began working at the gravity division of Energy, Mines and Resources Canada. He returned to New Zealand in 1975, became professor of geology at Victoria in 1983, retired in 1999, and was granted the title of emeritus professor.

He was elected a Fellow of the Royal Society of New Zealand in 1982, and a Fellow of the Royal Society in 1991. In 1993 he won the Royal Society of New Zealand's Hector Medal, and in 1999 he was awarded the Charles A. Whitten Medal by the American Geophysical Union.

The Walcott Névé in the Ross Dependency was named for Walcott by the northern party of the New Zealand Geological Survey Antarctic Expedition in 1961–62, of which he was the leader.
