= Charles C. Counselman III =

Charles C. Counselman III is an American geodesist best known for his research and development of GPS receivers. He is a fellow of the American Geophysical Union and a recipient of a Charles A. Whitten Medal. One of his receivers has been displayed at the Deutches Museum.
