= Solar Wind Composition Experiment =

Star ejecta measuring device deployed during the Apollo Moon landings

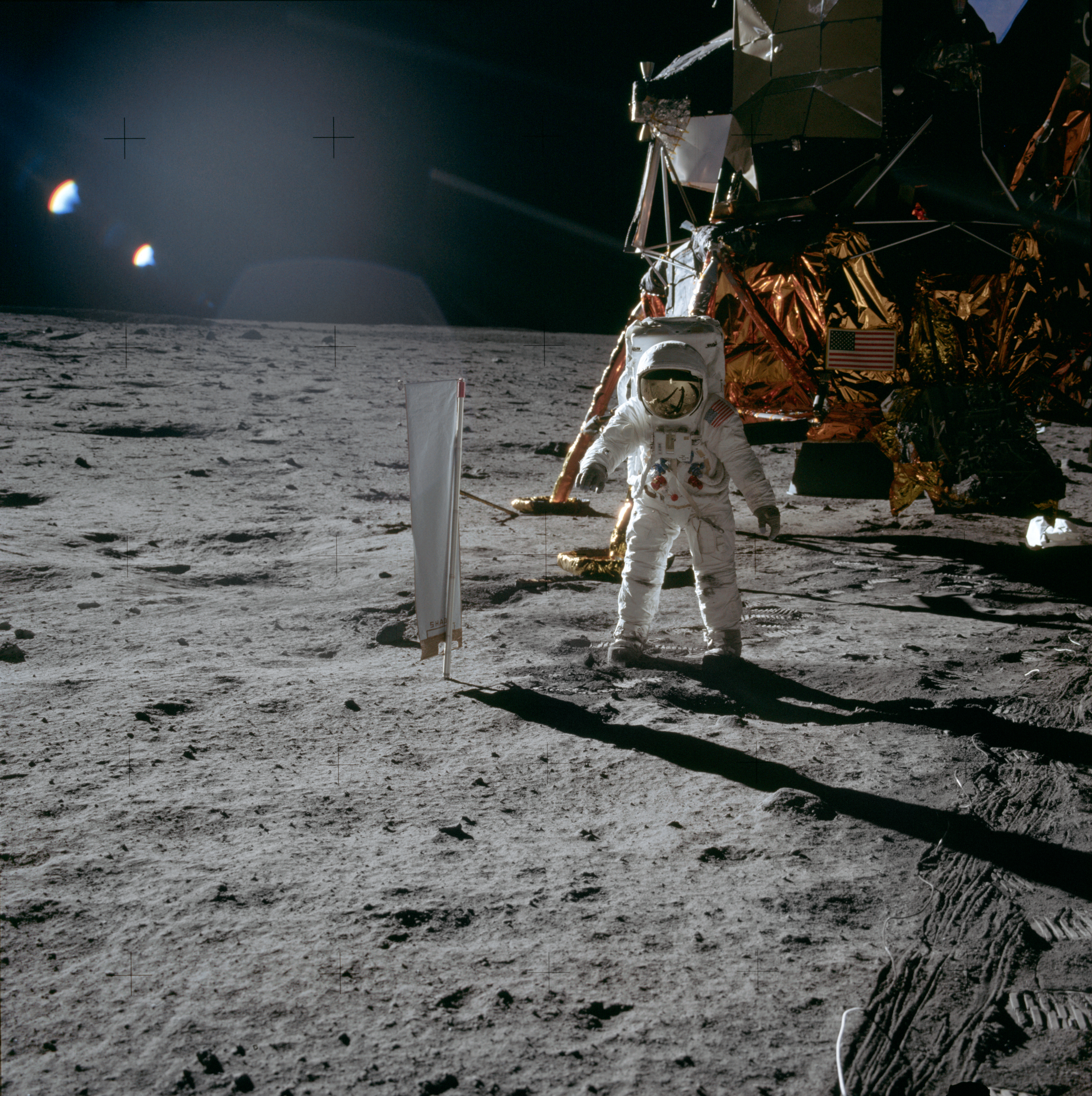
Astronaut Edwin E. Aldrin standing next to the deployed Solar Wind Composition Experiment during the Apollo 11 mission. The SWC was nicknamed the 'Swiss flag' experiment.

The Solar Wind Composition Experiment (SWC) was an experiment deployed on the Moon during the Apollo program (Apollo 11, 12, 14, 15 and 16). The aim was to measure and sample the solar wind outside the Earth's magnetosphere. It was the first definitive isotopic measurements of solar material.

The SWC was proposed and designed by a Swiss team headed by Johannes Geiss and Peter Eberhardt of the University of Bern and Peter Signer of the Swiss Institute of Technology. It was manufactured by the Swiss National Science Foundation and the University of Bern. The experiment was partially funded by the Swiss Government.

The SWC experiment consisted of a 1 ft × 4.6 ft (0.30 m × 1.40 m) sheet of ultra-pure aluminum foils (also with platinum metal segments on the last Apollo 16 experiment) erected on the Moon's surface with a telescopic pole. The sheet was to be exposed to the Sun as to measure the ion types and energies of the solar wind on the lunar surface. The time exposure was 77 minutes on Apollo 11, 18 hours and 42 minutes on Apollo 12, 21 hours on Apollo 14, 41 hours and 8 minutes on Apollo 15, and 45 hours and 5 minutes on Apollo 16. At the end of the exposure the foil was detached from the telescopic pole, placed in a Teflon bag, and brought back to Earth for analysis. The experiment was successful and provided accurate He, Ne and Ar isotopic compositions of the solar wind.
