= James L. Burch =

James L. Burch is an American physicist. He was the principal investigator at NASA's IMAGE mission, and was later awarded the NASA Distinguished Service Medal. He won a 2021 William Bowie Medal from the American Geophysical Union, of which he is a fellow.
