= William Bowie Medal =

Geophysics award

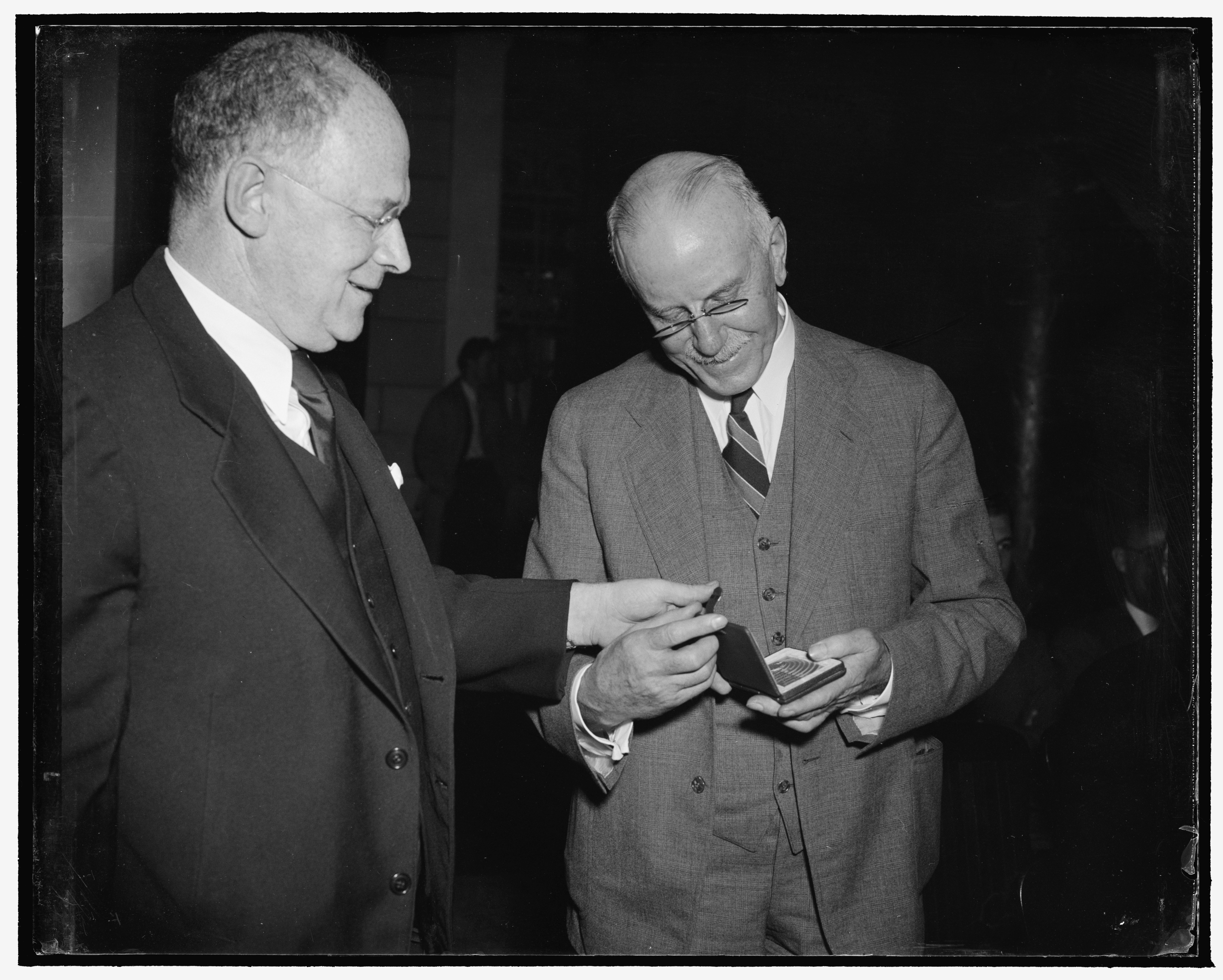
Richard M. Field, President of the American Geophysical Union awards William Bowie with the first Bowie Medal, 1939

The William Bowie Medal is awarded annually by the American Geophysical Union for "outstanding contributions to fundamental geophysics and for unselfish cooperation in research". The award is the highest honor given by the AGU and is named in honor of William Bowie, one of the co-founders of the Union.

== Past recipients ==
Source: AGU

- 1939 William Bowie
- 1940 Arthur Louis Day
- 1941 John Adam Fleming
- 1942 Nicholas Hunter Heck
- 1943 Oscar Edward Meinzer
- 1944 Henry Bryant Bigelow
- 1945 Jacob Aall Bonnevie Bjerknes
- 1946 Reginald Aldworth Daly
- 1947 Felix Andries Vening Meinesz
- 1948 James B. Macelwane
- 1949 Walter Davis Lambert
- 1950 Leason Heberling Adams
- 1951 Harald Ulrik Sverdrup
- 1952 Harold Jeffreys
- 1953 Beno Gutenberg
- 1954 Richard Montgomery Field
- 1955 Walter Hermann Bucher
- 1956 Weikko Aleksanteri Heiskanen
- 1957 William Maurice Ewing
- 1958 Johannes Theodoor Thijsse
- 1959 Walter M. Elsasser
- 1960 Francis Birch
- 1961 Keith Edward Bullen
- 1962 Sydney Chapman
- 1963 Merle Antony Tuve
- 1964 Julius Bartels
- 1965 Hugo Benioff
- 1966 Louis B. Slichter
- 1967 Lloyd Berkner
- 1968 Roger Revelle
- 1969 Walter B. Langbein
- 1970 Bernhard Haurwitz
- 1971 Inge Lehmann
- 1972 Carl Eckart
- 1973 George P. Woollard
- 1974 A.E. Ringwood
- 1975 Edward Bullard
- 1976 Jule G. Charney
- 1977 James A. Van Allen
- 1978 Helmut E. Landsberg
- 1979 Frank Press
- 1980 Charles A. Whitten
- 1981 Herbert Friedman
- 1982 Henry M. Stommel
- 1983 Syun-iti Akimoto
- 1984 Marcel Nicolet
- 1985 H. William Menard
- 1986 James Dooge
- 1987 Robert N. Clayton
- 1988 Hannes Alfven
- 1989 Walter H. Munk
- 1990 Eugene N. Parker
- 1991 Don L. Anderson
- 1992 Alfred O. Nier
- 1993 Irwin I. Shapiro
- 1994 Peter S. Eagleson
- 1995 Claude Allègre
- 1996 Eugene Shoemaker
- 1997 Raymond Hide
- 1998 Richard M. Goody
- 1999 J. Freeman Gilbert
- 2000 John Alexander Simpson
- 2001 Dan McKenzie
- 2002 Adam M. Dziewonski
- 2003 Donald L. Turcotte
- 2004 Keiiti Aki
- 2005 Johannes Geiss
- 2006 Carl Wunsch
- 2007 Susan Solomon
- 2008 Gerald J. Wasserburg
- 2009 Ignacio Rodriguez-Iturbe
- 2010 Syukuro Manabe
- 2011 Louis J. Lanzerotti
- 2012 Anny Cazenave
- 2013 Raymond Roble
- 2014 Hiroo Kanamori
- 2015 Wilfried H. Brutsaert
- 2016 Stanley Robert Hart
- 2017 did not award
- 2018 Daniel N. Baker
- 2019 Barbara Romanowicz
- 2020 Rita Colwell
- 2021 James L. Burch
- 2022 David J. Stevenson
- 2023 William E. Dietrich
- 2024 Michael McElroy
- 2025 Soroosh Sorooshian

== See also ==
- List of geophysicists
- List of geophysics awards
- List of prizes named after people
