= List of educational programmes at the Vrije Universiteit Brussel =

The Vrije Universiteit Brussel offers educational programmes leading to bachelor's, master's, master after master's, and doctoral degrees.

== Bachelor's Programmes ==
The programmes marked with (United Kingdom) are taught in English.

- Adult Educational Sciences
- Applied Economics
- Biology
- Bioengineering Sciences
- Biomedical Sciences
- Business Economics (United Kingdom)
- Business Engineering
- Business Management
- Chemistry
- Communication Studies
- Computer Sciences
- Criminology
- Pharmaceutical Sciences
- Physics
- Medicine
- Geography
- History
- Applied Sciences and Engineering
- Applied Sciences and Engineering: Architecture
- Art Sciences and Archaeology
- Physical Education and Movement Science
- Political Sciences
- Psychology
- Law
- Rehabilitation Sciences and Physiotherapy
- Social Sciences (United Kingdom)
- Sociology
- Linguistics and Literature
- Philosophy and Ethics
- Mathematics

== Master's Programmes ==
A bachelor's degree is typically required for admission to a master's programme. All programmes are taught in Dutch; the programmes marked with (United Kingdom) are also taught in English.

- Faculty of Science
  - Biology
  - Chemistry
  - Physics
  - Geography
  - Applied Sciences and Engineering: Computer Science (United Kingdom)
  - Applied Informactics
  - Bioscience Engineering: Cell and Gene Biotechnology
  - Bioscience Engineering: Chemistry and Bioprocess Technology
  - Mathematics
  - Molecular Biology (United Kingdom)
  - Biomolecular Sciences (United Kingdom)
  - UNICA Euromaster in Urban Studies (4CITIES) (United Kingdom)
- Faculty of Engineering
  - Safety Engineering
  - Applied Sciences and Engineering: Architectural Engineering (United Kingdom)
  - Applied Sciences and Engineering: Biomedical Engineering (United Kingdom)
  - Applied Sciences and Engineering: Civil Engineering (United Kingdom)
  - Applied Sciences and Engineering: Electronics and Information Technology (United Kingdom)
  - Applied Sciences and Engineering: Photonics (United Kingdom)
  - Applied Sciences and Engineering: Chemical and Materials Engineering (United Kingdom)
  - Applied Sciences and Engineering: Applied Computer Science (United Kingdom)
  - Applied Sciences and Engineering: Electro-Mechanical Engineering (United Kingdom)
  - Applied Sciences and Engineering: Computer Science (United Kingdom)
  - Physical Land Resources (United Kingdom)
  - Water Resources Engineering (United Kingdom)
  - Erasmus Mundus Master of Science In Photonics (United Kingdom)
  - Master of Water Resources Engineering (United Kingdom)
- Faculty of Medicine and Pharmacy
  - Biomedical Sciences
  - Pharmacy
  - Drug Development
  - Medicine
  - Master in Management, Care and Policy in Gerontology
  - Management and Policy in Health Care
  - Nursing and Obstetrics
- Faculty of Social Sciences & Solvay Business School
  - Communication Studies: Journalism and Media in Europe (United Kingdom)
  - Communication Studies: New Media and Society in Europe (United Kingdom)
  - Sociology
  - Political Science
  - Solvay Master of Management (United Kingdom)
  - Solvay Master of Business Economics
  - Solvay Master Business Engineering
  - Solvay Master Business Engineering: Business & Technology (United Kingdom)
  - Solvay Master of International Business (United Kingdom)
- Faculty of Psychology and Educational Sciences
  - Adult Educational Sciences
  - Educational Sciences (United Kingdom)
  - Psychology
- Faculty of Physical Education and Physiotherapy
  - Physical Education and Movement Sciences
  - Rehabilitation Sciences and Physiotherapy
- Faculty of Law and Criminology
  - Criminology
  - Law
- Faculty of Arts and Philosophy
  - History
  - Art Sciences and Archaeology
  - Linguistics and Literature: two languages (Dutch, English, German, French, Spanish, Italian and Latin)
  - Philosophy and Ethics
  - Information and Library Sciences

== Master After Master's Programmes ==
A master's degree is typically required for admission to a master after master's programme. All programmes are taught in English.

- Faculty of Law and Criminology (United Kingdom)
  - Master of International and Comparative Law (PILC) (United Kingdom)

- Faculty of Economic, Social and Political Sciences and Solvay Business school
  - Master of European Urban Cultures (POLIS) (United Kingdom)
  - Erasmus Mundus Master of Economics of International Trade and European Integration (United Kingdom)
  - Master of European Integration & Development (United Kingdom)

- Faculty of Science
  - Master of Computer Science (United Kingdom)

- Faculty of Engineering
  - Master of Nuclear Engineering (United Kingdom)
- Faculty of Arts and Philosophy
  - Master of Advanced Studies in Linguistics (United Kingdom)

== Doctoral Programmes ==
A master's degree is typically required for admission to a doctoral programme.

- Philosophy (United Kingdom)
- Ethics (United Kingdom)
- Linguistics (United Kingdom)
- Literature (United Kingdom)
- Roman Languages (United Kingdom)
- Germanic Languages (United Kingdom)
- Classics (United Kingdom)
- History (United Kingdom)
- Archaeology en Arts Sciences (United Kingdom)
- Law (United Kingdom)
- Notary (United Kingdom)
- Criminology (United Kingdom)
- Psychology (United Kingdom)
- Pedagogical Sciences (United Kingdom)
- Economical Sciences (United Kingdom)
- Applied Economical Sciences (United Kingdom)
- Business Management (United Kingdom)
- Political Sciences (United Kingdom)
- Social Sciences (United Kingdom)
- Communication Sciences (United Kingdom)
- Medical-Social Sciences (United Kingdom)
- Gerontology (United Kingdom)
- Physical Education (United Kingdom)
- Physiotherapy (United Kingdom)
- Sciences (United Kingdom)
- Engineering (United Kingdom)
- Bio-engineering (United Kingdom)
- Medicine (United Kingdom)
- Dentistry (United Kingdom)
- Pharmaceutical Sciences (United Kingdom)
- Biomedical Sciences (United Kingdom)
