= Srinivas V. Bettadpur =

Srinivas V Bettadpur is a geophysicist who has worked at NASA's GRACE project. He is a fellow of the International Association of Geodesy, the International Association of Geodesy and the American Institute of Aeronautics and Astronautics. Bettadpur won a NASA Exceptional Public Achievement Medal in 2018 and a Charles A. Whitten Medal in 2024.
