= International Space Science Institute =

Institute based in Bern, Switzerland

The International Space Science Institute (ISSI) is an Institute of Advanced Studies based in Bern, Switzerland. The institute's work is interdisciplinary, focusing on the study of the Solar System, and encompasses planetary sciences, astrophysics, cosmology, astrobiology, and the Earth sciences. A main activity is the interpretation of experimental data collected by space research missions. ISSI provides various scientific opportunities, such as funding for International Teams and Workshops, to space scientists around the globe to meet and collaborate. With the Johannes Geiss Fellowship, it supports established international scientists to make further demonstrable contributions to Space Science.

ISSI is a non-profit organization and a foundation under Swiss law. ISSI operations are supported by grants from the European Space Agency, the Swiss Confederation and the Swiss Academy of Sciences (SCNAT). The University of Bern contributes through a grant to a Director and in-kind facilities.

It was established in 1995. Primary initial capital for the ISSI at the time was provided by Oerlikon Contraves, which later became Beyond Gravity.

== Johannes Geiss Fellowship ==
In 2015, ISSI introduced The Johannes Geiss Fellowship (after physicist Johannes Geiss) for international scientists of stature to make demonstrable contributions to the ISSI mission.

=== Johannes Geiss Fellows ===
- 2015: George Gloeckler (University of Michigan, USA)
- 2016: Kurt Lambeck (Australian National University, Australia)
- 2017: Gary Zank (University of Alabama, USA)
- 2018: Karel Schrijver (Lockheed Martin, Palo Alto, USA (retired))
- 2019: Bruno Leibundgut (European Southern Observatory, Garching, Germany)
- 2020: Weiqing Han (University of Colorado at Boulder, USA) and Sabine Schindler, (University of Innsbruck, Austria)
- 2022: Marco Velli (Space Physics at the Earth, Planetary and Space Sciences Department, University of California, USA)
- 2023: Sandra Chapman (Physics Department, University of Warwick, United Kingdom)
- 2024: Michael R. Meyer (University of Michigan, USA)
- 2025: Benjamin Poulter (NASA Goddard Space Flight Center, USA)
- 2026: Claire Nichols (University of Oxford, United Kingdom)
