= Vrije Universiteit Brussel =

Dutch-speaking university in Brussels, Belgium

Coordinates: 50.82242°N 4.39573°E

- Seal of the VUB
- Latin: Universitas Bruxellensis (Note: lit. 'University of Brussels'. (This Latin name is also used by other institutions, including the Université libre de Bruxelles.))
- Motto: Scientia vincere tenebras (Latin)
- Motto in English: Conquering darkness through science
- Type: Independent (partly state-funded)
- Established: 28 May 1970; 56 years ago
- Affiliations: University Association Brussels, UNICA, T.I.M.E.
- President: Karsten De Clerck
- Rector: Jan Danckaert
- Administrative staff: 4,061 (2024)
- Students: 24,199 (2024–2025)
- Location: Pleinlaan 2, 1050 Elsene, Brussels, Belgium
- Campus: Elsene, Jette, Anderlecht and Gooik
- Follows: Free University of Brussels
- Colours: Orange and blue
- Website: www.vub.be/en

The Vrije Universiteit Brussel (Dutch: [ˈvrɛiə ʔynivɛrsiˈtɛid ˈbrʏsəl]; lit. 'Free University of Brussels'; abbreviated VUB) is a Dutch-speaking (Note: It also offers a number of programmes in English.) research university in Brussels, Belgium. (Note: It is one of the five universities officially recognised by the Flemish government. A register of all official institutes of higher education in Flanders is maintained by the Flemish government.) It has four campuses: Brussels Humanities, Science and Engineering Campus (in Elsene), Brussels Health Campus (in Jette), Brussels Technology Campus (in Anderlecht) and Brussels Photonics Campus (in Gooik).

The Vrije Universiteit Brussel emerged from the 1969 split of the Free University of Brussels, (Note: The split occurred along linguistic lines in 1969, formally establishing the French-speaking Université libre de Bruxelles (ULB) and Dutch-speaking VUB in 1970.) which was founded in 1834 by the lawyer and liberal politician Pierre-Théodore Verhaegen. The founder aimed to establish a university independent from state and church, where academic freedom would prevail. This is still reflected in the university's motto Scientia vincere tenebras, or "Conquering darkness through science", and in its more recent slogan Redelijk eigenzinnig, or "Reasonably self-willed". Accordingly, the university is pluralistic; it is open to all students on the basis of equality regardless of their ideological, political, cultural or social background. It is also managed using democratic structures, which means that all members—from students to faculty—participate in the decision-making processes. (Note: According to the statutes of the VUB.)

The university is organised into eight faculties that accomplish its three central missions: education, research, and public service. The faculties cover a broad range of fields of knowledge including the natural sciences, classics, life sciences, social sciences, humanities, and engineering. The university provides bachelor, master, and doctoral education to about 8,000 undergraduate and 1,000 graduate students.

== Name ==
Brussels has two universities whose names mean Free University of Brussels in English: the French-speaking Université libre de Bruxelles (ULB) and the Dutch-speaking Vrije Universiteit Brussel (VUB). Neither uses the English translation, since it is ambiguous.

== History ==
=== Establishment of a university in Brussels ===
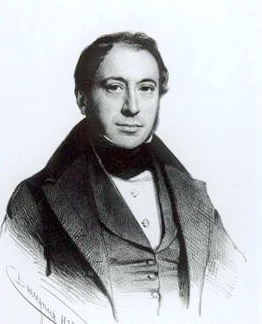
Pierre-Théodore Verhaegen, founder of the Free University of Brussels

The history of the Vrije Universiteit Brussel is closely linked with that of Belgium itself. When the Belgian state was formed in 1830 by nine breakaway provinces from the Kingdom of the Netherlands, three state universities existed in the cities of Ghent, Leuven and Liège, but none in the new capital, Brussels. Since the government was reluctant to fund another state university, a group of leading intellectuals in the fields of arts, science, and education—amongst whom the study prefect of the Royal Athenaeum of Brussels, Auguste Baron, as well as the astronomer and mathematician Adolphe Quetelet—planned to create a private university, which was permitted under the Belgian Constitution.

In 1834, the Belgian episcopate decided to establish a Catholic university in Mechelen with the aim of regaining the influence of the Catholic Church on the academic scene in Belgium, and the government had the intent to close the university at Leuven and donate the buildings to the Catholic institution. The country's liberals strongly opposed to this decision, and furthered their ideas for a university in Brussels as a counterbalance to the Catholic institution. At the same time, Auguste Baron had just become a member of the freemasonic lodge Les Amis Philantropes. Baron was able to convince Pierre-Théodore Verhaegen, the president of the lodge, to support the idea for a new university. On 24 June 1834, Verhaegen presented his plan to establish a free university.

After sufficient funding was collected among advocates, the Université libre de Belgique ("Free University of Belgium") was inaugurated on 20 November 1834, in the Gothic Room of Brussels Town Hall. The date of its establishment is still commemorated annually, by students of its successor institutions, as a holiday called Saint Verhaegen (often shortened to St V) for Pierre-Théodore Verhaegen. In 1836, the university was renamed the Université libre de Bruxelles ("Free University of Brussels").

After its establishment, the Free University faced difficult times, since it received no subsidies or grants from the government; yearly fundraising events and tuition fees provided the only financial means. Verhaegen, who became a professor and later head of the new university, gave it a mission statement which he summarised in a speech to King Leopold I: "the principle of free inquiry and academic freedom uninfluenced by any political or religious authority." In 1858, the Catholic Church established the Saint-Louis Institute in the city, which subsequently expanded into a university in its own right.

=== Growth and internal tensions ===
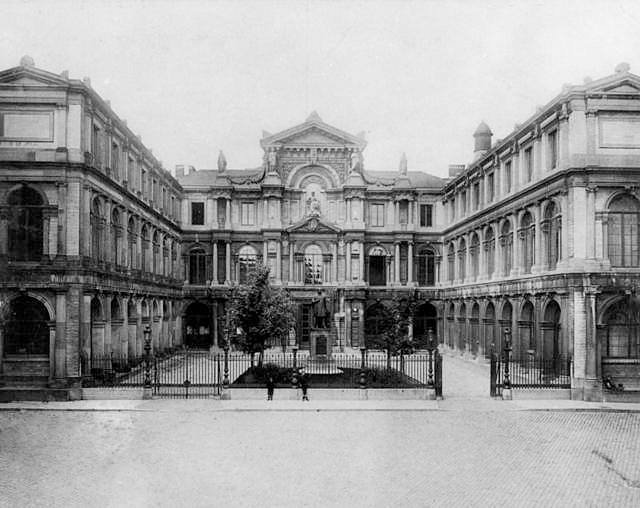
The Free University, then housed in the Granvelle Palace, c. 1900

The Free University grew significantly over the following decades. In 1842, it moved to the Granvelle Palace, which it occupied until 1928. It expanded the number of subjects taught and, in 1880, became one of the first institutions in Belgium to allow female students to study in some faculties. In 1893, it received large grants from Ernest and Alfred Solvay as well as Raoul Warocqué to open new faculties in Brussels. A disagreement over an invitation to the anarchist geographer Élisée Reclus to speak at the university in 1893 from the rector Hector Denis led to some of the liberal and socialist faculty splitting away from the Free University to form the New University of Brussels (Université nouvelle de Bruxelles) in 1894. However, the institution failed to displace the Free University and closed definitively in 1919.

In 1900, the Free University's football team won the bronze medal at the Summer Olympics. After Racing Club de Bruxelles declined to participate, a student selection with players from the university was sent by the Federation. The team was enforced with a few non-students. The Institute of Sociology was founded in 1902, then in 1904 the Solvay School of Commerce, which would later become the Solvay Brussels School of Economics and Management (part of ULB) and VUB Solvay Business School (part of VUB). In 1911, the university obtained its legal personality under the name Université libre de Bruxelles - Vrije Hogeschool te Brussel.

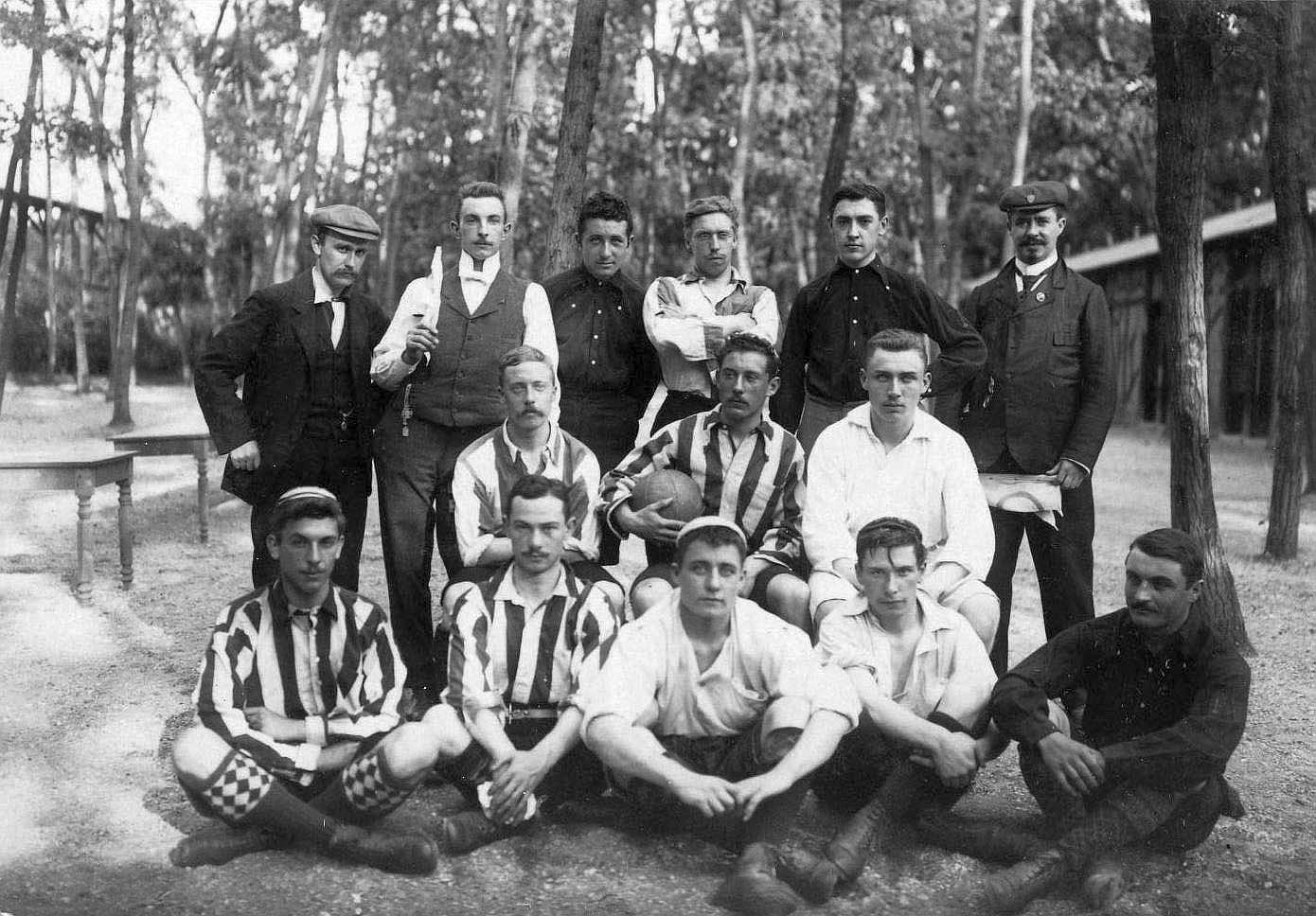
The university's football team that won the bronze medal at the 1900 Olympic Games

=== German occupation and move ===
The German occupation during World War I led to the suspension of classes for four years in 1914–1918. In the aftermath of the war, the Free University moved its principal activities to the Solbosch/Solbos in the southern municipality of Elsene, and a purpose-built university campus was created, funded by the Belgian American Educational Foundation.

During the second occupation of World War II, the university protested the two anti-Jewish ordinances of 28 October 1940, but nevertheless collaborated for the expulsion of Jewish professors and students. However, the university ceased its collaboration when it came to accepting Flemish professors of the New Order. Thus, the university was again closed by the German authorities on 25 November 1941, and some of its students were involved in the Belgian Resistance, establishing the sabotage-orientated network Groupe G.

=== Splitting of the university ===
Courses at the Free University were taught exclusively in French until the early 20th century. After Belgian independence, French was widely accepted as the language of the bourgeoisie and upper classes and was the only medium in law and academia. As the Flemish Movement gained prominence among the Dutch-speaking majority in Flanders over the late 19th century, the lack of provision for Dutch speakers in higher education became a major source of political contention. Ghent University became the first institution in 1930 to teach exclusively in Dutch.

Some courses at the Free University's Faculty of Law began being taught in both French and Dutch as early as 1935. Nevertheless, it was not until 1963 that all faculties offered their courses in both languages. Tensions between French- and Dutch-speaking students in the country came to a head in 1968 when the Catholic University of Leuven split along linguistic lines, becoming the first of several national institutions to do so.

On 1 October 1969, the French and Dutch entities of the Free University separated into two distinct sister universities. This splitting became official with the act of 28 May 1970, of the Belgian Parliament, by which the Dutch-speaking Vrije Universiteit Brussel (VUB) and the French-speaking Université libre de Bruxelles (ULB) officially became two separate legal, administrative and scientific entities.

== Organisation ==
The Vrije Universiteit Brussel is an independent institution. The members of all its governing entities are elected by the entire academic community – including faculty staff, researchers, personnel, and students. This system guarantees the democratic process of decision-making and the independence from state and outside organisations. Nevertheless, the university receives significant funding from the Flemish government, although less than other Flemish universities. Other important funding sources are grants for research projects (mostly from Belgian and European funding agencies), scholarships of academic members, revenues from cooperation with industry, and tuition fees to a lesser extent.

The main organisational structure of the VUB is its division into faculties:

- Faculty of Law and Criminology
- Faculty of Social Sciences & Solvay Business School
- Faculty of Psychology and Educational Sciences
- Faculty of Sciences and Bio-engineering Sciences
- Faculty of Medicine and Pharmacy
- Faculty of Arts and Philosophy
- Faculty of Engineering
- Faculty of Physical Education and Physiotherapy

These faculties benefit a wide autonomy over how they structure their educational programmes and research efforts, although their decisions need to comply with the university's statutes and must be approved by the central administration.

The central administration is formed by the Governing Board, which is currently presided by Eddy Van Gelder. It decides the university's long-term vision and must approve all decisions made by the faculties. The Governing Board is supported by three advising bodies: the Research Council, the Education Council, and the Senate. These bodies provide advice to the Governing Board on all issues regarding research, education, and the academic excellence of faculty staff, and may also propose changes to the university's strategy. The daily management of the university is the responsibility of the Rector and three Vice-Rectors.

As of 2022, the rector of the VUB is Jan Danckaert, who succeeded Caroline Pauwels, who resigned in 2022 for health reasons.

== Education ==
The Vrije Universiteit Brussel offers courses in a large variety of modern disciplines: law, economics, social sciences, management, psychology, physical sciences, life sciences, medical sciences, pharmaceutical sciences, humanities, engineering, physical education. About 22,000 students follow one of its 128 educational programmes. All programmes are taught in Dutch, but 59 are also taught in English. In agreement with the Bologna process, the university has implemented the so-called bachelor-master system. It therefore issues four types of degrees: bachelor's, master's, master after master's, and doctoral degrees.

Admission to the programmes is generally not restricted; anyone can subscribe to the programme of his/her choice. However, prerequisite degrees may be mandatory for advanced programmes, e.g., a bachelor's degree is required to subscribe to a master's programme, and a master's degree is required to subscribe to a master after master's or doctoral programme. An exception to this is the admission exam to the bachelor in medicine, which is required following ruling of the Flemish government. Tuition fees are low, and even decreased or eliminated for some students with less financial means.

The academic year is divided into two semesters, each spanning thirteen course weeks: the first semester lasts from October to January, the second semester from February to June. Students take exams in January and June. Apart from the Christmas and Easter holidays (both lasting two weeks) that are normally used to prepare for the exams, students are free the week between both semesters and during the summer vacations from July to September.

The university has implemented several quality control schemes in order to preserve the high quality of its educational programmes. Each semester, all students evaluate the courses they have followed. All programmes are also regularly assessed by internal panels and by external international visitation committees. Furthermore, all programmes are accredited by the Nederlands-Vlaamse Accreditatie Organisatie, an independent accreditation organisation charged with the accreditation of higher education programmes in both Flanders and the Netherlands.

== Rankings ==
The university is included in major world university rankings such as Times Higher Education World University Rankings, QS World University Rankings and Academic Ranking of World Universities.

The VUB's research articles are on average more cited than articles by any other Flemish university.

University rankings

Global – Overall
- ARWU World: 301–400 (2023)
- CWUR World: 359 (2020-21)
- CWTS World: 412 (2020)
- QS World: =294 (2026)
- THE World: 201–250 (2024)
- USNWR Global: =292 (2023)

== Basic principles ==
The Vrije Universiteit Brussel considers itself an open-minded and tolerant university. Its central principles are the Universal Declaration of Human Rights and in particular the principle of free inquiry for the progress of humanity. The latter includes the dismissal of any argument of authority and the right of free opinion. The VUB is the only Flemish university that has incorporated such principle in its statutes. The principle of free inquiry is often described by a quotation of the French mathematician and philosopher Henri Poincaré:

Thinking must never submit itself,
neither to a dogma,
nor to a party,
nor to a passion,
nor to an interest,
nor to a preconceived idea,
nor to anything whatsoever,
except to the facts themselves,
because for it to submit to anything else would be the end of its existence.

This principle is also reflected in the university's motto Scientia vincere tenebras, or Conquering darkness through science, and in its seal. The seal of the VUB displays a beggar's wallet and joined hands on the orange-white-blue (the colours of the Prince of Orange) escutcheon in the emblem, referring to the struggle of the Protestant Geuzen and the Prince of Orange against the oppressive Spanish rule and the Inquisition in the sixteenth century.

Another basic principle of the VUB, incorporated in the university's statutes, is that the institution must be managed according to the model of democracy. Practically, this means that all members of the academic community—faculty staff, researchers, personnel, and students—are represented in all governing bodies. In this way, the university ensures that everyone has a voice in its decision-making processes and participates in its management. This principle must also guarantee the independence of the university and the academic freedom.

== Campuses ==
=== Brussels Humanities, Sciences & Engineering Campus ===
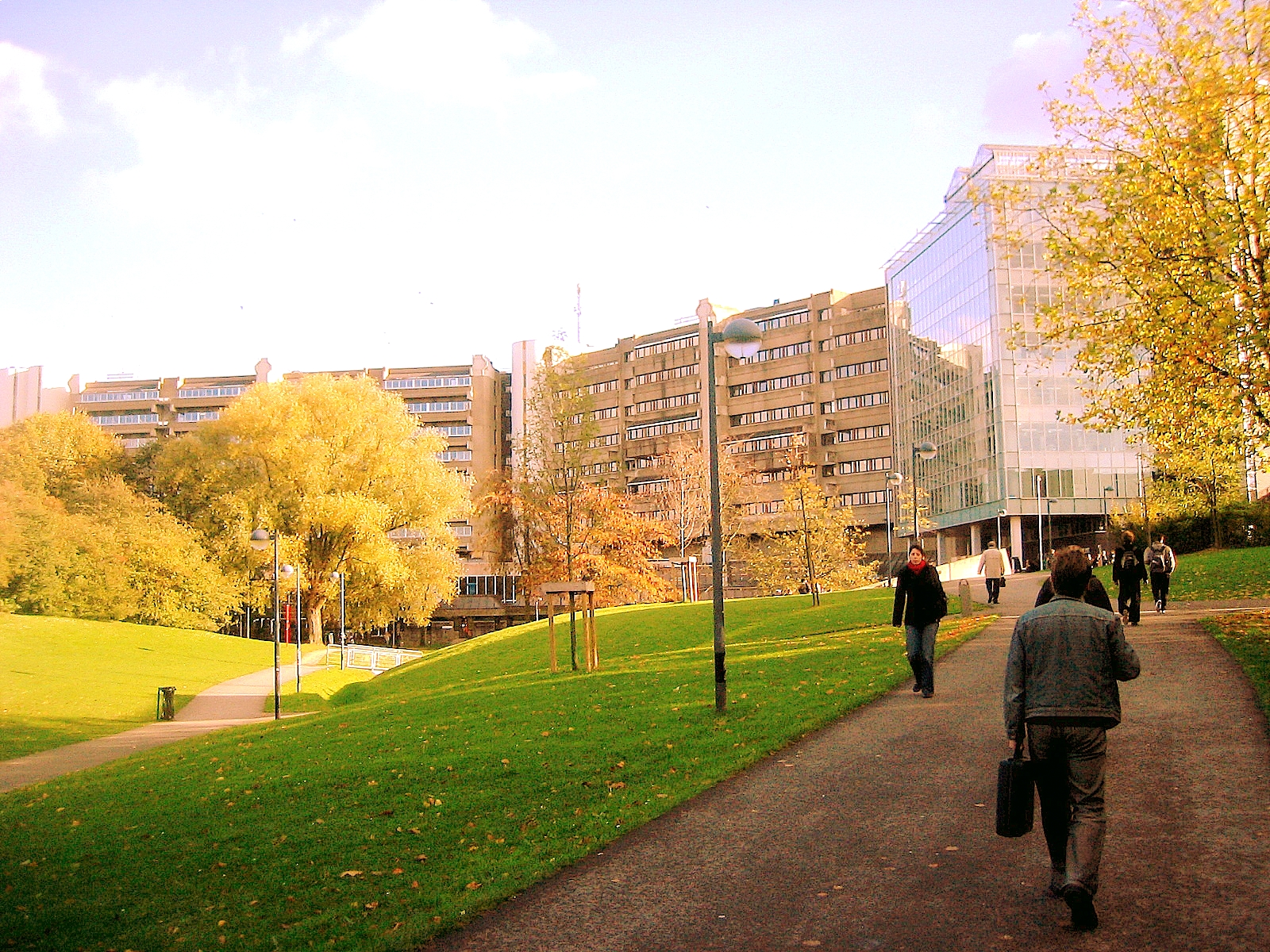
Etterbeek campus at La Plaine/Het Plein

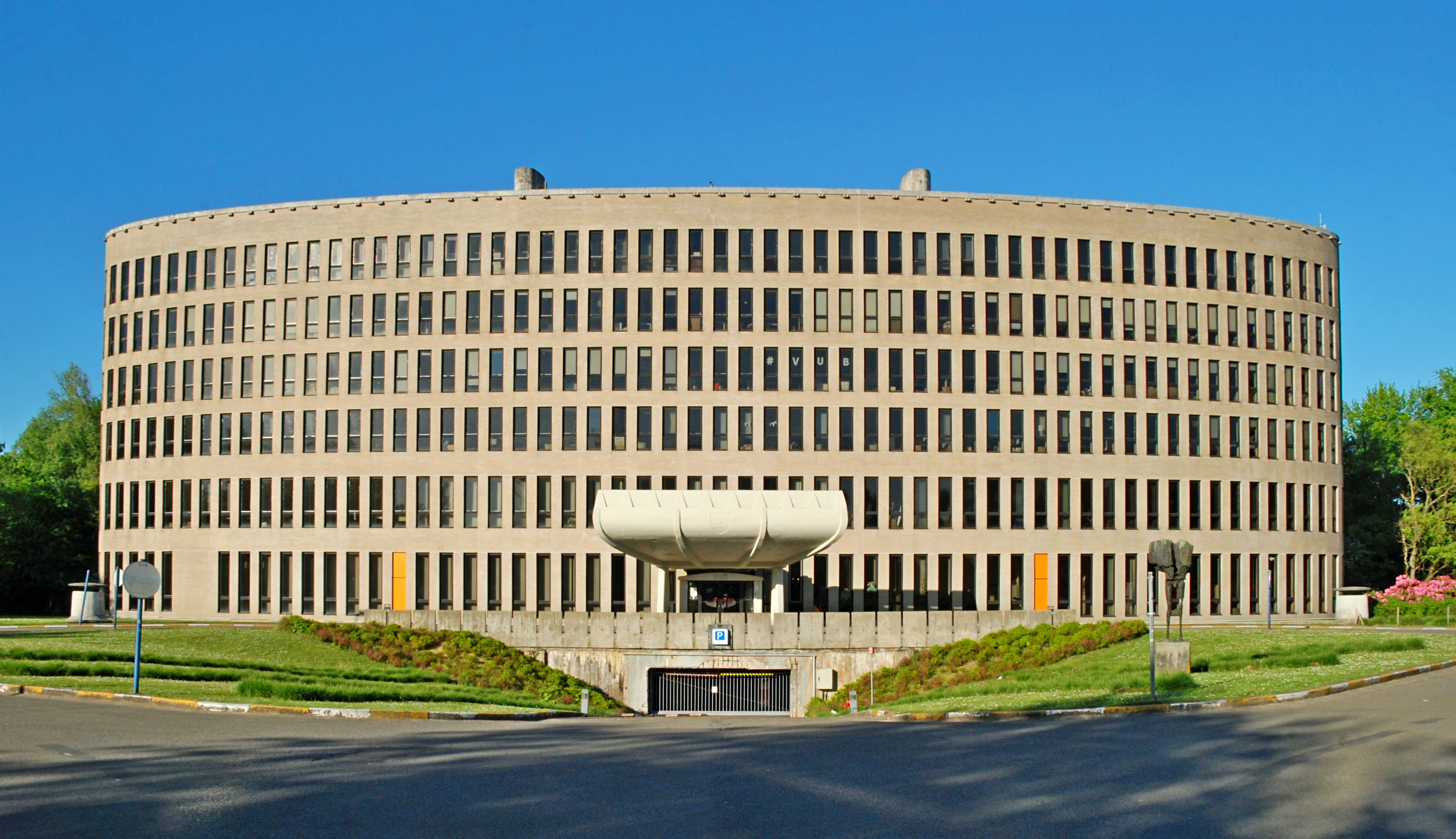
Braem Building (Rectoraat, VUB)

Most of the faculties are located on the Etterbeek campus (which is actually located at La Plaine/Het Plein on the territory of the neighbouring municipality of Elsene). It is the livelier of the two campuses and consists almost entirely of concrete structures, most built in the 1970s. Some are decaying rapidly but at least one, the Rectoraat designed by Renaat Braem, is heritage-listed. Activities take place in numerous auditoriums and labs. In addition, there is a modern sports centre, a football pitch encircled by a running track, and a swimming pool. For eating out, there is a restaurant with subsidies for students and staff, and the bars/cafes 't Complex, Opinio, Pilar and KultuurKaffee. KultuurKaffee was a full-fledged concert venue during the evening/night, offering the university a cultural scene and organising free concerts and events. It was demolished to make space for the new XY construction project in 2015.

=== Brussels Health Campus ===
The campus in Jette is also a fully-fledged campus. The University Hospital (UZ Brussel) is in the vicinity. All courses and research in the life sciences (medicine, pharmacy, dentistry, the biomedical and paramedical sciences) are located here.

=== Brussels Technology Campus ===
The campus Kaai in Anderlecht was established in 2013 and shared with the Erasmushogeschool Brussel. It houses the Industrial Engineering section of the Faculty of Engineering. Among extensive industrial laboratory facilities, the Brussels fablab has grown to the centre of activity on the campus in recent years.

=== Brussels Photonics Campus ===
This campus is located in Gooik.

== Faculties ==
- Languages and Humanities
- Social Sciences and Solvay Business School
- Engineering
- Medicine and Pharmacy
- Psychology and Educational Sciences
- Sciences and Biomedical Sciences
- Law and Criminology
- Physical Education and Physiotherapy

== Institutional cooperation ==
The Vrije Universiteit Brussel cooperates with several institutions of higher education. They are:

- Brussels Chamber of Commerce
- Erasmushogeschool Brussel (together with the VUB they make up the Brussels University Association)
- UCLouvain Higher Institute for Re-adaptation Sciences
- Top Industrial Managers for Europe
- UCOS, the University Development Cooperation Centre
- UNICA, the Institutional Network of the UNIversities from the CApitals of Europe
- Université libre de Bruxelles
- University of Kent (Brussels School of International Studies)
- Vesalius College, an anglophone institution sharing the VUB campus
- The Brussels School of Governance
- XIOS Hogeschool Limburg and Provinciale Hogeschool Limburg
- Royal Military Academy

On the international level, the VUB has concluded institutional collaboration agreements with 38 universities all over the world, and student exchange agreements with 160 universities.

== Student life ==
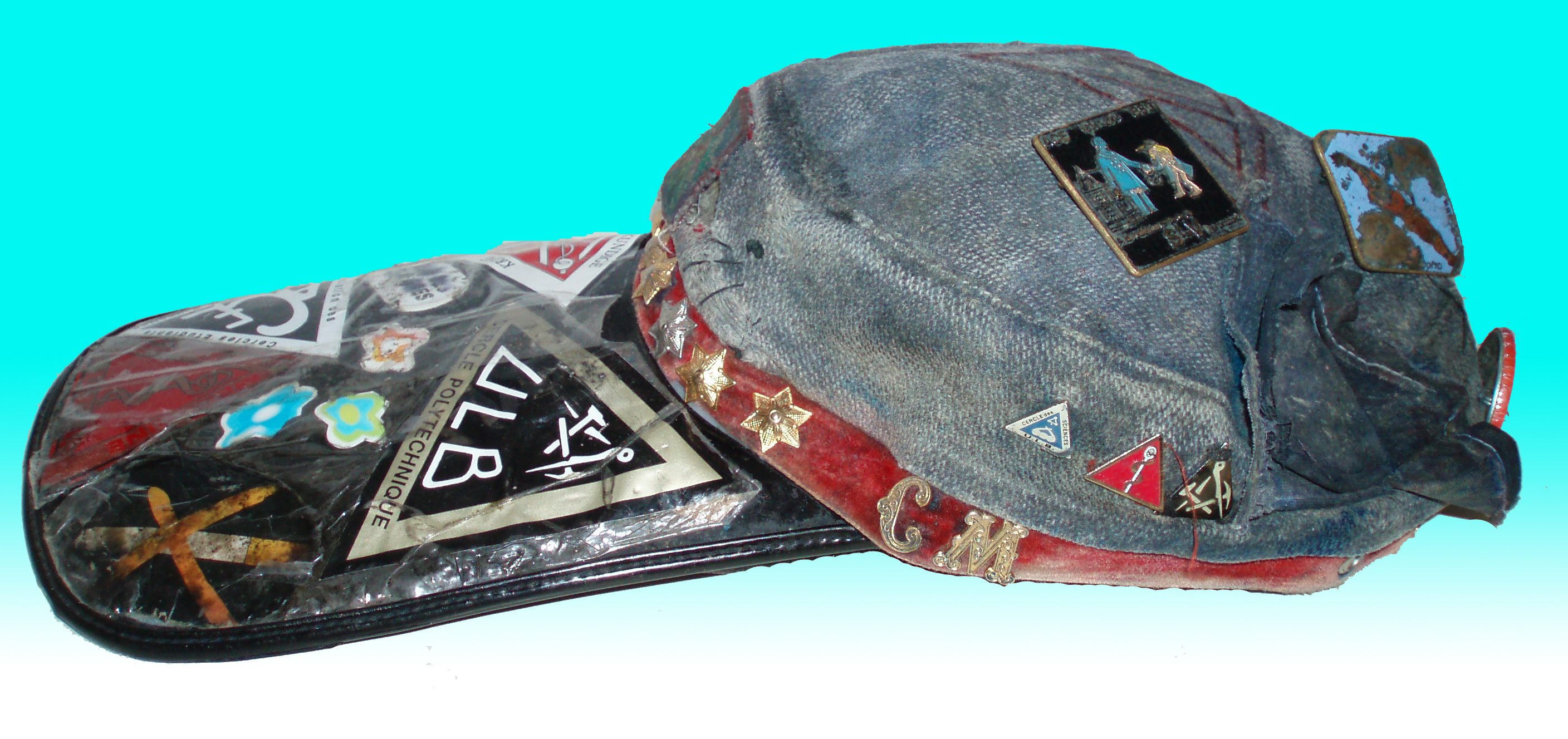
A traditional klak or penne

The BSG is the umbrella organisation for all other student organisations and acts as the defender of the moral interests of the students. Together with their French-speaking counterparts ACE at the ULB, they organise the annual St V memorial.

These are some of the student organisations at the VUB:

- Studiekring vrij onderzoek: a collective of students from various faculties, promoting free inquiry through the organisation of debates, lectures and more
- Letteren-en Wijsbegeertekring (LWK): for students studying at the Arts and Philosophy faculty
- Geneeskundige Kring (GK) and Farmaceutische Kring (FK): for students studying at the Medicine and Pharmacy faculty
- Polytechnische Kring (PK) for students studying at the Engineering faculty
- Psycho-Ped'Agogische Kring (PPK): for students studying at the Psychology and Educational Sciences faculty
- Kring der Politieke Economische en Sociale Wetenschappen (KEPS) and Solvay ($); for students studying at the Economics and Political faculty
- Wetenschappelijke Kring (WK): for students studying at the faculty of Sciences and Bio-engineering Sciences
- Mens Sana in Corpore Sano (Mesacosa or MC): for students studying at the Physical Education and Physiotherapy faculty
- Vlaams Rechtsgenootschap (VRG): for students studying at the Law and Criminology faculty
- Vrije Universiteit Brussel Model United Nations (VUBMUN): for all students of the VUB.
- We Decolonize VUB: for ethnic minority students at the VUB.

Members of these organisations (except VUBMUN) wear a klak (Dutch) or penne (French).

Furthermore, the VUB has student organisations for students with a specific regional background. They are: Antverpia (Antwerp), Westland (Westhoek), WUK (West Flanders), KBS (Brussels and Flemish Brabant), Campina (Campine), Kinneke Baba (East Flanders), Limburgia (Limburg), VSKM (Mechelen), Hesbania (Haspengouw) and Ibérica (Latin America and Iberian peninsula). There are also several organisations for specific majors within a faculty, such as Infogroep (computer science), Biotecho (bio-engineering), bru:tecture (previously Pantheon) (architecture) and Promeco, Inisol and Business Club (economics). Last but not least there are organisations centred around a common interest, such as the Society of Weird And Mad People (SWAMP, for all kinds of games), BierKultuur (based on the rich beer culture in Belgium) and Liberaal Vlaams Studentenverbond (LVSV, students interested in classic liberalism).

== Notable people ==
=== Notable faculty ===
- Diederik Aerts
- Kris Deschouwer
- Paul Devroey
- Mark Elchardus
- Francis Heylighen
- Jonathan Holslag
- Dave Sinardet
- Hugo Soly
- Luc Steels
- Jean-Paul Van Bendegem
- Willy van Ryckeghem
- Andre Van Steirteghem
- Irina Veretennicoff
- Els Witte
- Lode Wyns

=== Notable alumni ===
==== Scientists and academics ====
- Leo Apostel (1925–1995)
- Patrick Baert (born 1961)
- Sathyabhama Das Biju (born 1963), Indian amphibian biologist and wildlife conservationist.
- Jean Bourgain (1954–2018)
- Antoon Van den Braembussche (born 1946)
- Guy Brasseur (born 1948), climate scientist
- Bob Coecke (born 1968), Belgian theoretical physicist and logician and professor of Quantum Foundations, Logics and Structures at the University of Oxford
- Ingrid Daubechies (born 1954), Belgian physicist and mathematician and Professor at Duke University
- Kris Deschouwer
- Guido Geerts (born 1935), Flemish linguist and professor emeritus at KU Leuven
- Willy Gepts (1922–1991)
- Raymond Hamers, discoverer of 'single-chain antibodies' or nanobodies
- Francis Heylighen
- Clement Hiel (born 1952), Belgian engineer and professor
- Steven Laureys
- Wim Leemans
- Pattie Maes (born 1961), Professor of Media Technology at Media Lab MIT
- Kieran Moore, Chief Medical Officer of Health of Ontario Canada
- Frank Pattyn (born 1966), Belgian glaciologist and professor at the Université libre de Bruxelles.
- Ram Lakhan Ray (born 1968)
- Peter Rousseeuw (born 1956), Belgian statistician and professor at KU Leuven
- Sophie de Schaepdrijver (born 1961)
- Johan Schoukens
- Helena Van Swygenhoven
- Els Witte
- Christine Van Den Wyngaert (born 1952), former Judge of the International Criminal Court

==== Artists ====
- Claude Coppens (born 1936), Belgian pianist and composer
- André Delvaux (1926–2002), Belgian film director
- Fabienne Demal (Axelle Red) (born 1968), Belgian singer and songwriter
- Jef Geeraerts (born 1930), Belgian writer
- Stéphane Ginsburgh (born 1969), Belgian pianist
- Sapiyossi, singer, composer, dancer, fashion designer, and choreographer
- Erik Pevernagie (born 1939), Belgian painter and writer
- Marcel Vanthilt (born 1957), Belgian singer and television presenter

==== Businesspeople ====
- Pieter De Leenheer
- Tony Mary (born 1950)
- Felix Van de Maele

==== Politicians ====
- Amir-Abbas Hoveyda (1919–1979), former Prime Minister of Iran
- Marco Formentini (1930–2021), Italian politician, former mayor of Milan.
- Willy Claes (born 1938), former Minister of Foreign Affair and former Secretary General of NATO.
- Louis Tobback (born 1938), former mayor of Leuven and former Minister of the Interior of Belgium.
- Annemie Neyts-Uyttebroeck (born 1944)
- Norbert De Batselier (born 1947)
- Marc Verwilghen (born 1952), former Minister of Justice of Belgium.
- Karel De Gucht (born 1954), former Minister of Foreign Affairs for Belgium.
- Christian Leysen (born 1954)
- Patrick Dewael (born 1955), former Minister of the interior of Belgium.
- Frank Vanhecke (born 1959)
- Bert Anciaux (born 1959)
- Gunther Sleeuwagen (born 1958)
- Jan Jambon (born 1960)
- Maggie De Block (born 1962), former Minister of Health for Belgium.
- Hans Bonte (born 1962)
- Florika Fink-Hooijer (born 1962)
- Zoran Milanović (born 1966), President of Croatia
- Bruno Tobback (born 1969)
- Wouter Beke (born 1974)
- Alexander De Croo (born 1975), Prime Minister of Belgium
- Tinne Van der Straeten (born 1978), Minister of Energy, Belgium
- Zuhal Demir (born 1980)
- Nadia Sminate (born 1981)
- Sammy Mahdi (born 1988)

==== Athletes ====
- Sébastien Godefroid (born 1971), Olympic sailor
- Emma Meesseman, Belgian professional basketball player
- Dirk Van Tichelt, Olympic judoka
- Jürgen Roelandts, Belgian professional road bicycle racer
- Kathleen Smet, Olympic triathlon

==== Journalists ====
- Yves Desmet
- Jean Mentens
- Danira Boukhriss, Flemish television presenter and newscaster.
- Tim Trachet, Belgian writer, publicist and journalist

=== Honorary doctorates ===
Notable recipients of honorary doctorates (doctor honoris causa) at the Vrije Universiteit Brussel include:

- Nelson Mandela
- Daniel Barenboim
- Hans Blix
- Noam Chomsky
- Kim Clijsters
- Jacques Cousteau
- Richard Dawkins
- Dario Fo
- Sonia Gandhi
- Julia Gillard
- Rom Harré
- Václav Havel
- Johann Olav Koss
- Natan Ramet
- Richard Stallman
- Herman van Veen

== See also ==
- Flanders Interuniversity Institute of Biotechnology (VIB)
- Interuniversity Microelectronics Centre (IMEC)
- Science and technology in Brussels
- Science and technology in Flanders
- Top Industrial Managers for Europe
- University Foundation
- List of split up universities
