= Guy Brasseur =

Belgian meteorologist and climate scientist

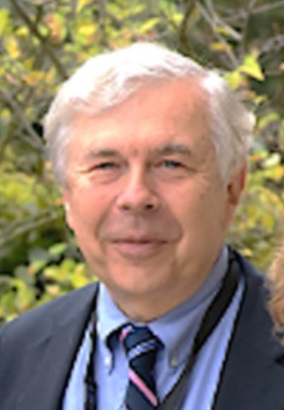
- Alma mater: Université Libre de Bruxelles
- Occupation: Politician; atmospheric chemist; university teacher; scientist; physicist; meteorologist
- Employer: Max Planck Institute for Meteorology; National Center for Atmospheric Research; Royal Belgian Institute for Space Aeronomy
- Awards: Fellow of the International Science Council (2023–); doctor honoris causa from the Pierre and Marie Curie University (2005)
- Position held: member of the Chamber of Representatives of Belgium (1977–1982), substitute member of the Parliamentary Assembly of the Council of Europe (1977–1982)

Guy P. Brasseur (born 19 June 1948) is a Belgian meteorologist and climate scientist. His research interests include stratospheric ozone depletion, global air pollution, solar-terrestrial interactions and earth system research.

== Career ==
Brasseur studied at the Vrije Universiteit Brussel and earned two engineering degrees, one in physics (1971) and another in telecommunications and electronics (1974). He then earned a PhD in physics at the same university. He worked at the Belgian Space Institute. In 1988 he joined the National Center for Atmospheric Research (NCAR) in Boulder, Colorado. In 2000 he became Director at the Max Planck Institute for Meteorology (MPI-M) and Scientific Director of the German Climate Computing Centre (DKRZ). From 2006 to 2009 he worked at NCAR. He founded the Climate Service Center Germany (HZG). Today he is head of the environmental modeling research group at the MPI-M and honorary professor at the University of Hamburg. He became a member of the Academia Europaea in 2000.
