= Marcel Nicolet =

Belgian physicist and meteorologist

Marcel Nicolet (1912–1996) was a Belgian physicist and meteorologist.

Nicolet was born in Basse-Bodeux, Belgium on February 26, 1912. He received a degree in physics in 1934 after writing a dissertation on the spectrum of O and B stars and his Ph.D. in astrophysics from University of Liège in 1937.

After a few years as forecasting meteorologist he turned to the theory of ionized layers in the terrestrial atmosphere (fundamental book 1945). After World War II he met the most known colleagues at the meeting of the International Union of Radio Science (URSI) at Paris 1946. He came to the United States first in 1950 where amongst other colleagues he met David Bates a scholar of Sir Harrie Massey the well-known physico-chemist. At that time Sir Harrie directed his interest towards the atmosphere. With Bates, Nicolet published four fundamental papers. In the following decades Nicolet was often invited to the US but the Institut royal meteorologique de Belgique remained his lifelong scientific home.

He became one of the main promoters and finally secretary general of the International Geophysical Year, that due to the participation of all important nations (except China) became a most important scientific exercise worldwide. Nicolet was elected as its secretary general. King Baudouin of Belgium granted him the title of Baron in 1987 for his important contribution to the success of the International Geophysical Year.

He received several highly esteemed prizes e.g. the William Bowie Medal of the American Geophysical Union in 1984.

== See also ==
- Lloyd Berkner

== Publications ==
- Nicolet, Marcel (1945). Contribution à l'étude de la structure de l'ionosphère. Brussels. Institut royal météorologique de Belgique. Mémoires, 19. Bruxelles: Etabliss. d'imprimerie l'Avenir. OCLC 22532473.
