= David Sandwell =

David T. Sandwell is an American geophysicist. He is a fellow of the American Association for the Advancement of Science, the American Geophysical Union and the Geological Society of America. He is the recipient of the 2018 Charles A. Whitten Medal for his "outstanding achievement in research on the form and dynamics of the Earth and planets".
