= Gordon Pettengill =

American radio astronomer and planetary physicist (1926–2021)

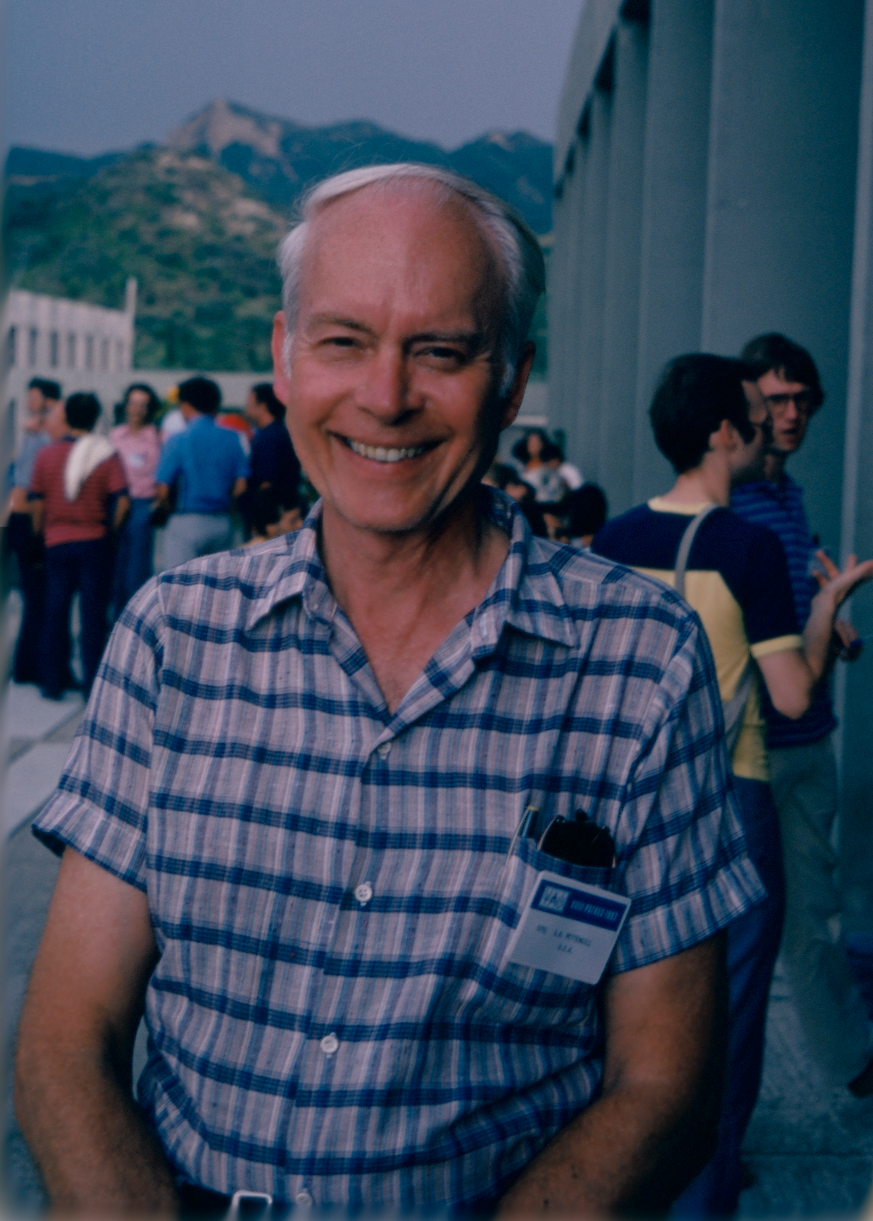
- Pettengill at the IAU General Assembly in Patras, Greece, August 1982
- Born: Gordon H. Pettengill; February 10, 1926; Providence, Rhode Island, U.S.
- Died: May 8, 2021 (aged 95); Concord, Massachusetts, U.S.
- Education: Massachusetts Institute of Technology; University of California, Berkeley
- Awards: Guggenheim Fellowship (1980); Magellanic Premium (1994); Whipple Award (1995); Charles A. Whitten Medal (1997)
- Scientific career
- Thesis: Measurements on Proton-Proton Scattering in the Energy Region 150 to 340 MEV (1954)
- Doctoral students: Steven J. Ostro; Stewart Nozette

Gordon Hemenway Pettengill (February 10, 1926 – May 8, 2021) was an American radio astronomer and planetary physicist. He was one of the first to take radar from its original military application to its use as a tool for astronomy. He was professor emeritus at the Massachusetts Institute of Technology.

== Early life and education ==
Gordon Pettengill was born in Providence, Rhode Island, and grew up in Dedham, Massachusetts where he developed a fascination with radio and electronics. He often took apart and rebuilt old radios. Pettengill was interested in amateur radio and his callsign was W1OUN.

Pettengill began studying physics at the Massachusetts Institute of Technology (MIT) in 1942 at the age of 16. His studies were briefly interrupted by service in Europe at the end of World War II. When he turned 18, he was drafted into the United States Army where he served in the infantry and then with a Signal Corps company stationed in Austria. After World War II ended, he returned to MIT where he received a Bachelor of Science in 1948. This was followed by work at Los Alamos and a doctorate in physics from the University of California, Berkeley in 1955.

== Career and research ==
Pettengill began his career at the MIT Lincoln Laboratory in 1954. By the late 1950s, he was part of a group using the then-new Millstone Hill radar for the earliest work in radar astronomy. When it became operational in late 1957, Pettengill used this radar to "skin track" Sputnik I, the first such observation of a satellite. His earliest research extending beyond the Earth's orbit was with this same radar in 1961; he used it to make the first ranging measurements to another planet, Venus. These first observations yielded a value for the astronomical unit in terrestrial units which has an accuracy 3 orders of magnitude greater than had been possible with the armamentarium of classical positional astronomy. Such knowledge was critical for the navigation of Mariner 2 to Venus.

Pettengill successfully completed a two-dimensional radar mapping of the Moon in 1960, a key step in the U.S. preparations for the Apollo program, ensuring that the Apollo astronauts would not disappear under a meters-thick layer of dust.

From 1963 to 1965, Pettengill served as associate director and from 1968 to 1970 as Director of the Arecibo Observatory in Puerto Rico. At Arecibo, Pettengill and Rolf Dyce used radar pulses to measure the spin rate of Mercury and found that Mercury's day was 59 Earth days, not 88 as had been previously thought.

He was appointed Professor of Planetary Physics in the Department of Earth and Planetary Sciences at MIT in 1970.

In the late 1960s and early 1970s, Pettengill led ground-based radar studies of the surface properties of all of the inner planets, including the Earth's (via a "triple-bounce" experiment: Moon-Earth-Moon). Pettengill also played a leading role in the first radar studies of an asteroid (Icarus, in 1968), a comet (Encke, in 1980), and moons of other planets (the Galilean satellites, starting in 1976). In all of this work, Pettengill made use of radar systems at MIT's Haystack Observatory and Cornell's Arecibo Observatory, systems whose development he had guided for astronomical applications. Also in the 1970s, he was involved in several unmanned missions to Mars (including the Viking program).

For over two decades, beginning in 1977, he concentrated most heavily on Venus, this time utilizing radars aboard spacecraft, first the Pioneer Venus orbiter and later, Magellan. For many years, he pursued the idea for using a radar altimeter to map Venus and contributed key technical ideas. The results, in part, were detailed reflectivity and topographic maps of virtually the entire planet of Venus, providing geologists and geophysicists with lifetimes of work to understand the development of Venus' crust and the history of its interior. Many planetary scientists feel he was one of the individuals most responsible for our present knowledge of Venus (aside from its atmosphere).

His observations embraced Mercury, Venus, Mars, several asteroids and comets, the Galilean satellites of Jupiter and the rings of Saturn.

== Awards and honours ==
He won the Charles A. Whitten Medal from the American Geophysical Union in 1997. The asteroid 3831 Pettengill is named after him.

== Publications ==
- G.H. Pettengill and D.E. Dustin, "A Comparison of Selected ICBM Early-Warning Radar Configurations," MIT Lincoln Laboratory Technical Report 127, 1956.
