= Rosine Lallement =

Researcher at the Paris Observatory

Rosine Lallement is a French researcher at the Paris Observatory and a foreign member of the U.S. National Academy of Sciences. Lallement studies the heliosphere and interstellar medium. In her research, she has helped demonstrate that the motion of the interstellar cloud outside the heliosphere is identical to that of interstellar helium inside the heliosphere. She is a member of the IAU.
