= Johannes Geiss =

German physicist (1926–2020)

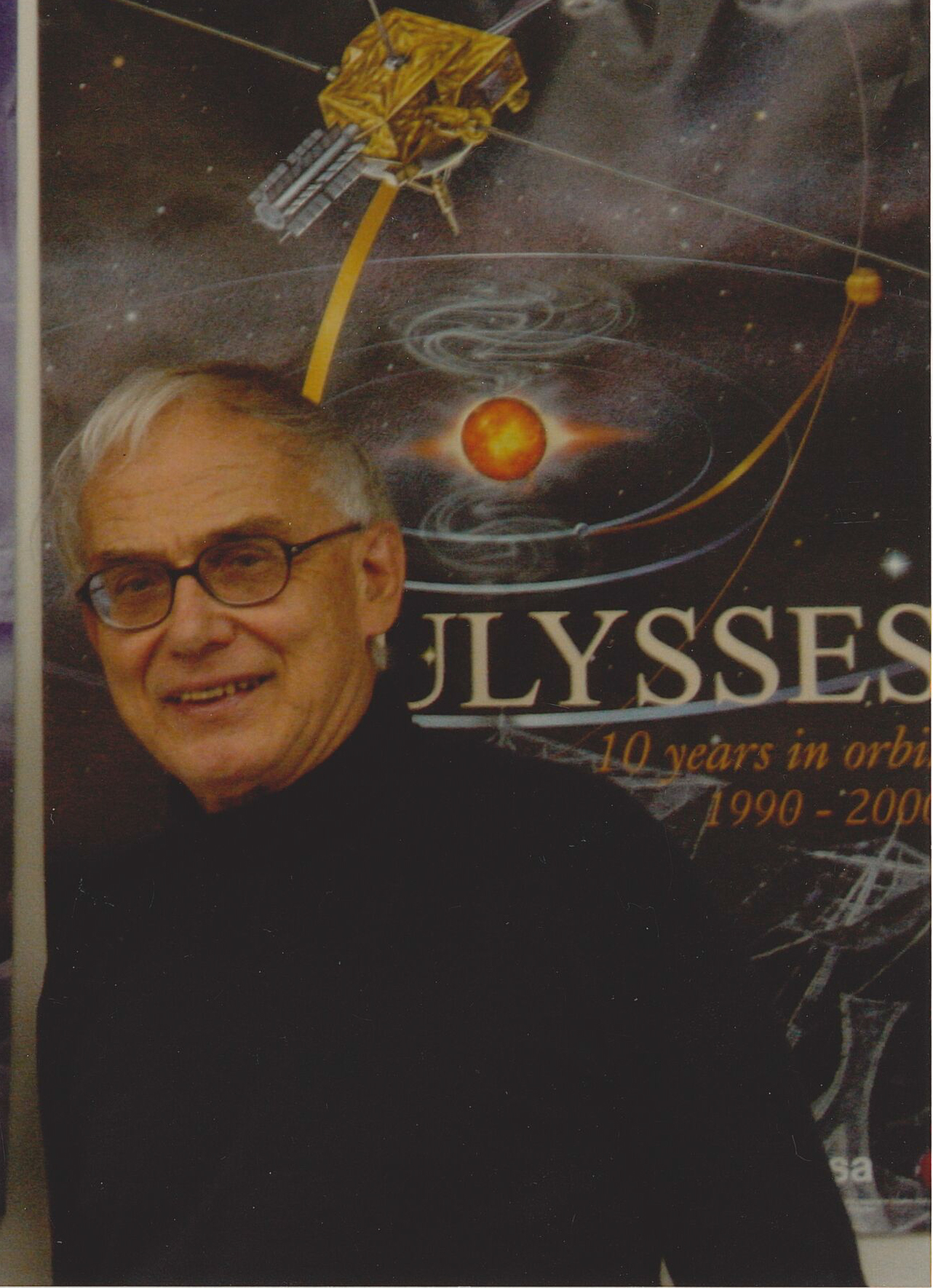
- Geiss in 2002
- Born: 4 September 1926; Słupsk, Poland
- Died: 30 January 2020 (aged 93)
- Occupation: Physicist

Johannes Geiss (4 September 1926 – 30 January 2020) was a German physicist.

== Biography ==
Geiss was born in 1926 in modern-day Poland, the son of farmers Hans Geiss and Irene Wilk. In 1955, he married Carmen Bach.

Geiss studied physics in Göttingen from 1947 to 1950. He published his doctoral thesis in 1953, titled Isotopenanalysen an „gewöhnlichem Blei“. He then conducted research on geochronology at the University of Bern and University of Chicago. From 1958 to 1959, Geiss was an associate professor at the University of Miami before returning to Bern, working there until 1991. At Bern he devised the Solar Wind Composition Experiment for the Apollo program to measure the isotopic and elemental composition of noble gases in the solar wind. From 1995 to 2002, he was co-director of the International Space Science Institute. In 2019, a bronze statue of Geiss was erected on the University of Bern campus by Horst Bohnet.

Johannes Geiss died on 30 January 2020 at the age of 93.

== Awards and honors ==
- Honorary Member of the French Academy of Sciences (1978)
- Honorary Member of the American Academy of Arts and Sciences (1978)
- Allan D. Emil Memorial Award (1989)
- Honorary Member of the Academia Europaea (1989)
- Albert Einstein Medal (2001)
- William Bowie Medal (2005)
