= UMIT Tirol - Private University for Health Sciences and Health Technology =

Private University for Health Sciences, Medical Sciences and Technology
- Private Universität für Gesundheitswissenschaften, Medizinische Informatik und Technik
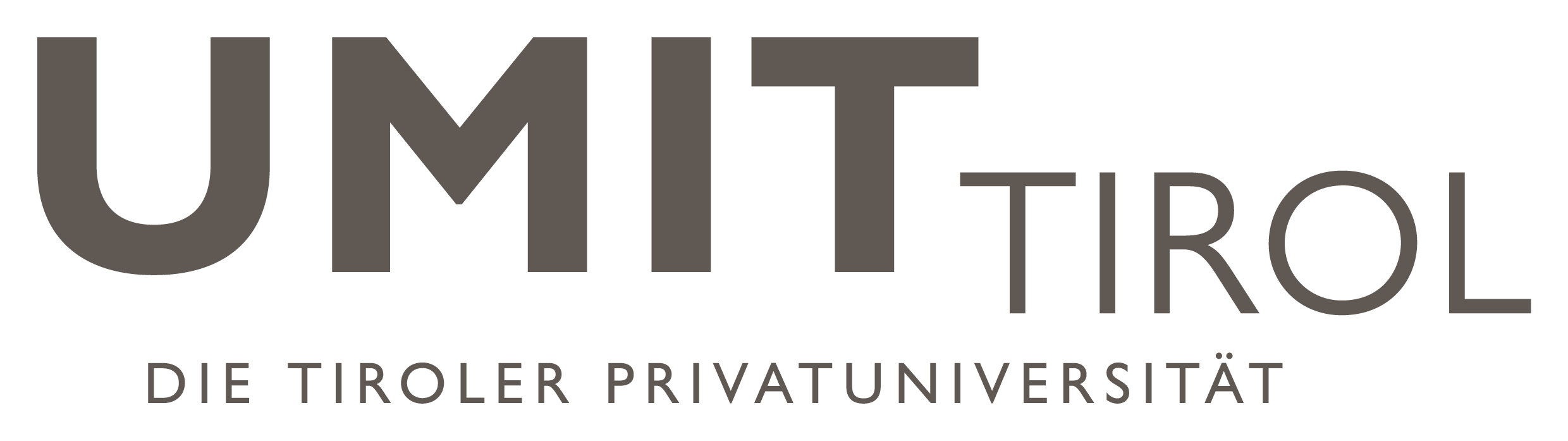
- Type: Private university
- Established: 2004
- Location: Hall in Tirol, Austria
- Website: https://www.umit.at/page.cfm?vpath=studien&switchLocale=en_US

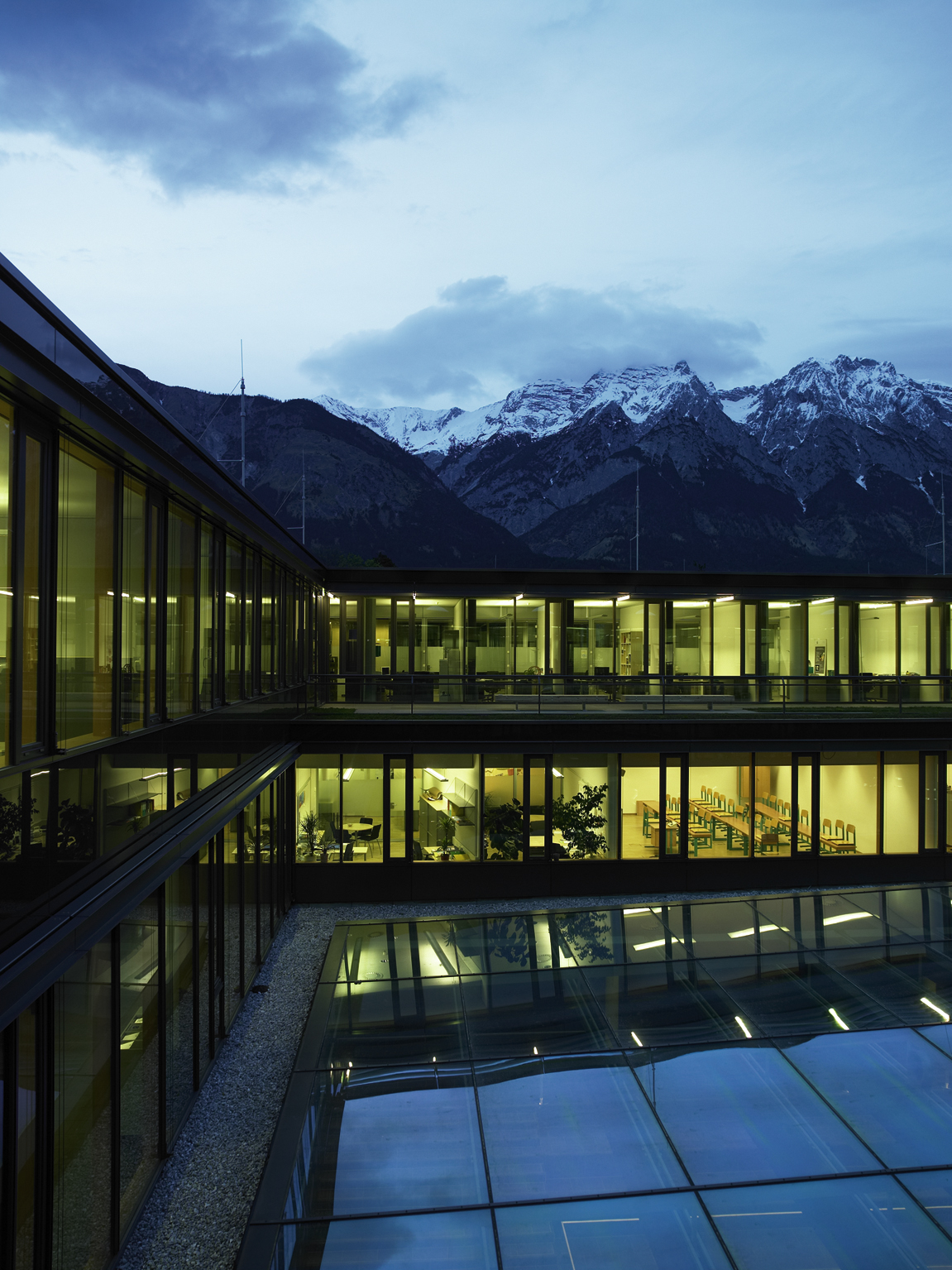
Private University for Health Sciences, Medical Sciences and Technology

The Private University for Health Sciences, Medical Sciences and Technology (abbreviated UMIT) (German: Private Universität für Gesundheitswissenschaften, Medizinische Informatik und Technik) sees itself as a Health University and is located in Hall in Tirol. It was founded in 2001 in Innsbruck under the name of Private University of Medical computer science and technology Tirol. In 2004 the university got its present name in connection with the expansion of the health sciences as a private university.
