= Willem Malkus =

American mathematician (1923–2016)

Willem V. R. Malkus (November 19, 1923 – May 28, 2016) was an American researcher of applied mathematics. A professor at MIT from 1969 to 1996, he was one of the inventors of the Malkus waterwheel.

Malkus was a fellow of the American Academy of Arts and Sciences, the American Physical Society and the American Geophysical Union, and a member of the National Academy of Sciences. He received two Guggenheim Fellowships. He is a son of Alida Malkus.
