= William M. Kaula =

American geophysicist

William Mason Kaula
- Born: May 19, 1926; Sydney, Australia
- Died: April 1, 2000 (aged 73); Los Angeles
- Education: United States Military Academy, Ohio State University
- Known for: Satellite geodesy
- Scientific career
- Fields: Geodesy, Geophysics, Planetary science
- Workplaces: University of California at Los Angeles, Goddard Space Flight Center, National Geodetic Survey, United States Army Corps of Engineers

William M. Kaula (May 19, 1926 – April 1, 2000) was an Australian-born American geophysicist and professor at the University of California, Los Angeles. Kaula was most notable for his contributions to geodesy, including using early satellites to produce maps of Earth's gravity. The National Academies Press called Kaula "the father of space-based geodesy". The Los Angeles Times called him "one of the leading planetary physicists of the last four decades".

== Education and early career ==
He graduated from West Point (the top military school in the United States) in 1948 with a B.S. in Military Engineering, then served in the Army Corps of Engineers, leading a topographic survey of New Britain, an island in the Pacific. Kaula received a 1953 M.S. degree from Ohio State University in geodesy. In 1958 he was named chief of the Division of Geodesy of the Army Map Service. From 1960 – 1963 Kaula was a research scientist at NASA Goddard Space Flight Center.

== UCLA professor ==
Kaula was Professor of Geophysics at the Institute for Geophysics and Planetary Physics, UCLA (1963 – 1992). He was a participant in several NASA missions, including as Laser Altimeter principal investigator on Apollo 15, 16, and 17. Kaula was a member of the National Research Council Space Science Board on two occasions. From 1984 – 1987 he led the National Geodetic Survey in the National Oceanic and Atmospheric Administration.

== Honors and legacy ==
He was a fellow (1964) and recipient of the Whitten Medal of the American Geophysical Union, the Brouwer Award of the American Astronomical Society, Guggenheim fellowship (1978), and NASA Medal for exceptional scientific achievement (1983). He was elected to the National Academy of Sciences for his scientific contributions notwithstanding his not having a doctorate, a rare such instance. Asteroid 5485 Kaula is named after him. The American Geophysical Union instituted the William Kaula Award (2003) in his honor.

== Selected publications ==
- Statistical and Harmonic Analysis of Gravity (1959) Journal of Geophysical Research Volume 64, Issue 12
- Analysis of Gravitational and Geometric Aspects of Geodetic Utilization of Satellites (1961) NASA Technical Note D-572
- A Geoid and World Geodetic System based on a combination of gravimetric, astro-geodetic, and satellite data (1961) NASA Technical Note D-702
- Celestial Geodesy (1962) NASA Technical Note D-1155
- A review of geodetic parameters (1963) NASA Technical Note D-1847
- Tesseral harmonics of the gravitational field and geodetic datum shifts derived from camera observations of satellites (1963) Journal of Geophysical Research
- Improved geodetic results from camera observations of satellites (1963) Journal of Geophysical Research
- Determination of the Earth's gravitational field (1963) Reviews of Geophysics Volume 1, Issue 4
- Theory of Satellite Geodesy; applications of satellites to geodesy (1966) Blaisdell Publishing OCLC 638003814
- An Introduction to Planetary Physics; the terrestrial planets (1968) Wiley ISBN 9780471460701
- The Terrestrial Environment: Solid Earth and Ocean Physics (1970) NASA Conference Report 1579
- Geodesy: trends and prospects (1978) National Academies Press
- Applications of Geodesy to Geodynamics: 1. Geodesy for Geodynamics, Progress and Problems (1979) Eos, Transactions of the American Geophysical Union Volume 60, Issue 23
- Earth science: The changing shape of the Earth (1983) Nature Volume 303, Issue 5920:756
- Venus: a contrast in evolution to Earth (1990) Science 247:1191-96
- Constraints on Venus evolution from radiogenic argon (1999) Icarus 139:32-39
