= David Bercovici =

American geophysicist

David A. Bercovici (born in September 1960) is an American geophysicist. He is primarily known for his theoretical explanations of why planet Earth has plate tectonics. He is also known for his development of models of how the Earth's mantle recycles and stores water and how such hydrological processes are involved in Earth's geochemical history.

== Biography ==
Although he was born in Rome, Italy, Bercovici is not Italian by ancestry. He grew up in southern California. He graduated in 1982 from Harvey Mudd College with a B.S. in physics (with a minor in history). At the University of California, Los Angeles (UCLA), he graduated in geophysics and space physics with an M.S. in 1987 and an Ph.D. in 1989. His Ph.D. thesis A Numerical Investigation of Thermal Convection in Highly Viscous Spherical Shells with Applications to Mantle Dynamics in the Earth and Other Terrestrial Planets was supervised by Gerald Schubert. The thesis, which adapted a numerical code introduced by Gary Glatzmaier, was immediately recognized as a breakthrough in realistic modeling of convection in the Earth's mantle. For the academic year 1989–1990 Bercovici was a postdoc at the Woods Hole Oceanographic Institution. From 1990 to 2001 he was a faculty member in the department of geology and geophysics of the University of Hawaiʻi at Mānoa. In the department of geology and geophysics of Yale University, he became in 2001 a professor and was appointed in 2011 to the Frederick William Beinecke Professorship of Geophysics, the academic position which he currently holds. From 2006 to 2012, and again in 2018–2021, he chaired his department. From 2009 to 2012 he was the deputy director of the Yale Climate and Energy Institute, which closed in June 2016. He was a visiting researcher in 1998 at the Institut de Physique du Globe de Paris and a visiting professor in September in 2012 at the École normale supérieure de Lyon and in April 2013 at the University of Cambridge. He is currently the founding co-director of the Yale Center for Natural Carbon Capture.

Bercovici has an international reputation for his expertise in geological fluid dynamics and research on the geodynamics of Earth's mantle and lithosphere. He is the author or co-author of more than 130 scientific articles. His collaboration with Shun-Ichiro Karato is noteworthy. Of particular importances is their 2003 article Whole-mantle convection and the transition-zone water filter, proposing, in relation to the Earth's mantle, the transition-zone water-filter model. Bercovici's collaboration with Yanick Ricard and other colleagues concerning the geophysics of accumulation of weak plate boundaries is important for understanding plate tectonics. David Bercovici, Christoph F. Hieronymus, and other colleagues have also developed models explaining why hotspot volcanoes form discrete and sometimes parallel island chains and explaining why volcanoes oscillate prior to eruptions. As a member of a 19-member team in support of a NASA space mission, Bercovici investigated approaches to imaging and modeling the topography and geomorphology of the asteroid named 16 Psyche.

In 1996 Bercovici was awarded the James B. Macelwane Medal of the American Geophysical Union (AGU) and was also elected a Fellow of the AGU. In 2014 the AGU appointed him the Francis Birch Lecturer. He was elected in 2015 a Fellow of the American Academy of Arts and Sciences (AAAS), in 2018 a Member of the National Academy of Sciences, and in 2019 a Member of the Connecticut Academy of Science and Engineering (CASE). He was awarded in 2022 the Augustus Love Medal of the European Geosciences Union (EGU).

David Bercovici and his wife have two daughters.

== Selected publications ==
=== Articles ===
- Glatzmaier, Gary A.; Schubert, Gerald; Bercovici, Dave (1990). "Chaotic, subduction-like downflows in a spherical model of convection in the Earth's mantle". Nature. 347 (6290): 274–277. Bibcode:1990Natur.347..274G. doi:10.1038/347274a0. S2CID 4318930. 1990
- Olson, Peter; Bercovici, David (1991). "On the equipartition of kinetic energy in plate tectonics". Geophysical Research Letters. 18 (9): 1751–1754. Bibcode:1991GeoRL..18.1751O. doi:10.1029/91GL01840.
- Bercovici, David; Mahoney, John (1994). "Double Flood Basalts and Plume Head Separation at the 660-Kilometer Discontinuity". Science. 266 (5189): 1367–1369. Bibcode:1994Sci...266.1367B. doi:10.1126/science.266.5189.1367. PMID 17772845. S2CID 41075242.
- Bercovici, David (1998). "Generation of plate tectonics from lithosphere–mantle flow and void–volatile self-lubrication". Earth and Planetary Science Letters. 154 (1–4): 139–151. Bibcode:1998E&PSL.154..139B. doi:10.1016/S0012-821X(97)00182-9.
- Hieronymus, Christoph F.; Bercovici, David (1999). "Discrete alternating hotspot islands formed by interaction of magma transport and lithospheric flexure". Nature. 397 (6720): 604–607. Bibcode:1999Natur.397..604H. doi:10.1038/17584. S2CID 4407104.
- Bercovici, D. (2003). "The generation of plate tectonics from mantle convection" (PDF). Earth and Planetary Science Letters. 205 (3–4): 107–121. Bibcode:2003E&PSL.205..107B. doi:10.1016/S0012-821X(02)01009-9.
- Richard, Guillaume C.; Bercovici, David (2009). "Water-induced convection in the Earth's mantle transition zone". Journal of Geophysical Research: Solid Earth. 114 (B1). Bibcode:2009JGRB..114.1205R. doi:10.1029/2008JB005734. S2CID 831387.
- Bercovici, David; Ricard, Yanick (2012). "Mechanisms for the generation of plate tectonics by two-phase grain-damage and pinning". Physics of the Earth and Planetary Interiors. 202–203: 27–55. Bibcode:2012PEPI..202...27B. doi:10.1016/j.pepi.2012.05.003.
- Michaut, Chloé; Ricard, Yanick; Bercovici, David; Sparks, R. Steve J. (2013). "Eruption cyclicity at silicic volcanoes potentially caused by magmatic gas waves". Nature Geoscience. 6 (10): 856–860. Bibcode:2013NatGe...6..856M. doi:10.1038/ngeo1928.
- Bercovici, David; Ricard, Yanick (2014). "Plate tectonics, damage and inheritance". Nature. 508 (7497): 513–516. Bibcode:2014Natur.508..513B. doi:10.1038/nature13072. PMID 24717430. S2CID 4397709.
- Driscoll, P.; Bercovici, D. (2014). "On the thermal and magnetic histories of Earth and Venus: Influences of melting, radioactivity, and conductivity". Physics of the Earth and Planetary Interiors. 236: 36–51. Bibcode:2014PEPI..236...36D. doi:10.1016/j.pepi.2014.08.004.
- Mulyukova, Elvira; Bercovici, David (2019). "The Generation of Plate Tectonics from Grains to Global Scales: A Brief Review". Tectonics. 38 (12): 4058–4076. Bibcode:2019Tecto..38.4058M. doi:10.1029/2018TC005447. S2CID 213990803.
- Gerya, T. V.; Bercovici, D.; Becker, T. W. (2021). "Dynamic slab segmentation due to brittle–ductile damage in the outer rise". Nature. 599 (7884): 245–250. Bibcode:2021Natur.599..245G. doi:10.1038/s41586-021-03937-x. PMID 34759365. S2CID 243987217.

=== Books ===
- Bercovici, David (22 November 2016). The Origins of Everything in 100 Pages (More or Less). Yale University Press. ISBN 9780300224979; ebook
  - Bercovici, David (2016). 2016 hardcover edition. Yale University Press. ISBN 978-0-300-21513-7. LCCN 2016938149; ix+136 pages; illustrations
  - Bercovici, David (22 November 2016). 2020 edition in Kindle Edition format. Yale University Press. ISBN 978-0-300-22497-9.
- Bercovici, David, ed. (17 May 2010). Treatise on Geophysics, Volume 7: Mantle Dynamics. Elsevier. ISBN 978-0-444-53456-9; pbk version of 1st edition; as contributor: Bercovici, D., "Chapter 1. Mantle dynamics past, present, and future: an introduction and overview." in Mantle Dynamics (2007): 1-30 abstract 2007 1st edition. ISBN 978-0-444-51928-3. (with Gerald Schubert as editor-in-chief of the multi-volume series Treatise on Geophysics)
  - Bercovici, D.; Tackley, P.; Ricard, Y. (2015). "7.07-the generation of plate tectonics from mantle dynamics". Treatise on Geophysics, vol. 7 (2nd ed.). Elsevier. pp. 271–318. doi:10.1016/B978-0-444-53802-4.00135-4.
