= Kristie Boering =

American atmospheric chemist

- Born: Kristie Ann Boering; June 10, 1963 (age 63); Redwood City, California
- Education: University of California, San Diego; Stanford University
- Spouse: Ronald C. Cohen
- Scientific career
- Institutions: University of California, Berkeley
- Thesis: Experimental Investigations of Intermolecular Vibrational Energy Transfer: Collisional Excitation and Relaxation of Gas Phase Molecular Ions (1991)
- Doctoral advisor: John I. Brauman
- Website: boeringgroup.weebly.com

Kristie Ann Boering (born October 6, 1963) is a Professor of Earth and Planetary Science and the Lieselotte and David Templeton Professor of Chemistry at University of California, Berkeley. She studies atmospheric chemistry and mass transport in the extraterrestrial atmosphere using kinetics and photochemistry. Boering was elected a member of the National Academy of Sciences in 2018.

== Early life and education ==
Boering is the daughter Shirley Drake Lambeth. She was born in Redwood City, California. Her mother was a Curriculum Coordinator for the San Bernardino County Department of Education. Boering studied at the University of California, San Diego. She earned her bachelor's degree in chemistry, specializing in earth science, magna cum laude in 1985. Boering moved to Stanford University to complete a doctorate in physical chemistry, working with John I. Brauman on non-reactive conditions between gas-phase anions. She was supported by the National Science Foundation and earned her PhD in 1991.

== Research and career ==
Boering was a postdoctoral fellow at Harvard University, where she worked with Steven Wofsy. At Harvard, Boering developed instrumentation to measure carbon dioxide mixing ratios in the upper troposphere. Boering used U-2 spy planes with high-altitude balloons, and made observations in Brazil, New Mexico, Alaska and New Zealand. In 1995 she was a scholar in the Radcliffe Institute for Advanced Study.

Boering was appointed to the faculty at University of California, Berkeley in 1998. She was made an Associate Professor with tenure in 2005. Boering works on photochemical isotope effects. She combines measurements from aircraft, high-altitude balloons and ground-based instruments to study atmospheric chemistry and climate. Boering combines global-scale measurements with computer simulations to study stable isotopes. Boering uses isotopes as tracers of atmospheric chemistry, for example, the triple isotope composition of atmospheric oxygen can be used to monitor biosphere productivity. She has also studied radiocarbon in the stratosphere. She is also interested in two and three-dimensional chemical transport models in the stratosphere. She investigates the exchange between biosphere and atmosphere gases on million and billion year timescales, studying the atmosphere, ice cores and rocks. Boering also studies the climate on other planets.

Boering demonstrated that the use of fertilizer was responsible for dramatic increases in the amount of nitrous oxide in the Earth's atmosphere. She studied firn air, an air sample from antarctic ice that was stored in Cape Grim. By studying the levels of nitrous oxide, Boering identified a well-known seasonal cycle, but surprisingly saw the same thing using isotope-ratio mass spectrometry.

Boering held an honorary professorship at the University of Copenhagen from 2008 to 2013. During 2014 she was an academic visitor at the Earth-Life Science Institute, working with Naohiro Yoshida.

== Awards and honours ==
- 2000 David and Lucile Packard Foundation Fellowship
- 2005 Camille and Henry Dreyfus Foundation Scholar Award
- 2018 Elected into the National Academy of Sciences
- Fellow, American Geophysical Union (2021)

== Personal life ==
Boering is married to Ronald C. Cohen who is Director Berkeley Atmospheric Science Center. Cohen is the son of Adele Cohen. Boering and Cohen have two children, one of whom was born a few days after she submitted her package for tenure.
