= Paul Segall =

Stanford professor in geophysics, studies volcanoes and earthquakes

- Born: California
- Citizenship: U.S.
- Education: B.A./M.S 1976 Case Western Reserve University Ph.D 1981 Stanford University
- Known for: Earthquake and volcanic processes
- Awards: James B. Macelwane Medal (1990) Charles A. Whitten Medal (2014) Member of National Academy of Sciences (2016)
- Scientific career
- Fields: Geophysics/Geology
- Website: https://pangea.stanford.edu/research/CDFM/index.html

Notes
- From National Academy of Science

Paul Segall is a geophysicist best known for his studies on earthquake and volcanism. He is currently a professor in the department of geophysics at Stanford University. He has served on the Board of Directors for the Statewide California Earthquake Center since 2007.

He was elected to fellow of American Geophysical Union in 1990 and member of National Academy of Sciences in 2016.

== Biography ==
Paul was born in California and raised in upstate New York and Cleveland, Ohio. He obtained his BS and MS degrees in Earth Sciences from Case Western Reserve University in 1976. He later graduated from Stanford University with his PhD in Geology in 1981. After that, he worked in USGS for 12 years as a geologist. He joined Stanford geophysics Faculty in 1993, where he has been ever since.

== Research ==
Paul uses crustal deformation measurements to learn how earthquake and volcanic eruptions occur. During and just after earthquakes, his group measures crustal deformation to determine the characteristics of the fault and decipher how elastic strain accumulates in rigid rocks. His team also combines deformation data and eruption data to construct physics-based models of eruption dynamics.

He is the author of the text book Earthquake and Volcano Deformation, which is 'the first text book to present the mechanical models of earthquakes and volcanic processes'.
