= James C. McWilliams =

Modeler

James Cyrus McWilliams
- Citizenship: American
- Education: Harvard University
- Scientific career
- Fields: Oceanic and Atmospheric Modeling
- Workplaces: UCLA
- Thesis: The boundary layer dynamics of symmetric vortices (1971)

James C. McWilliams is a professor at the UCLA Institute of Geophysics and Planetary Physics and Department of Atmospheric and Oceanic Sciences.

== Early life ==
McWilliams was born in Oklahoma City, Oklahoma and attended high school in Tulsa. McWilliams received a B.S. in Applied Mathematics from Caltech in 1968. In 1969 and 1971, he received a M.S. and Ph.D respectively from Harvard University. McWilliams held a Research Fellowship in Geophysical Fluid Dynamics at Harvard from 1971 to 1974 and afterwards worked in the Oceanography Section at the National Center for Atmospheric Research (NCAR) where he became a Senior Scientist in 1980. In 1994, while still retaining part-time appointment at NCAR, he began his work at UCLA where he became the Louis B. Slichter Professor of Earth Sciences in the Department of Atmospheric and Oceanic Sciences and the Institute for Geophysics and Planetary Physics.

He currently teaches graduate student classes including Geophysical Fluid Dynamics, Introduction to Ocean Science, and Atmospheric and Oceanic Turbulence. He has authored the textbook Fundamentals of Geophysical Fluid Dynamics for use by students who have an intermediate to advanced knowledge of physics and the Earth's fluid environment.

== Research ==
James C. McWilliams primarily does research in computational modeling of the Earth's oceans and atmospheres. One of McWilliam's most influential papers was a paper written in 1990 titled "Isopycnal mixing in ocean circulation models", in which together with Peter Gent they proposed a subgrid-scale form of mesoscale eddy mixing on isopyncal surfaces for use in non-eddy resolving ocean circulation models.

=== Selected publications ===
- Large, W. G.; McWilliams, J. C.; Doney, S. C. (1994). "Oceanic vertical mixing: A review and a model with a nonlocal boundary layer parameterization". Reviews of Geophysics. 32 (4): 363–403. Bibcode:1994RvGeo..32..363L. doi:10.1029/94RG01872. ISSN 1944-9208.
- Shchepetkin, Alexander F.; McWilliams, James C. (2005-01-01). "The regional oceanic modeling system (ROMS): a split-explicit, free-surface, topography-following-coordinate oceanic model". Ocean Modelling. 9 (4): 347–404. Bibcode:2005OcMod...9..347S. doi:10.1016/j.ocemod.2004.08.002. ISSN 1463-5003.
- Mcwilliams, James C. (October 1990). "The vortices of two-dimensional turbulence". Journal of Fluid Mechanics. 219 (–1): 361–285. Bibcode:1990JFM...219..361M. doi:10.1017/S0022112090002981. ISSN 0022-1120. S2CID 122274575.

== Awards ==
- Fellow, American Geophysical Union (2001)
- National Academy of Sciences (2002)
