= Gerald Schubert =

American physicist (1939–2025)

- Born: March 2, 1939; New York, U.S.
- Died: August 31, 2025 (aged 86); Woodland Hills, California, U.S
- Education: Cornell University; UC Berkeley
- Scientific career
- Workplaces: UCLA; Cambridge University; Bell Labs
- Notable students: David Bercovici, David Sandwell, David Baker, David Yuen

Gerald 'Jerry' Schubert (March 2, 1939 – August 31, 2025) was an American geophysicist and one of the pioneers of modern geodynamics and planetary physics.

== Early life and career ==
In 1961 he received degrees in engineering physics and aeronautical engineering from Cornell University and in 1964 his Ph.D. in engineering and aeronautical sciences from the University of California, Berkeley. Until 1965 he served as instructor in the Naval Nuclear Power School. He did short research stays at Bell Labs and at DAMTP in Cambridge. In 1966 he began his academic career at the University of California, Los Angeles and became Assistant Professor, in 1970 he was promoted Associate Professor and in 1974 Full Professor of Earth, Planetary, and Space Sciences.

== Research ==
His research has broadly dealt with modeling the structure and dynamics of the interiors and atmospheres and Earth and other planets. He made contributions to the theoretical understanding of planetary interiors, mantle convection, and geophysical fluid dynamics, and co-authored influential texts such as Geodynamics and Mantle Convection in the Earth and Planets.

He played a role in NASA planetary exploration, serving on and contributing to a succession of missions that advanced understanding of the Solar System. He was a member of the Apollo 15 and Apollo 16 magnetometer teams, helping to interpret magnetic and geophysical measurements from the lunar surface, and subsequently participated in the science teams for Pioneer Venus, Magellan, and Galileo missions, where his expertise in planetary interiors, atmospheres, and magnetic fields informed mission science objectives and data analysis.

== Awards ==
- 1969: Alexander von Humboldt Foundation Fellowship
- 1972: Guggenheim Fellow
- 1975: Fellow of the American Geophysical Union (AGU)
- 1975: James B. Macelwane Medal from AGU
- 2001: Fellow of the American Academy of Arts and Sciences
- 2002: Harry Hess Medal from AGU
- 2002: Member of National Academy of Sciences
- 2004: Fellow ot the Institute of Physics
- 2009: Foreign Member of the Academy of Europe

== Publications ==
=== Books ===
- Turcotte, Donald Lawson; Schubert, Gerald (2014). Geodynamics (3rd ed.). Cambridge, United Kingdom: Cambridge University Press. ISBN 978-1-107-00653-9.
- Schubert, Gerald; Turcotte, Donald Lawson; Olson, Peter (2001). Mantle convection in the earth and planets. Cambridge, New York: Cambridge University Press. ISBN 978-0-521-35367-0.

== Personal life ==
He married his wife Joyce in 1960 and had three children, Todd, Michael, and Tamara.

Schubert died on August 31, 2025, at the age of 86.
