= Kristine M. Larson =

American geophysicist

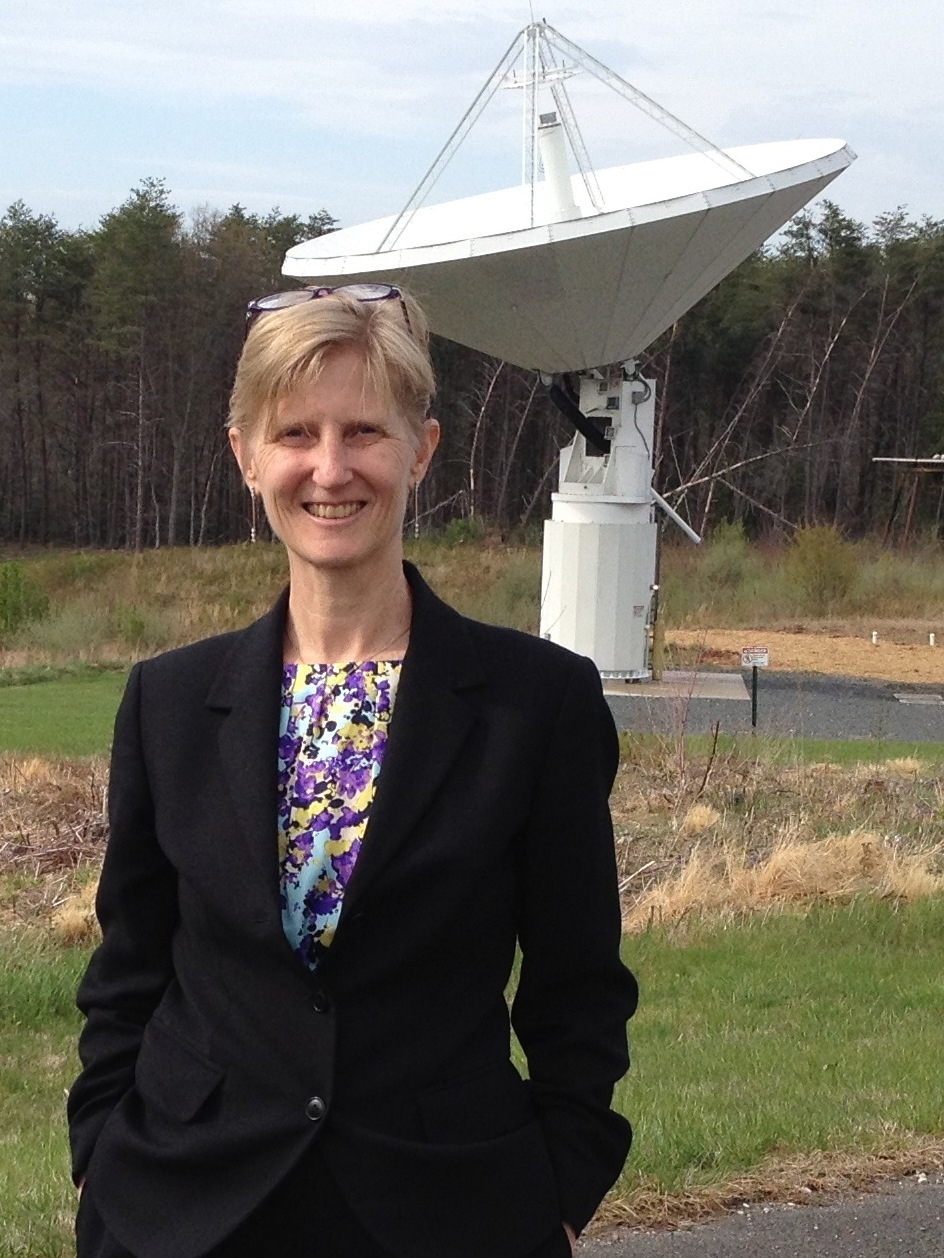
- Born: Southern California, US
- Education: Harvard University (AB); University of California, San Diego (PhD)
- Known for: Geodesy
- Scientific career
- Workplaces: University of Colorado Boulder; Goddard Space Flight Center

Kristine Marie Larson is an American academic. She is Emeritus Professor of Aerospace Engineering at the University of Colorado Boulder. Her research considers the development of algorithms for high-precision Global Positioning System (GPS) data analysis. She was the first to demonstrate that GPS could be used to detect seismic waves. She was awarded the 2015 European Geosciences Union Christiaan Huygens Medal.

== Early life and education ==
Larson was born in Southern California. Her father Valdemar F. Larson, "Swede", worked on the Deep Sea Drilling Project. She studied engineering science and mechanics at Harvard University and graduated in 1985. Larson joined the University of California, San Diego for her doctoral studies, and earned a PhD in geophysics at the Scripps Institution of Oceanography in 1990. Her dissertation evaluated the accuracy of the Global Positioning System (GPS) and was supervised by Duncan Agnew. She was a member of the technical staff at the Jet Propulsion Laboratory, where she worked with the team that developed the GPS infrared positioning system, GIPSY.

== Research and career ==
Larson was appointed to the faculty at the University of Colorado Boulder in 1990. She developed new algorithms for the analysis of Global Positioning System (GPS) data. She used GPS to identify plate velocities, boundary zone deformation and ice sheet motion. She completed a visiting professorship at the Goddard Space Flight Center. Larson started to develop GPS for new applications in geoscience in 2000. She led a team of scientists that was the first to demonstrate that GPS could be used to detect seismic waves in 2003. Her approach was used to evaluate earthquake triggering near the Denali rupture zone. GPS seismology is now used routinely in earth surveillance, including in the monitoring of tsunamis as well as in seismic source models.

Larson has also worked on hydrogeodesy, as well as advising the US Federal Government on geodetic infrastructure. Larson noticed that there were errors caused by the interference of GPS signals, which correlated with the water content in the surfaces close to the receiving antenna. She showed that geodetic GPS receivers can be used to detect the water content of soil, as well as the depth of snow, snow water equivalent, and vegetation water content. She first demonstrated this capability in 2012, when she transformed a GPS network to be capable of interferometric reflectometry (GPS IR). GPS-IR was used in the Earthscope Plate Boundary Observatory.

Larson also showed that it is possible to measure sea level changes, which allows the monitoring of subsidence and ground motion caused by earthquakes. These GPS receivers act as tide gauges, and can be tied to a terrestrial reference frame. She used them to monitor tidal levels in Kachemak Bay, and found that GPS was in good agreement with records from traditional tide gauges. Larson showed that the strength of the GPS signal is correlated to the density of volcanic ash.

In 2015 she became the first woman to win the European Geosciences Union Christiaan Huygens Medal. In 2017 she became a Humboldt Fellow at GFZ German Research Centre for Geosciences. She became an Emeritus Professor at the University of Colorado Boulder in 2018.

=== Awards and honours ===
- 2006: Japan Society for the Promotion of Science Award, University of Tokyo
- 2006: American Geophysical Union Geodesy Award
- 2007: American Geophysical Union Bowie Lecture
- 2011: 150th Jubilee Visiting Professor, Chalmers University of Technology
- 2011: American Geophysical Union Fellow
- 2013: University of Colorado Boulder Faculty Assembly Research Award
- 2014: Fulbright Specialist, Mohammed V University at Agdal
- 2014: Prince Sultan Bin Abdulaziz International Creativity Prize for Water
- 2015: European Geosciences Union Christiaan Huygens Medal
- 2017: Humboldt Foundation Research Prize
- 2017: Chalmers University of Technology Honorary Doctorate
- 2017: University of Colorado Boulder Governor's Award for High Impact Research
- 2018: University of Colorado Boulder Research Lecture
- 2019: Visiting Scholar, Earthquake Research Institute, University of Tokyo
- 2020: Fulbright Research Scholar, University of Tasmania
- 2020: Member of the National Academy of Sciences

=== Selected publications ===
- Larson, Kristine M. (2001). "Present-day crustal deformation in China constrained by global positioning system measurements". Science. 294 (5542): 574–577. Bibcode:2001Sci...294..574W. doi:10.1126/science.1063647. PMID 11641493. S2CID 33498955.
- Larson, Kristine M. (July 12, 2002). "Surface Melt-Induced Acceleration of Greenland Ice-Sheet Flow". Science. 297 (5579): 218–222. Bibcode:2002Sci...297..218Z. doi:10.1126/science.1072708. PMID 12052902. S2CID 37381126.
- Larson, Kristine M. (1997). "GPS measurements of present-day convergence across the Nepal Himalaya". Nature. 388 (6620): 61–64. Bibcode:1997Natur.386...61B. doi:10.1038/386061a0. S2CID 4347587.
