= Kurt Lambeck =

Dutch–Australian geophysicist

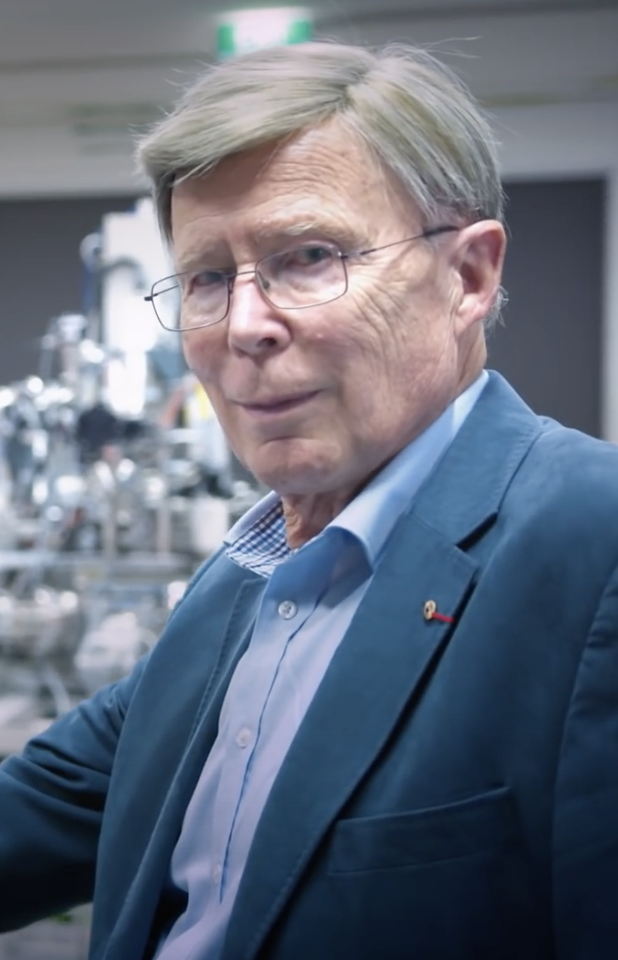
Portrait photograph of Kurt Lambeck for the 2018 Prime Minister's Prize For Science.

Professor Kurt Lambeck AC, FRS, FAA, FRSN (born 20 September 1941 in Utrecht, Netherlands) is Professor of Geophysics at the Australian National University in Canberra, Australia. He has also taught at University of Paris and at Smithsonian and Harvard Observatories.

His current research interests include the interactions between ice sheets, oceans and the solid Earth, as well as changes in ocean levels and their impact on human populations.

== Honours and awards ==
Lambeck was President of the Australian Academy of Science from 2006 to 2010. He is a Fellow of the Royal Society of London and the Royal Society of New South Wales, as well as the recipient of many prestigious international awards. He is a member of the French Academy of Science, the US National Academy of Sciences, the American Academy of Arts and Sciences, Academia Europaea, and the Norwegian Academy of Science and Letters. Lambeck is a foreign member of the Royal Netherlands Academy of Arts and Sciences since 1993.

- 2012 Awarded a prestigious Balzan Prize for his work on Solid Earth Sciences, with emphasis on interdisciplinary research.
- 2013 Made a Chevalier de la Légion d'honneur by the Government of France for his work at Centre national d'études spatiales in the 1970s.
- 2013 Awarded the highest award granted by the Geological Society of London, the Wollaston Medal recognizing lifetime achievements and service.
- 2015 Awarded the Matthew Flinders Medal and Lecture by the Australian Academy of Science
- 2018 Awarded the Prime Minister's Prize for Science
- 2021 Appointed Companion of the Order of Australia
