= List of aquifers in the United States =

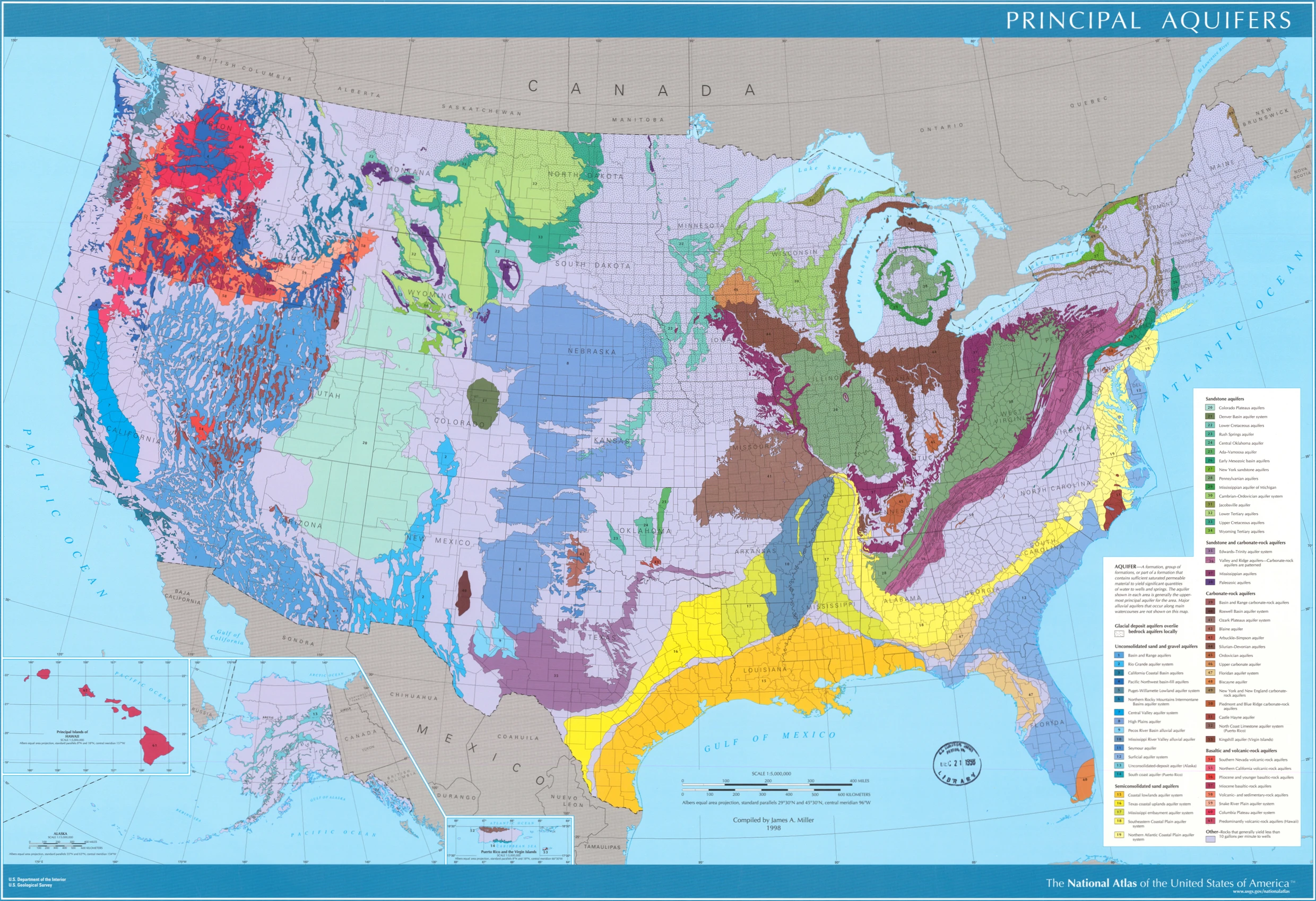
Aquifers of the United States

Withdrawal rates from the Ogallala Aquifer.

This is a list of some aquifers in the United States.

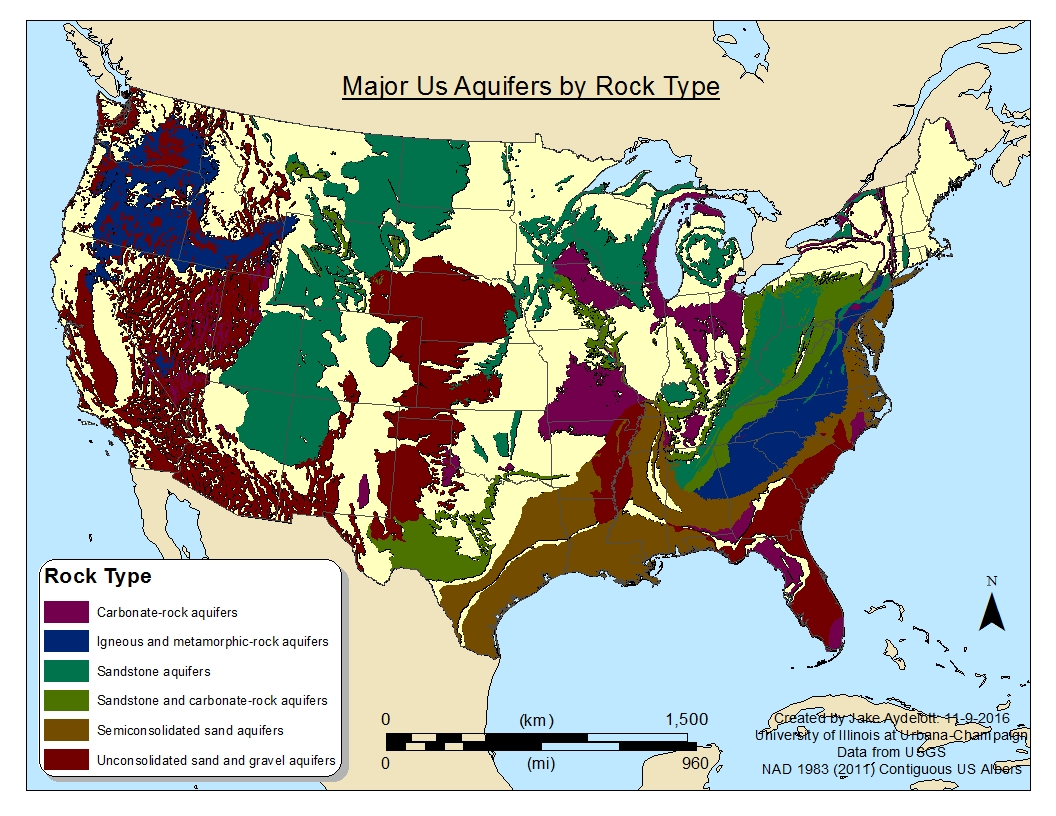
Map of major US aquifers by rock type

An aquifer is a geologic formation, a group of formations, or a part of a formation that contains sufficient saturated permeable material to yield significant quantities of water to groundwater wells and springs.

== List of notable aquifers ==
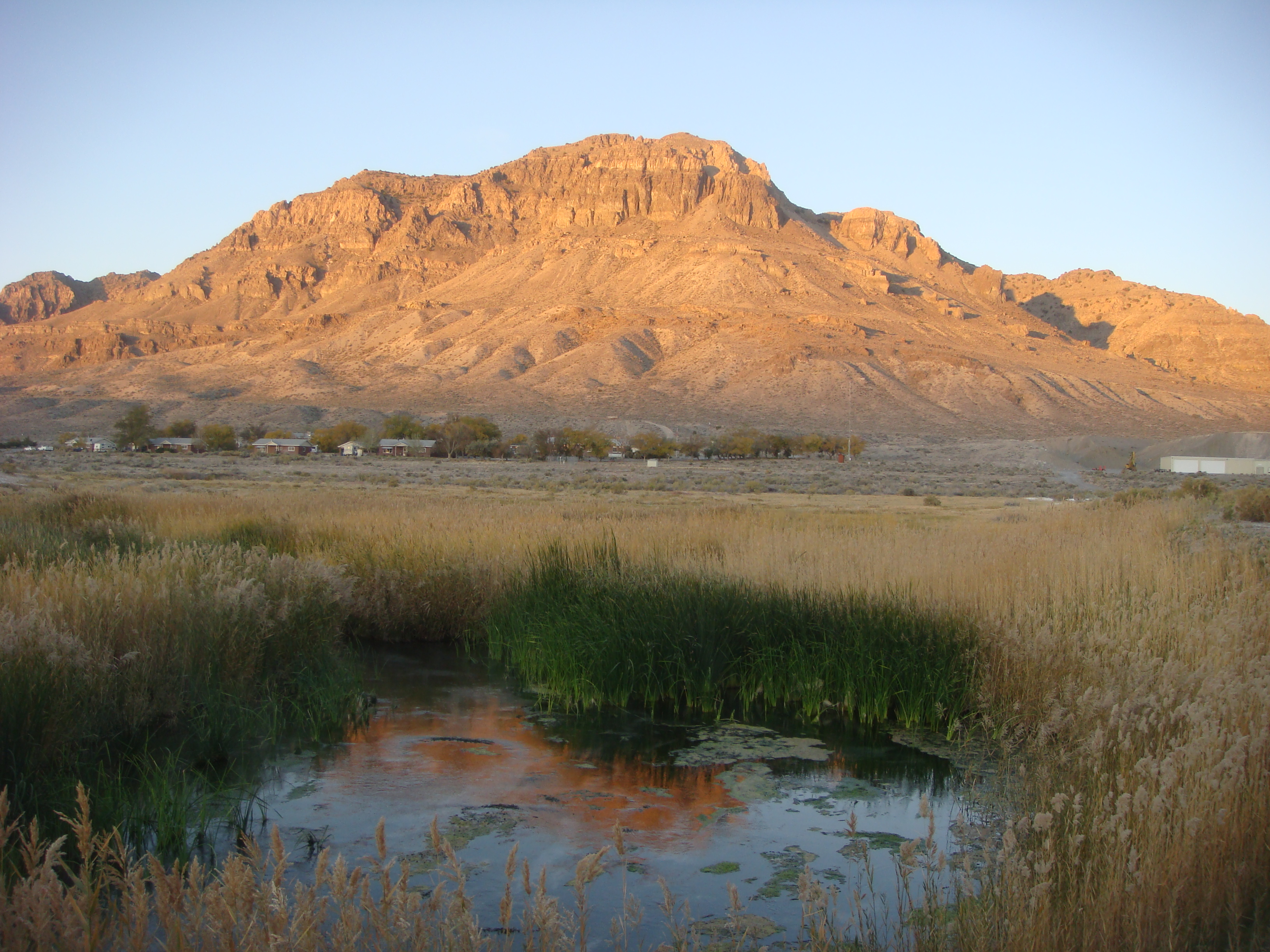
Wetlands contrast the arid landscape around Middle Spring, Fish Springs National Wildlife Refuge, Utah.

- Ogallala Aquifer of the central United States is one of the world's largest aquifers. In places it is being rapidly depleted by growing municipal and continuing agricultural use. This large aquifer, which underlies portions of eight states, contains primarily fossil water from the time of the last glaciation. Annual recharge, in the more arid parts of the aquifer, is estimated to total about 10 percent of annual withdrawals.
- Floridan Aquifer underlies the entire state of Florida as well as southern portions of Alabama, Georgia and South Carolina, and covers an area of 100,000 square miles (258,999 km^{2}). It developed millions of years ago during the late Paleocene to early Miocene periods, when Florida was underwater. It is one of the world's most productive aquifers.
- Edwards Aquifer in Texas is important as a water supply aquifer and is the source of major springs. This carbonate aquifer has historically provided high quality water for nearly two million people, and even today, is completely full due to the high level recharge from a number of streams, rivers and lakes. The primary risk to this resource is human development over the recharge areas.
- Basin and Range Carbonate Aquifer, and known by many names, is an important and unique aquifer in that it covers several western states and basins. Groundwater flows through fractured carbonate rock beneath basins and leads to many regional springs and water features including Fish Springs National Wildlife Refuge and the springs at Death Valley. It has been studied in extensive projects such as the USGS BARCASS report and is controversial due to water issues like that in Snake Valley, Utah.
- Snake River Aquifer in Southern Idaho stretches almost to Yellowstone National Park on its eastern edge and to Hells Canyon along the Idaho Oregon border on the western edge. Water from the aquifer is used to irrigate over 4,600 square miles (12,000 km^{2}) of farmland in Southern Idaho as well as provide drinking water for many Southern Idaho communities.
- Kirkwood–Cohansey Aquifer is located under the New Jersey Pine Barrens of southern New Jersey, and contains 15.35 cubic miles (64 km^{3}) of water.
- Mahomet Aquifer supplies water to some 800,000 people in central Illinois and contains approximately 4 cubic miles (17 km^{3}) of water. The Mahomet Aquifer Consortium was formed in 1998 to study the aquifer with hopes of ensuring the water supply and reducing potential user conflicts.
- San Diego Formation, an aquifer used for public water supply in San Diego County, California and Los Angeles, California.
- Turlock Basin, underlies the San Joaquin River in the San Joaquin Valley of central California. One of the largest aquifers in the Western United States.
- The state of Washington has numerous large aquifers, monitored by the state's Department of Ecology.
- Spokane Valley–Rathdrum Prairie Aquifer covers 325 square miles (842 km^{2}) in eastern Washington and Idaho. It provides drinking water for some 700,000 people.
- Central Valley Basin of California originates a vast amount of US crops for domestic consumption and export. An estimated 2,700 cubic kilometres (648 mi^{3}) of accessible "fresh" water remain when deep well sources included in the eight counties of the study, some of which may be polluted by oil activities, some of which may be briny, nevertheless it is larger than the 900–1,000 cubic kilometres (216–240 mi^{3}) thought to have been present. In spite of apparent windfall, ground subsidence, unregulated drilling, water-hungry high-profit agriculture and prolonged drought remain major obstacles to sustainability. Since farming developed n the valley a century ago, over a 100 cubic kilometres (24 mi^{3}) are thought to have been permanently lost as compacted clays cannot reabsorb water. Some 10 cubic kilometres (2 mi^{3}) were being lost annually both years of 2012–2013 according to GRACE satellite measurements.
- Abbotsford–Sumas Aquifer in northern Washington state

== See also ==
- Aquifers & groundwater-related topics
- Groundwater
- Groundwater pollution
- Groundwater recharge
- Groundwater-related subsidence
