= Zoback =

Zoback is a surname. Notable people with the surname include:

- Mark Zoback (fl. 2000), American geophysicist
- Mary Lou Zoback (born 1952), American geophysicist
