= Norman Sleep =

American geophysicist and professor of geophysics

Norman H. Sleep (born 14 February 1945) is an American geophysicist and professor of geophysics at Stanford University. He has done internationally recognized research on plate tectonics and many other areas of geology and planetology.

== Education and career ==
In 1967, Sleep graduated with a B.S. in mathematics from Michigan State University. He then studied geophysics at Massachusetts Institute of Technology (MIT), where he earned his master's degree in 1969 and a doctorate in geophysics in 1973. After a brief period as a postdoctoral research associate at MIT, he joined Northwestern University in 1973 where he was an assistant professor of geophysics until 1979. He was from 1979 to 1984 an associate professor and from 1984 to 1993 a full professor of geophysics and geology at Stanford University. Since 1993 he has been a professor of geophysics there.

== Research ==
Since 1969, Sleep has done research on mid-ocean ridges. He first demonstrated the temperature dependence of the ratio of water depth to the age of the underlying ocean floor and developed models that showed the great influence of the circulation of hydrothermal fluids on the chemistry of the seawater and the structure of the ridges. In the 1970s he explored the formation of stretched continental margins. He measured the subsidence rate, which can be determined from thickness and age of deposited sedimentary rock, and found that the subsidence history was not affected by the subsidence history of oceanic crust.

Sleep was the first to realize that the stratigraphic sequence on passive continental margins could be modeled by deposition on a thermally subsiding rifted margin. His idea also had considerable implications for hydrocarbon exploration along margins and in continental interior basins.

Further areas of research were island arcs and subduction zones, the composition of the atmosphere, as well as impact events affecting the entire planet. In addition, he explored the mechanisms of geological disturbances, and was able to prove the great influence of water on their movements.

In the mid-1970s, he began research on magmatism, and until the early 1990s, dealt with the temperature history of the Earth's mantle. He also studied the formation and composition of mantle plumes, as they exist under Hawaii. Until the mid-1990s, he worked on transferring his findings in the field of magmatism to Mars and, with Roger J. Phillips, developed a model for the Tharsis region.

== Honors and awards ==
Sleep has received numerous honors and awards:

- 1980 James B. Macelwane Medal of the American Geophysical Union
- 1980 Fellow of the American Geophysical Union
- 1984 Fellow of the Geological Society of America
- 1991 George P. Woollard Prize of the Geological Society of America
- 1993 Fellow of the American Association for the Advancement of Science
- 1997 Alfred Wegener Medal of the European Union of Geosciences
- 1998 Walter H. Bucher Medal of the American Geophysical Union
- 1999 Member of the National Academy of Sciences
- 2008 Wollaston Medal

== Selected publications ==
- Norman H. Sleep and Kazuya Fujita: "Principles of Geophysics." John Wiley and Sons, 1997, ISBN 978-0-86542-076-2, 608 pages.
- with Euan G. Nisbet: "The habitat and nature of early life." Nature 409, no. 6823 (2001): 1083–1091, doi:10.1038/35059210
- with Kevin Zahnle: "Carbon dioxide cycling and implications for climate on ancient Earth." Journal of Geophysical Research: Planets 106, no. E1 (2001): 1373–1399, doi:10.1029/2000JE001247
- with K. Zahnle and Philip S. Neuhoff: "Initiation of clement surface conditions on the earliest Earth." Proceedings of the National Academy of Sciences of the United States of America 98, no. 7 (2001): 3666–3672, doi:10.1073/pnas.071045698
- with A. Meibom, Th Fridriksson, R. G. Coleman, and D. K. Bird: "H_{2}-rich fluids from serpentinization: geochemical and biotic implications." Proceedings of the National Academy of Sciences of the United States of America 101, no. 35 (2004): 12818–12823, doi:10.1073/pnas.0405289101
- with K. Zahnle: "Impacts and the early evolution of life." In Comets and the Origin and Evolution of Life, pp. 207–251. Springer, Berlin, Heidelberg, 2006.
- with Minik T. Rosing, Dennis K. Bird, William Glassley, and Francis Albarede: "The rise of continents—An essay on the geologic consequences of photosynthesis." Paleogeography, Palaeoclimatology, Paleoecology 232, nos. 2–4 (2006): 99–113, doi:10.1016/j.palaeo.2006.01.007
- with Kevin Zahnle, Nick Arndt, Charles Cockell, Alex Halliday, Euan Nisbet, and Franck Selsis: "Emergence of a habitable planet." Space Science Reviews 129, no. 1–3 (2007): 35–78, doi:10.1007/s11214-007-9225-z
- with Minik T. Rosing, Dennis K. Bird, and Christian J. Bjerrum: "No climate paradox under the faint early Sun." Nature 464, no. 7289 (2010): 744–747, doi:10.1038/nature08955
- with Darcy E. Ogden: "Explosive eruption of coal and basalt and the end-Permian mass extinction." Proceedings of the National Academy of Sciences of the United States of America 109, no. 1 (2012): 59–62, doi:10.1073/pnas.1118675109
