= Lynn Sykes =

American seismologist and geophysicist

Lynn Ray Sykes
- Born: 1937 (age 88–89); Pittsburgh, Pennsylvania, United States
- Education: Massachusetts Institute of Technology (BSc, 1959, MS 1960); Columbia University (PhD)
- Awards: James B. Macelwane Medal (1970); Walter H. Bucher Medal (1975); John Wesley Powell Award (1991); H F Reid Medal (1997); Vetlesen Prize (2000)
- Scientific career
- Fields: Plate Tectonics, Seismology, Geophysics
- Workplaces: Columbia University
- Thesis: The propagation of short-period seismic surface waves across oceanic areas (1965)
- Doctoral advisor: Jack Oliver

Lynn Ray Sykes is an American seismologist who has made important contributions to theory of plate tectonics through his work on transform faults and subduction. He was awarded the Vetlesen Prize in 2000.

== Life and career ==
Sykes was born in Pittsburgh, Pennsylvania in 1937 and grew up near Washington, DC. He was an undergraduate at the Massachusetts Institute of Technology in the 1950s, graduating with a bachelor’s degree in geology and geophysics in 1959, and a masters in 1960. He then moved to Columbia University to study for a doctorate, where he worked on earthquakes along the oceanic ridges. He completed his doctorate in 1965, and remained at the Lamont Doherty Earth Observatory, continuing his work in seismology and on the nature of the transform faults that cross the mid-ocean ridge system. He described the context to some of these discoveries in a tribute to Walter Pitman III.

In 1968, Sykes published a paper jointly with his Lamont colleagues Jack Oliver and Bryan Isacks, which showed that observations from seismology provided strong support for the newly emerging theory of plate tectonics. Sykes’ later work has included the application of seismology for the verification of nuclear test ban treaties and nuclear arms control.

== Recognition ==
Sykes contributions to seismology, plate tectonics and earthquake hazards have been recognised through multiple medals, awards and elections to membership or fellowship of a number of national academies.

Sykes was awarded the James B. Macelwane Medal of the American Geophysical Union in 1970, and the Walter H. Bucher Medal in 1975. Sykes received the John Wesley Powell Award from the United States Geological Survey in 1991 for his efforts to reduce hazards from earthquakes through his work with the US Geological Survey’s National Earthquake Hazards Reduction Program. Sykes was awarded the Harry Fielding Reid medal, the senior award of the Seismological Society of America, in 1997.

In 2000, Sykes was awarded the Vetlesen Prize along with Walter Pitman and Jason Morgan, for work that “helped establish geology's unifying theory of plate tectonics”.

Sykes was elected to the United States’ National Academy of Sciences in 1978, and to the American Academy of Arts and Sciences in 1979. He is a Fellow of the Geological Society of America and of the American Geophysical Union. In 1988, Sykes was awarded a Guggenheim Fellowship, to work in New Zealand, and in 2018 he was awarded the honorary degree of Doctor of Science from Columbia University.
