= Aykut Barka =

Turkish scientist (1951-2002)

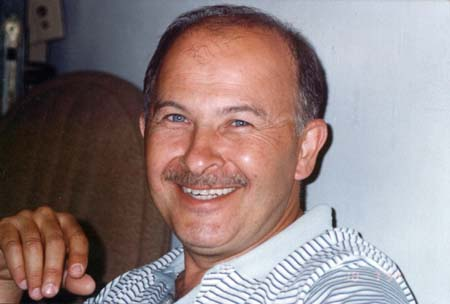
- Born: December 16, 1951; Fatih, Istanbul
- Died: February 1, 2002 (aged 50)
- Education: Istanbul University
- Known for: North Anatolian Fault Zone
- Scientific career
- Fields: Seismology
- Workplaces: Istanbul Technical University
- Doctoral advisor: Dr. P.L. Hancock, University of Bristol

Aykut Barka (December 16, 1951, Fatih, Istanbul – February 1, 2002) was a Turkish geoscientist specialized in seismology. He is best known for his contributions to understanding the behaviour of the North Anatolian Fault Zone (NAFZ), one of the most dangerous active faults in the world.

== Biography ==
Barka was born in Fatih district of Istanbul in 1951 and received his PhD degree in 1981 from the University of Bristol, UK under the supervision of Dr. P.L. Hancock with a thesis on "Seismotectonic Aspects of the North Anatolian Fault Zone".

He worked and studied geosciences in some top rated institutions around the world, including Institut de Physique du Globe de Paris, École Normale Supérieure Paris, MIT's Earth Resources Laboratory, Cambridge, MA, University of Bristol, UK and Geological Survey of Japan.

In 1997, Barka published a paper with Ross Stein and James H. Dieterich of USGS, titled "Progressive failure on the North Anatolian Fault since 1939 by earthquake stress triggering", which showed the migration of large earthquakes and, not surprisingly, positive stress accumulation in the Marmara Region. Only two years after this paper was published, the M7.4 1999 İzmit earthquake hit the Marmara Region, killing more than 17,000 people.

Aykut Barka died on February 1, 2002, from injuries suffered in a car accident five weeks earlier. He left a wife and two young children.

== Bibliography ==
- Stein, R. S.; Barka, A. A.; Dieterich, J. H. (1997), "Progressive failure on the North Anatolian fault since 1939 by earthquake stress triggering", Geophysical Journal International, 128 (3), Oxford University Press: 594–604, Bibcode:1997GeoJI.128..594S, doi:10.1111/j.1365-246x.1997.tb05321.x
