= Susan Seacrest =

American environmental activist and teacher

Susan Schroeder Seacrest
- Born: 1953 (age 72–73); Lincoln, Nebraska
- Education: St. Olaf College (BA); University of Rochester (M.Ed.)
- Occupations: Teacher, environmental activist
- Known for: Founder of the Groundwater Foundation
- Awards: Heinz Award; John Wesley Powell Award

Susan Seacrest is an American environmental activist and teacher who is an advocate for groundwater protection. She is the founder of the Groundwater Foundation, a nonprofit dedicated to educating people about threats to public drinking water.

== Early life and education ==
Seacrest was born in 1953 in Lincoln, Nebraska. She graduated from Lincoln Southeast High School in 1971 and holds a Bachelor of Arts degree from St. Olaf College and a Master of Science in Education from the University of Rochester.

== Career ==
Seacrest worked as a teacher and guidance counselor for the Lincoln Public Schools in Nebraska. In 1985, her son developed an illness that was not immediately diagnosed. His illness was eventually determined to be Non-Hodgkin lymphoma and he recovered within a year. After learning that a study found a high rate of occurrence of this type of lymphoma in the Platte River Valley, Seacrest reached out to the study's author who encouraged her to do her own research on water issues in Nebraska. This led her to found the Groundwater Foundation, a nonprofit organization dedicated to educating people about threats to public drinking water.

Seacrest served as president of the foundation from its inception through her retirement in 2007. It is credited with educating the public on the need to protect drinking water and reducing nitrate levels within the Platte River Basin. She has been cited for her expertise on Nebraska's Ogallala Aquifer and her lifetime of work on groundwater issues. Seacrest has served on both the National Drinking Water Advisory Council and the Children's Health Protection Advisory Council.

After retiring from the foundation, Seacrest returned to teaching. In 2021, she was appointed to the Lower Platte South Natural Resources District board of directors.

== Awards and honors ==
- In 1989, Seacrest was awarded the JL Higgins Award for her dedication to groundwater
- In 1994, Seacrest was the recipient of the John Wesley Powell Award from the United States Geological Survey
- In 1999, Seacrest was named as one of seven "Heroes for the Planet" by Time magazine
- In 2007, Seacrest received the Heinz Award in honor of her environmental achievements

== See also ==
- Drinking water quality in the United States
- Nitrate vulnerable zone
