= John Wesley Powell Award =

Award conferred by the United States Geological Survey

The John Wesley Powell Award is a United States Geological Survey (USGS) honor award that recognizes an individual or group, not employed by the U.S. federal government, for noteworthy contributions to the objectives and mission of the USGS.

The award is named for John Wesley Powell, the distinguished scientist and explorer who was the second director of the USGS, serving from 1881 to 1894, and who made the pioneer exploration of the Colorado River. The first award was given in 1971.

== Awardees ==
1971

- George R. Shanklin, retired Director of Division of Water Policy and Supply, State of New Jersey (State and Local Government)
- Raymond J. Heringer, Director of the work experience program at Ravenswood High School, East Palo Alto, California (Private Citizen)

1972

- Wallace W. Hagan, Director and State Geologist, Kentucky Geological Survey (State and Local Government)
- C. R. Baskin, Chief Engineer, Texas Water Development Board (State and Local Government)
- L. J. (Bud) Maher, Assistant Publisher, Huron Daily Plainsman, Huron, South Dakota (Private Citizen)

1976

- David M. Evans, Geologic Engineer from Colorado School of Mines (Industry)
- R. S. "Rock" Howard, Executive Secretary of Georgia Water Quality Control Board (State and Local Government)
- Susanne B. Wilson, Councilwoman of City of San Jose, California (Private Citizen)
- Dr. Clarence J. Velz, Professor Emeritus, University of Michigan (Academia)

1978

- John P. Snyder, privately employed chemical engineer, Madison, New Jersey (Private Citizen)

1981

- Professor Thomas H. Pigford, University of California (Academia)
- Kazutaka Saiki (State and Local Government)

1983

- S. L. Groff, Montana Bureau of Mines and Geology, Butte, Montana (State and Local Government)

1986

- Abel Wolman, Emeritus Professor, Johns Hopkins University, Baltimore, Maryland School of Engineering and School of Hygiene and Public Health (Academia)
- Stephen E. Reynolds, New Mexico State Engineer (State and Local Government)

1988

- Dr. Hugo F. Thomas, Director and State Geologist, Department of Environmental Protection, Hartford, Connecticut (State and Local Government)
- John McPhee (Private Citizen)
- Dr. Harold Moellering, Ohio State University, Columbus, Ohio (Academia)

1989

- Dr. M. Gordon Wolman, Chairman, Department of Geography and Environmental Engineering, Johns Hopkins University, Baltimore, Maryland (Academia)
- Duane M. Hamann, San Miguel, California (Private Citizen)

1990

- Genevieve Atwood, Director/State Geologist for Utah (State and Local Government)
- Walter S. Sullivan, Science Editor for The New York Times (Private Citizen)
- Glass Instruments, Inc. (Industry)

1991

- Michael T. Halbouty (Private Citizen)
- Dr Lynn Sykes, Columbia University (Academia)
- Paleontology Team, Unocal Corporation's North America Oil and Gas Division, Ventura, California (Industry)

1992

- A. Ivan Johnson (Private Citizen)
- Professor Carl Kisslinger, University of Colorado (Academia)
- Ray A. Miller, Idaho State Mapping Advisory Committee and Idaho Geographic Information Advisory Committee (State and Local Government)

1993

- Dr. James F. Pankow, Department of Environmental Science and Engineering, Oregon Graduate Institute of Science and Technology (Academia)
- InterNetwork Inc. (Industry)
- California Department of Transportation (State and Local Government)
- InterNetwork Inc.

1994

- Susan Seacrest, President of the Groundwater Foundation (Private Citizen)
- William R. Walker, Virginia Water Resources Research Center and Virginia Polytechnic Institute and State University (Academia)
- Dr. Kenneth N. Weaver, Maryland Geological Survey (State and Local Government)

1995

- Dr. George M. Hornberger, Department of Environmental Science, University of Virginia (Academia)
- Alfred H. Vang, Deputy Director, South Carolina Department of Natural Resources (State and Local Government)

1996

- W. Jacquelyn Kious (Private Citizen)
- Nancy L. Parke (Societies and Associations)
- Jack Dangermond, Environmental Systems Research Institute (Industry)
- Tri-County Regional Planning Commission (State and Local Government)

1997

- Dr. James Merchant, Associate Professor, University of Nebraska–Lincoln, (Educational Institution)
- James M. Harrison, Minnesota-Wisconsin Boundary Area Commission (State and Local Government)
- National Stone Association (Societies and Associations)
- Lawrence E. Callender (Private Citizen)

1998

- Dr. Samuel S. Adams (Private Citizen)
- Richard Burton, Monroe County Department of Health, Monroe County Environmental Health Lab (State and Local Government)
- Paul Deshler, Northern Arizona University (Educational Institution)
- Garruba, Dennis, Konetzka (Industry)

1999

- California Division of Mines and Geology, California Department of Conservation (State and Local Government)
- George A. Thompson, Department of Geophysics, Stanford University, Stanford, California (Private Citizen)
- Harlan Tucker, Executive Director, The Friends of the Patuxent Wildlife Research Center, Inc. (Societies and Associations)

2000

- Lloyd S. Cluff, Manager, Geosciences Department, Pacific Gas & Electric Company, San Francisco, California (Private Citizen)
- Susan Carson Lambert, Director, Kentucky Office of Geographic Information, Frankfort, Kentucky (State and Local Government)
- Dr. James N. Gray, Senior Researcher and Manager, Microsoft Bay Area Research Center, San Francisco, California (Industry)
- Thomas D. Barclay, Lead Developer, Microsoft Bay Area Research Center, San Francisco, California (Industry)

2001

- Dr. Emery T. Cleaves, Director, Maryland Geological Survey, Baltimore, Maryland (State and Local Government)
- Robert Dean, Vantage Point Productions, LLC, Los Angeles, California (Industry)
- Captain Edward K. Miller, Senior Pilot (retired), Air Lines Pilots Association (Private Citizen)
- Dr. Paul "Ty" Ferre, Assistant Professor, Department of Hydrology and Water Resources, Tucson, Arizona (Academia)

2003

- Dr. William J. Plant, Applied Physics Laboratory, University of Washington, Seattle, Washington (Educational Institution)
- American Geological Institute, Government Affairs Program, Alexandria, Virginia (Societies and Associations)
- Delaware Data Mapping and Integration Laboratory (DataMIL), University of Delaware, Newark, Delaware (State and Local Government)

2004

- Dr. Gerald E. Galloway, Titan Corporation, Vice President, Enterprise Engineering Group, Reston, Virginia (Industry)
- Dr. Dennis Helder, Department of Electrical Engineering and Computer Science, South Dakota State University, Brookings, South Dakota (Educational Institution)
- David Perlman, Science Editor, San Francisco Chronicle, San Francisco, California (Private Citizens/Groups/Organizations)
- Ian Von Essen, Spokane County Information Systems, Spokane, Washington (State and Local Government)

2005

- Dr. Keith C. Clarke, University of California, Santa Barbara (Educational Institution)
- Dr. William L. Graf, University of South Carolina (Educational Institution)
- Larry A. Larson, Association of State Floodplain Managers (Societies and Associations)
- USGS Coalition, (Robert Gropp, American Institute of Biological Sciences; Linda Rowan, American Geological Institute; Craig Schiffries, National Council for Science and the Environment) (Private Citizens/Groups/Organizations)

2006

- Dr. Samuel Goward, Department of Geography, University of Maryland (Educational Institution)
- Illinois Department of Natural Resources – Office of Water Resources (State and Local Government)

2007

- Dr. Walter J. Arabasz of the University of Utah (Private Citizen)

2008

- Loren L. Turner, P.E., of the California Department of Transportation (Caltrans)

2009

- Dr. Mary Skopec of the Iowa Department of Natural Resources (State and Local Government)
- Dr. James L. Smith of The Nature Conservancy (Private Citizen)

2011

- Robert B. Smith of the University of Utah

2016

- John Galetzka, TLALOCNet Project Manager of UNAVCO

== See also ==
- List of geology awards
