= Jack Oliver (scientist) =

American scientist

John Ertle Oliver
- Born: September 26, 1923; Massillon, Ohio, US
- Died: January 5, 2011 (aged 87); Ithaca, New York, US
- Education: Columbia University
- Awards: Walter H. Bucher Medal (1981); Penrose Medal (1998)
- Scientific career
- Fields: Seismology
- Doctoral students: Bryan Isacks; Lynn Sykes

John "Jack" Ertle Oliver (September 26, 1923 – January 5, 2011) was an American scientist. Oliver, who earned his PhD at Columbia University in 1953, studied earthquakes and ultimately provided seismic evidence supporting plate tectonics. In the 1960s, Oliver and his former graduate student, Bryan Isacks, set up seismographic stations in the South Pacific to record earthquake activity, and the data collected led to the insight that part of the ocean floor was being pushed downward.

== Early life and years at Columbia ==
Jack Oliver was born in Massillon, Ohio, and was a member of the Massillon Washington High School football team coached by future Pro Football Hall of Fame coach Paul Brown. He attended Columbia on a football scholarship, interrupted by his service with the United States Navy as a Seabee in the South Pacific during World War II. After completing his military service, he returned to Columbia, earning his bachelor's degree in 1947. He then went on to earn a master's degree in physics there and, in 1953, a PhD in geophysics at Columbia's Lamont–Doherty Earth Observatory.

Oliver's work on using seismic waves to detect nuclear explosions led to his being invited to serve as an advisor to the White House on nuclear test-ban treaties in 1958 and 1959.

It was during Oliver's years at Columbia that he and his students Bryan Isacks and Lynn Sykes undertook the research leading to their 1968 paper, “Seismology and the New Global Tectonics,” which provided strong evidence for the acceptance of plate tectonics. The paper was based on the findings of earthquakes hundreds of miles under the Pacific Ocean found using a network of seismic detectors that Oliver and his team had placed on Fiji and Tonga. The research by Oliver's team led them to conclude that the collision of tectonic plates was forcing material deep into the earth where they met below the Pacific Ocean, and provided strong evidence of the existence of continental drift, a theory that had been largely scoffed at by the scientific community when it was first proposed by Alfred Wegener in 1912. The order of the three coauthors' names on that paper (Isacks, Oliver, Sykes) was decided by lot, according to a footnote on the paper. This odd choice provoked speculation, but Oliver explained that decision was made before writing the paper, as all three authors worked full speed in what they saw as a race against other researchers.

Oliver headed the Lamont seismology program for many years, and was chair of Columbia's Department of Geology from 1969 to 1971.

== Years at Cornell ==
In 1971, Oliver went to Cornell University, where he became chair of the geophysics department. Oliver was eager to use reflection seismology techniques to probe the deep structure of continents, but many were skeptical of this approach because at that time refraction profiling was the standard way to examine crustal structures.

With Cornell colleague Sidney Kaufman, Oliver co-founded the first national program using reflection seismology to explore Earth's continental crust. The Consortium for Continental Reflection Profiling (COCORP) was initially funded by a small grant from the NSF. It has been used to map geological faults in many parts of the US, and has served as a model for seismic exploration projects in more than 20 other countries.

== Personal life ==
Oliver met his wife Gay van der Hoeven on a hike near New York City, and they were married in 1964. The couple raised two daughters, Nell and Amy.

In addition to his scientific work, Oliver enjoyed creating limericks, such as this one from his 1996 book Shocks and Rocks:

The plates in dynamic mosaic
Through history both fresh and archaic
Like bold engineers
For some two billion years
Have kept Earth from becoming prosaic.

== Publications ==
- Isacks, Bryan; Oliver, Jack; Sykes, Lynn R. (1968). "Seismology and the New Global Tectonics". Journal of Geophysical Research. 73 (18): 5855. Bibcode:1968JGR....73.5855I. doi:10.1029/JB073i018p05855.
