= Mary Lou Zoback =

American geophysicist and seismologist

- Born: Mary Lou Chetlain; July 5, 1952 (age 74); Sanford, Florida
- Education: Stanford University
- Awards: James B. Macelwane Medal (1987); Arthur L. Day Medal (2007)
- Scientific career
- Fields: Geophysics, seismology
- Workplaces: United States Geological Survey
- Thesis: Mid-miocene rifting in north-central Nevada: A detailed study of late cenozoic deformation in the northern basin and range (1978)
- Doctoral advisor: George A. Thompson

Mary Lou Zoback (née Chetlain; born July 5, 1952) is an American geophysicist and seismologist. A specialist in tectonic stress and natural hazards risks, she spent most of her career as a research scientist with the United States Geological Survey. Zoback chaired the World Stress Map project of the International Lithosphere Program from 1986 to 1992. Zoback served on the U.S. Nuclear Waste Technical Review Board from 2012 to 2018.

== Early life and education ==
Mary Lou Chetlain was born on July 5, 1952, in Sanford, Florida. Her father Kent Chetlain was a sports editor with the Bradenton Herald and as a teenager, she operated the McKechnie Field electronic scoreboard during Pittsburgh Pirates spring training games.

She began her undergraduate studies in oceanography at the Florida Institute of Technology. After taking a course on plate tectonics and elasticity, she met geophysicist Allan V. Cox at a meeting on solar magnetism in Cape Canaveral. Following his recommendation, she transferred to Stanford University in her junior year, receiving a full scholarship. At Stanford she earned a Bachelor of Science degree in 1974, a Master of Science degree in 1975, and a Ph.D. in 1978, all in geophysics. Her doctoral thesis was titled "Mid-miocene rifting in north-central Nevada: A detailed study of late cenozoic deformation in the northern basin and range". Her advisor was George Thompson.

== Career ==
Following her graduation, Zoback conducted postdoctoral research from 1978 to 1979 with the United States Geological Survey (USGS) through a National Research Council fellowship. She worked with the Heat Flow Studies group, conducting research on tectonic deformation in northern Nevada. In 1979, she joined the USGS as a research geophysicist in the office of the Western Earthquake Hazards Team.

Zoback created a map of tectonic stress fields for the Western U.S. states, later extending the map with colleagues to include the contiguous United States. According to Zoback, the work demonstrated "that broad regions of the Earth’s crust in the U.S. were subjected to a uniformly oriented stress field and resulted from large-scale tectonic processes". Zoback was approached by the president of the International Lithosphere Program with the idea of creating a global map for stress fields.

From 1986 to 1992, Zoback chaired the International Lithosphere Program's World Stress Map project, an open-access public database. The project had the objective of inferring the relative magnitudes of forces that act on the lithosphere. Zoback coordinated the compilation and interpretation of geophysical and geologic data on tectonic stress fields with dozens of scientists from over 30 countries. The project led to a special issue of the Journal of Geophysical Research in 1992 for which Zoback was guest editor.

Zoback was a member of the National Research Council's United States Geodynamics Committee from 1985 to 1989. and the NSF review panel for the continental dynamics program. She is a past member of the council and executive board of the Geological Society of America (GSA) and she served as president of the GSA's Tectonophysics Section in 2000.

In 1990 Zoback received a Gilbert Fellowship Award from the USGS for a yearlong sabbatical in Karlsruhe, Germany.

Zoback was the chief scientist of the USGS Earthquake Hazards team beginning in 1999. She oversaw the study "Earthquake Probabilities in the San Francisco Bay Region, 2002-2031". She was a USGS Senior Research Scientist from 2002 to 2006 and developed an integrated hazards research program for Northern California.

From 2006 to 2011, Zoback served as vice president for Earthquake Risk Applications with Risk Management Solutions, a Bay Area catastrophe modeling firm. She developed risk models to examine the role that earthquake insurance has in society and to quantify the effects of risk reduction and disaster management.

At Stanford University, she was a consulting professor in the Geophysics Department starting in 2011.

Zoback was appointed to the U.S. Nuclear Waste Technical Review Board by President Barack Obama on September 25, 2012. The board provides scientific and technical oversight of the Department of Energy's program for managing and disposing of high-level nuclear waste and spent nuclear fuel.

== Research ==
Zoback's principal area of research is active tectonics, with an emphasis on the relationship between tectonic stress fields and the incidence of earthquakes. Her studies have focused on the San Andreas Fault system, the Basin and Range Province, and intraplate regions. Her work has involved quantifying natural hazard risks as well as developing strategies for risk reduction and metrics for disaster resilience.

Zoback dedicated a large part of her studies to the San Andreas Fault system from 1986 to 1992. She worked on the connection between earthquakes and large strike-slip faults. Through a reanalysis of the 1906 San Francisco earthquake, Zoback studied the concept of the earthquake cycle.

== Personal life ==
Zoback married geophysicist Mark David Zoback in 1973. They have two children.

== Awards and honors ==
- 1987 – James B. Macelwane Medal of the American Geophysical Union
- 1995 – Elected to the United States National Academy of Sciences
- 2002 – Meritorious Service Award of the Department of the Interior
- 2003 – Bownocker Medal of Ohio State University
- 2006 – "Leadership, Innovation, and Outstanding Accomplishments in Earthquake Risk Reduction" Award from the Earthquake Engineering Research Institute
- 2007 – Arthur L. Day Medal of the Geological Society of America
- 2007 – Public Service Award of the Geological Society of America
- 2022 – Distinguished Alumni Award, Stanford University

== Selected publications ==
- State of stress in the conterminous United States. Journal of Geophysical Research, v. 85, no. B11, p. 6113–6156. (1980)
- Zoback, M. L., Anderson, R. E., and Thompson, G. A., Cenozoic evolution of the state of stress and style of Tectonism of the Basin and Range Province of the western United States: Phil. Trans. Roy. Soc. London A, v. 300, p. 407-434. (1981)
- Zoback, M. D., and Zoback, M. L., State of stress and intra-plate earthquakes in the central and eastern United States: Science, v. 213, p. 96-104. (1981)
- New evidence on the state of stress on the San Andreas fault system: Science, v. 238, p. 1105-1111. (1987)
- Zoback, M. L., and Zoback, M. D., Regional tectonic stress field of the continental U.S.: Geophysical Framework of the Continental U.S., L. Pakiser and W. D. Mooney, eds., Geological Society of America Memoir, 172, p. 523-539. (1989)
- Global patterns of tectonic stress. Nature, v. 341, p. 291–298. (1989)
- Zoback, M. L., Stress field constraints on intraplate seismicity in Eastern North America: Journal Geophysical Research, v. 97, p. 11761-11782. (1992)
- First and second order patterns of stress in the lithosphere: the World Stress Map project. Journal Geophysical Research, v. 97, p. 11703-11728. (1992)
- Abrupt along-strike change in tectonic style: San Andreas fault zone, San Francisco Peninsula. Journal of Geophysical Research: v. 104, p. 10719-10,742. (1999)
- Committee on Development of an Addendum to the National Science Education Standards on Scientific Inquiry, Inquiry and the National Science Education Standards, National Academy Press, 202 p. (2000)
- Analysis of the tsunamis generated by the Mw7.8 1906 San Francisco earthquake. Geology, v. 27, p. 15–18. (2000)
- Grand challenges in earth and environmental sciences: science, stewardship, and service for the 21st century. GSA Today, v., p. 41- 46. (2001)
