= Abbotsford–Sumas Aquifer =

Aquifer in British Columbia and Washington state

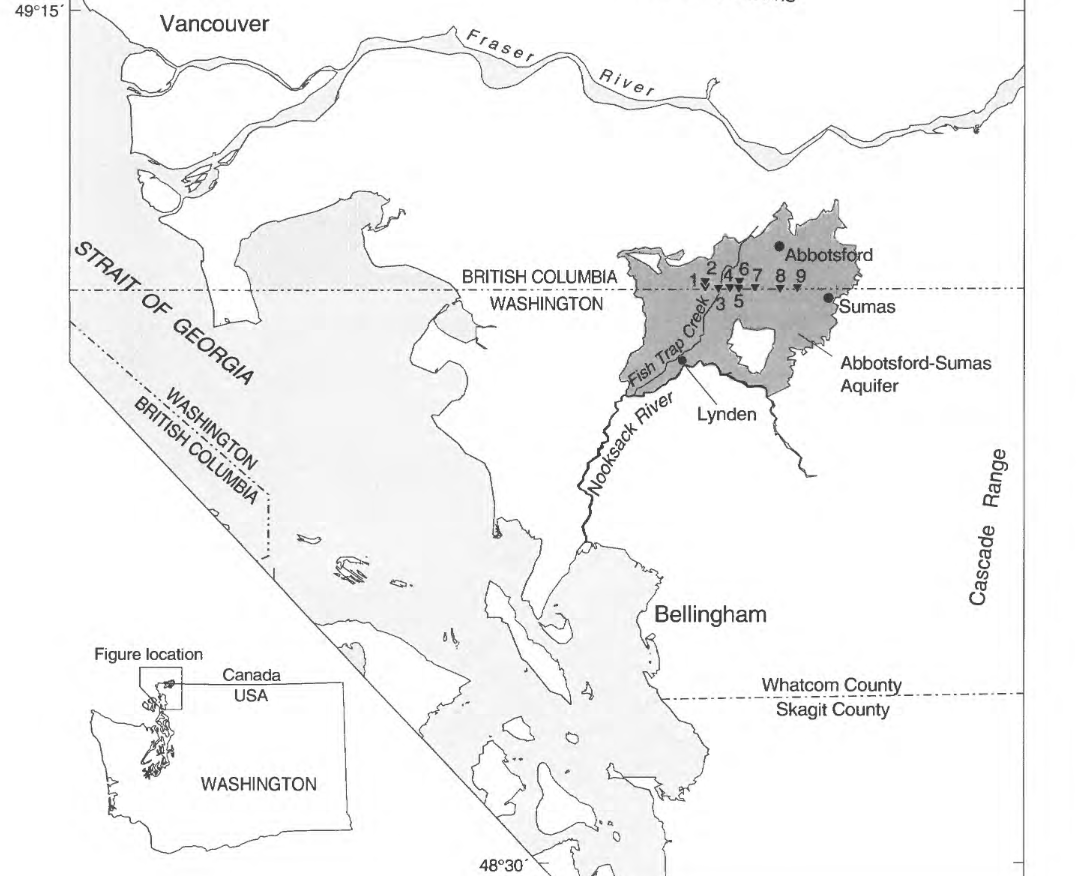
1999 map of the aquifer by the United States Geological Survey

The Abbotsford–Sumas Aquifer (also known as the Abbotsford Aquifer) is a shallow and largely unconfined aquifer lying between the U.S. state of Washington (a portion known as the Sumas–Blaine Aquifer) and the Canadian province of British Columbia. The aquifer underlies largely agricultural areas of the Fraser Valley and northern Whatcom County, Washington, including the communities of Lynden, Everson, Nooksack, and Sumas, as well as urban portions of Abbotsford, British Columbia. It contributes significantly to the overlying Sumas River (a tributary of the Fraser) and Nooksack River. The aquifer is a major source of water for the overlying communities, which includes one of the most agriculturally productive regions of Canada. However, surveys since the 1990s have indicated unsafe nitrate levels at some wells in the region contributed to by agricultural runoff from fertilizer and manure.

The aquifer consists of glaciofluval sand and gravel, alongside smaller amounts of glacial till and clayey silt. It is up to 70 m (230 ft) thick in its deepest portions, although generally ranges between 15 and 25 m (50 and 80 ft). The water table is deeper in the center of the aquifer, at most 30 m (98 ft) from the surface, but this can be as little as 2 m (6.6 ft) in the outlying portions. Due to seasonal fluctuations, the level of the water table varies by 2 or 3 m (7 or 10 ft) per year. Precipitation, the primary source of groundwater recharge, is high from October to March, but low for much of the growing season.

== Description ==
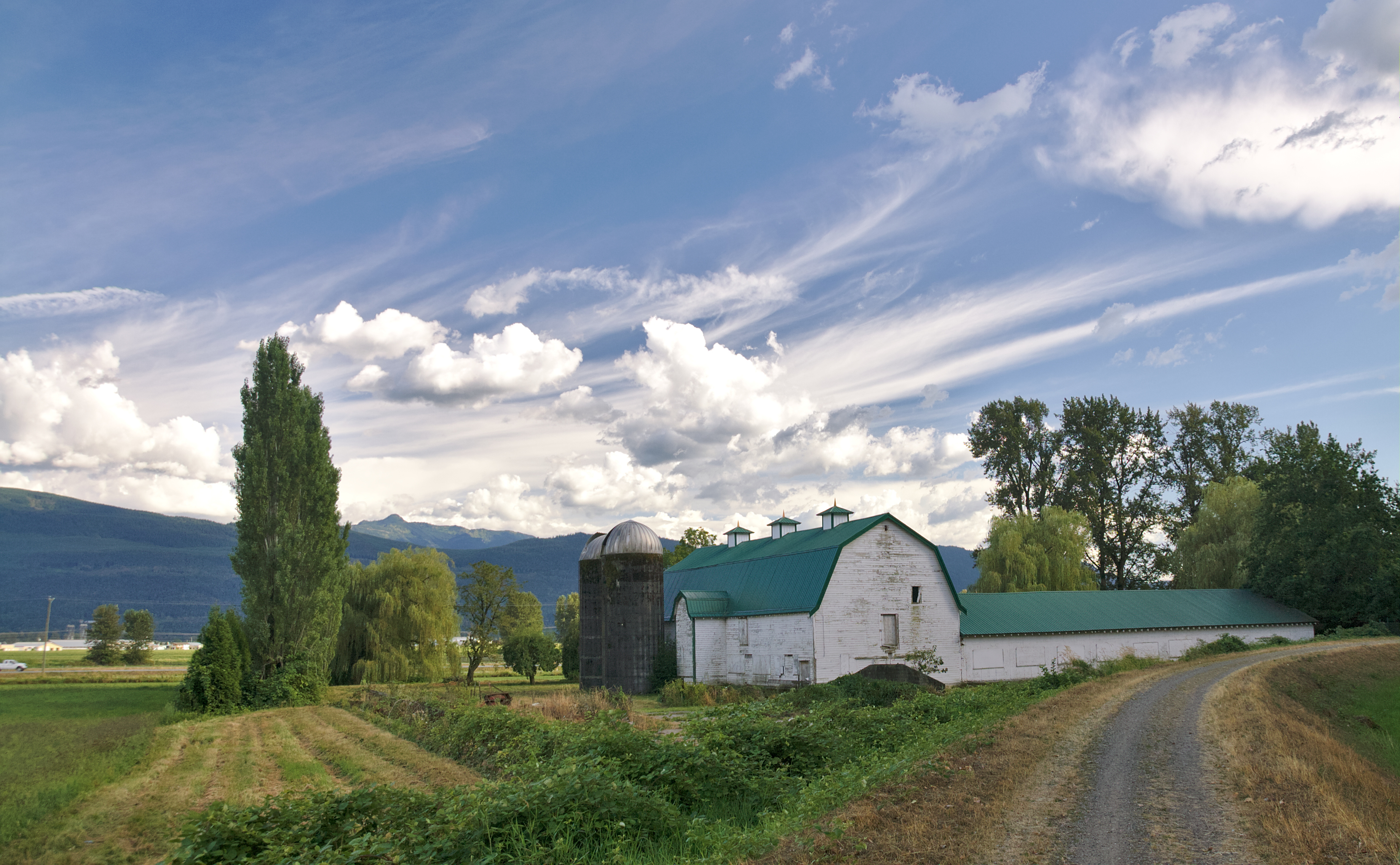
Farm in the Sumas River valley near Abbotsford

The Abbotsford–Sumas Aquifer (also known as the Abbotsford Aquifer) is a shallow and largely unconfined aquifer covering an area of roughly 100 sq mi (260 km^{2}) in southern British Columbia, Canada, and northern Whatcom County, Washington, U.S. (Note: The Washington State Department of Ecology gives an area of around 150 sq mi (390 km^{2}) for just the American portion of the aquifer, while the Abbotsford-Sumas Aquifer International Task Force gives an area of roughly 100 sq mi (260 km^{2}) for the whole aquifer, while a joint American-Canadian report published in 1999 places it at only 62 sq mi (160 km^{2}).)

The Canadian portion underlies urban portions of Abbotsford, British Columbia, and an expanse of farmland to the south and southwest of the city. Portions of the aquifer are within the Fraser Valley, one of the most agriculturally productive regions in Canada. Around 40% of the aquifer's overlying territory is used for agriculture. Raspberry, blueberry, and poultry farming are prominent local agricultural products. The Sumas–Blaine Aquifer, the American portion of the aquifer, is within northern Whatcom County, Washington. The overlying land here consists largely of rural farmland, mostly used for dairy and berry production; northern Whatcom County is the largest producer of raspberries in the United States. The overlying area includes the small cities of Lynden, Everson, Nooksack, and Sumas.

The valleys of the Sumas River and the Nooksack River partially overly the aquifer. Although the aquifer comprises a significant portion of the Sumas river baseflow, the majority of surface and groundwater in the region flows into the Nooksack, which flows south of the aquifer through a floodplain until it discharges into Bellingham Bay. The Sumas flows northeast from the aquifer until it meets the Fraser River. Creeks in small portions of the area drain north into the Fraser River or west towards Birch Bay, Washington. A number of small lakes occupy kettles and meltwater channels in the region, including Mill Lake, Judson Lake, and Laxton Lake. The large Sumas Lake occupied portions of the Sumas Valley until it was drained in 1924.

The Abbotsford–Sumas Aquifer is highly productive. It supplies water to residents of Abbotsford and the adjacent township of Langley, as well as to the smaller agricultural communities of northern Whatcom County. In addition to farms and homes, a significant portion of pumped groundwater is used to supply fish hatcheries in Abbotsford.

=== Geology and hydrogeology ===
The Fraser-Whatcom lowlands consist of floodplains interrupted by small hills of glacial drift and bedrock outcroppings. During the Pleistocene, glaciers repeatedly advanced and retreated through the Fraser lowlands. The Fraser glaciation (20,000–10,000 years ago) smoothed out the bedrock of the region and deposited unconsolidated material across the lowlands. The glacier retreated during the Sumas stage (11,000–10,000 years ago) and deposited outwashes of sand and gravel across the region. Glacial deposits have been interrupted by both erosion from the Nooksack River and the formation of peat bogs in depressions, creating layers of peat up to 10 m (30 ft) thick. The area is covered in thin and permeable soils, ranging from 0–70 cm (0–28 in) in thickness.

The aquifer is composed primarily of glaciofluval sand and gravel, alongside smaller amounts of glacial till and clayey silt. It is up to 70 m (230 ft) thick in some portions, although the precise vertical extent is not fully known. The average thickness is 15 to 25 m (50 to 80 ft), although most of the portion south of the Canadian–American border is less than 15 m (50 ft), and the aquifer reaches a minimum of around 5 m (20 ft) in some regions. In the central portions of the aquifer, the water table lies at most 30 m (98 ft) from the surface, although this can be as little as 2 m (6.6 ft) in the outlying portions. Underlying the aquifer is the Everson-Vashon semiconfining unit, consisting of clay and pebbly silt. This deposit is of glaciomarine origin and likely formed 13,500–11,000 years ago.

Due to seasonal fluctuations, the level of the water table varies by 2 or 3 m (7 or 10 ft) per year. Precipitation in the region is quite high: from 1971 to 2000, the average was 1,573 mm (61.9 in) per year, including 640 mm (25 in) of snow. As around 70% of this precipitation occurs in October to March, outside of the regular growing season, crops are generally irrigated in the summer. This results in highly variable groundwater recharge rates depending on the season, averaging out to 850 to 1,100 mm (33 to 43 in) over the course of the year. Precipitation is the source of the vast majority of the aquifer's recharge.

=== Water quality ===
Surveys in the late 1990s by the United States Geological Survey found unsafe levels of nitrate in around 15% of wells. Iron and manganese levels were also excessively high. Potential sources of nitrate in the aquifer include fertilizer, manure, sewage sludge, and naturally occurring nitrogen in soils and peat. The intensive agriculture of the region produces a considerable quantity of nitrate sources. Within the American portion of the overlying area, the raspberry crops are generally fertilized with artificial fertilizers, while corn and grasses (grown for feed) are sprayed with liquid manure from manure lagoons. The Canadian portion chiefly uses poultry manure for fertilization.

The Abbotsford-Sumas Aquifer International Task Force was established in 1992 by the governments of British Columbia and Washington to coordinate groundwater protection efforts in the region. Nitrate levels generally trended down from 2003 to 2016, although many sampled wells have maintained a similar level of nitrate during this period.

== Notes ==
=== Sources ===
- Allen, Diana M.; Schuurman, Nadine; Deshpande, Aparna; Scibek, Jacek (2008). "Data Integration and Standardization in Cross-Border Hydrogeological Studies: A Novel Approach to Hydrostratigraphic Model Development". Environmental Geology. 53 (7): 1441–1453. doi:10.1007/s00254-007-0753-3.
- Carey, Barbara M. (2017). Sumas-Blaine Aquifer Long-Term Groundwater Quality Monitoring, 2009-2016 (PDF) (Report). Washington State Department of Ecology.
- Carey, Barbara M.; Cummings, Ron (2012). Sumas-Blaine Aquifer Nitrate Contamination Summary (PDF) (Report). Washington State Department of Ecology.
- Cox, Stephen E.; Liebscher, Hugh (1999). Ground-Water Quality Data from the Abbotsford–Sumas Aquifer of Southwestern British Columbia and Northwestern Washington State, February 1997 (PDF) (Report). United States Geological Survey.
- Cox, Stephen E.; Kahle, Sue C. (1999). Hydrogeology, ground-water quality, and sources of nitrate in lowland glacial aquifers of Whatcom County, Washington, and British Columbia, Canada (Report). United States Geological Survey. doi:10.3133/wri984195.
- Mitchell, Robert J.; Babcock, R. Scott; Gelinas, Sharon; Nanus, Leora; Stasney, David E. (2003). "Nitrate Distributions and Source Identification in the Abbotsford–Sumas Aquifer, Northwestern Washington State". Journal of Environmental Quality. 32 (3): 789–800. doi:10.2134/jeq2003.7890. PMID 12809280.
- Norman, Emma S.; Melious, Jean O. (2004). "Transboundary Environmental Management: A Study of the Abbotsford-Sumas Aquifer in British Columbia and Western Washington". Journal of Borderlands Studies. 19 (2): 101–119. doi:10.1080/08865655.2004.9695628.
- Scibek, Jacek; Allen, Diana (2005). Numerical Groundwater Flow Model of the Abbotsford-Sumas Aquifer, Central Fraser Lowland of BC, Canada, and Washington State, US (PDF) (Report). Simon Fraser University.
- Scibek, Jacek; Allen, Diana (2006). Groundwater Sensitivity to Climate Change: Abbotsford-Sumas Aquifer in British Columbia, Canada and Washington State, US (PDF) (Report). Simon Fraser University.
- Zebarth, Bernie J.; Ryan, M. Carthryn; Graham, Gwyn; Forge, Thomas A.; Neilsen, Denise (2015). "Groundwater Monitoring to Support Development of BMPs for Groundwater Protection: The Abbotsford-Sumas Aquifer Case Study". Groundwater Monitoring & Remediation. 35 (1): 82–96. doi:10.1111/gwmr.12092.
