= Bryan Isacks =

American geophysicist (1936–2026)

Bryan L. Isacks
- Born: Bryan Leonard Isacks; July 25, 1936; New Orleans, Louisiana, U.S.
- Died: September 9, 2026 (aged 90); Ithaca, New York, U.S.
- Education: Columbia University (A.B. 1958; PhD 1965)
- Awards: Fellow, American Geophysical Union (1976); Fellow, American Association for the Advancement of Science (2001); Walter H. Bucher Medal (2014)
- Scientific career
- Fields: Geophysics, seismology, plate tectonics
- Workplaces: Columbia University; Cornell University
- Doctoral advisor: Jack Oliver

Bryan Leonard Isacks (July 25, 1936 – September 9, 2026) was an American geophysicist who played an important role in providing seismological evidence for the theory of plate tectonics in the late 1960s. He was a professor of geological sciences at Cornell University from 1971 until his retirement in 2008. In 2014, Isacks was awarded the Walter H. Bucher Medal of the American Geophysical Union in recognition of his contributions to geophysics, and the understanding of the geological process of subduction.

== Life and career ==
Isacks was born in New Orleans on July 25, 1936, to Leonard Smith Isacks and Sue Bryan Isacks. His father died in World War II when Isacks was eight years old.

In 1954, Isacks went to Columbia University, with a scholarship and attracted by the campus location in New York City. He graduated in 1958 with a B.A. degree in physics and geology. During the summer of 1957, Jack Oliver, who was a geophysicist at Columbia University's Lamont Geological Observatory, hired Isacks to help run the Arctic field station Ice Station Alpha, on a drifting iceberg known as Fletcher's Ice Island, or T3. Isacks spent a second summer and fall season there in 1958, before starting graduate study at Lamont in January 1959. Isacks completed his PhD on high-frequency shear waves under Oliver's supervision in 1964, and was awarded the degree in 1965.

After his PhD, Isacks continued working with Oliver, this time searching for the signs of deep earthquakes in networks of newly installed seismometers. He relocated to Suva, Fiji in September 1964, was joined later by his family, and remained in Fiji until late 1965, collecting seismic data from earthquakes that had originated deep below South America. These data led Isacks, Oliver and Lynn Sykes, another researcher at Lamont, to recognise that these deep earthquakes traced the location of a slab of tectonic plate which was sinking deep into Earth's mantle.

In 1968, Isacks published a landmark paper jointly with Oliver and Sykes, in which they argued that a "comprehensive study of the observations of seismology provides widely based strong support for the new global tectonics". This is now regarded as a formative paper in the acceptance of the theory of plate tectonics. A footnote to the paper indicates that the three authors drew lots to decide the order of the author list.

He joined the faculty of Cornell University in 1971, and was director of the institute for the study of the continents. Here Isacks developed an explanatory theory for the uplift and tectonics of the Altiplano of the Central Andes in South America. He was chair of the geological sciences department from 1994 to 2003, and was the William and Katherine Snee Professor of Geological Sciences.

Isacks died on September 9, 2026, at the age of 90.

== Recognition and legacy ==
In 1998, Isacks recorded an oral history interview for the American Institute of Physics Niels Bohr Library and archives digital collections. This interview documents his recollections of his time at Lamont in the late 1960s, and the developments in seismology and plate tectonics during this time.

Isacks was elected a Fellow of the American Geophysical Union in 1976, and a Fellow of the American Association for the Advancement of Science in 2001.

In 2006, Cornell's department of earth and atmospheric sciences hosted a symposium over three days to celebrate Isacks contributions to geoscience, to mark his 70th birthday and the start of his retirement.

In 2014, Isacks was awarded the Walter Bucher medal of the American Geophysical Union, for his contributions to the study of the subduction of the oceanic plates.
