= Christopher Hawkesworth =

British scientist (born 1947)

- Born: 18 December 1947; Khartoum
- Education: Trinity College Dublin, St Edmund Hall
- Awards: Fellow of the Royal Society (2002); Wollaston Medal (2012); Fellowship of the Royal Society of Edinburgh (2012); Robert Wilhelm Bunsen Medal (2014); Walter H. Bucher Medal (2023); V. M. Goldschmidt Award (2025)

Christopher John Hawkesworth FRS FRSE (born 18 December 1947) is a British earth scientist, and former Deputy Principal and Vice-Principal for Research, at University of St Andrews.

== Biography ==
Hawkesworth was born in Khartoum, Sudan on 18 December 1947, and was brought up in Ireland. He graduated with from Trinity College, Dublin in 1970, and then moved to Oxford University where he studied for a DPhil in geology at St Edmund Hall from 1970 to 1974, under the supervision of Professor Ron Oxburgh. While at Oxford, Hawkesworth played rugby for the University, and was awarded Blues in 1970, 1971 and 1972 after playing in the annual Oxford - Cambridge rugby union varsity matches.

He held positions at Open University and University of Bristol prior to holding the Wardlaw Chair of Earth Sciences and the position of Deputy Principal and Vice-Principal of Research at the University of St Andrews until 2014.

He was awarded the Wollaston Medal in 2012. In 2012, he was elected a Fellow of the Royal Society of Edinburgh. In 2020, he was made a member of the Royal Irish Academy.
