= Thomas H. Pigford =

American academic (1922–2010)

- Thomas H. Pigford
- Born: April 21, 1922; Meridian, Mississippi, U.S.
- Died: February 27, 2010 (aged 87); Oakland, California, U.S.
- Occupation: Professor at the University of California, Berkeley
- Known for: Influential voice in nuclear policy
- Notable work: Nuclear Chemical Engineering (book)
- Spouse(s): Catherine Kennedy Cathey (?–1992); Elizabeth Hood Weekes (1994–2010)
- Children: 2

Thomas H. Pigford (April 21, 1922 – February 27, 2010) was a professor and the founding chairman of the Department of Nuclear Engineering at the University of California, Berkeley. The scope of his career in nuclear engineering consisted of reactor design, nuclear safety, fuel cycles, and radioactive waste management. He is credited for having an influential voice in nuclear policy. Pigford was generally well respected by scientists and environmentalists alike because of the expertise he brought to the subject and his objectivity. He was considered a pro-nuclear advocate, but only if done so in a safe way.

== Early years ==
Pigford graduated magna cum laude from Georgia Institute of Technology in 1943. He served in the Navy during World War II, and was later asked to join the faculty of the Massachusetts Institute of Technology while still completing his doctorate. Pigford helped to establish the Nuclear Engineering Department at MIT.

== Marriage and family ==
Pigford married his first wife Catherine Kennedy Cathey and had two daughters, Cynthia and Julie Pigford. Catherine died in 1992. Two years after the death of his first wife, Pigford married his second wife Elizabeth Hood Weekes in 1994. He had two stepdaughters from his second marriage, Janvrin Deler and Laura Weekes.

== Career ==
As a chemical engineer, he co-authored the book "Nuclear Chemical Engineering" published in 1958 and 1983 which outlined methods that the government used for harvesting plutonium from reactor fuel to be used in bombs. This text was critical because it was considered to be the first in the field. He won the John Wesley Powell Award for his contribution to the United States Geological Survey.

=== Three Mile Island accident ===
Pigford was appointed to a commission in 1979 to study the Three Mile Island accident in Harrisburg, Pennsylvania. The commission reported that certain operators lacked proper training which led them to turning off certain safety systems. With these safety systems off, a simple malfunction turned into a larger problem that destroyed the nuclear core. Pigford was very critical of the Nuclear Regulatory Commission for their technical errors and the alarmist response. "Every technology imposes a finite degree of risk upon society, both in its routine operation and in the occurrence of accidents. The essential question is the trade-off between the risks and the benefits. The commission neither received any evidence nor reached any conclusions that the risks of nuclear power outweigh its benefits."

=== Chernobyl disaster ===
Seven years after the Three Mile Island incident, a nuclear reactor in Chernobyl, Ukraine exploded and spewed a cloud of radioactive material across Europe. Pigford was appointed by the secretary of energy to a committee for evaluating the safety implementations of a similar reactor in Hanford, Washington. Pigford concluded that the plant, which was being used to make plutonium for nuclear bombs, was less safe than the American commercial nuclear reactors. He rejected safety measures proposed by the department, claiming that they would be no help at all. Immediately after this revelation, the department closed the reactor.

=== Proposed Yucca Mountain nuclear waste repository ===
Pigford served on the EPA panel in the mid-1990s to help advise the agency on what standards should be put in place for the proposed Yucca Mountain nuclear waste repository in Nevada. The EPA eventually decided that the government should have the power to assume how to use the land in the area in future millenniums. Pigford was critical of the EPA for permitting higher levels of radiation contamination in the water supply for farmers because of their assumption that the land would only be used by subsistence farmers, "They end up with such a less stringent result that cannot be defended. That’s bad for the project; it’s bad for the country."

== Death ==
In 2001, Pigford was diagnosed with Parkinson's disease and was treated for nine years. He died from complications of the disease on February 27, 2010, at his home in Oakland, California.

== See also ==
- Nuclear engineering
- Nuclear reactor
- Nuclear fuel cycle
- Radioactive waste
- John Wesley Powell Award
