= Lincoln Southeast High School =

Public school in Lincoln, Nebraska

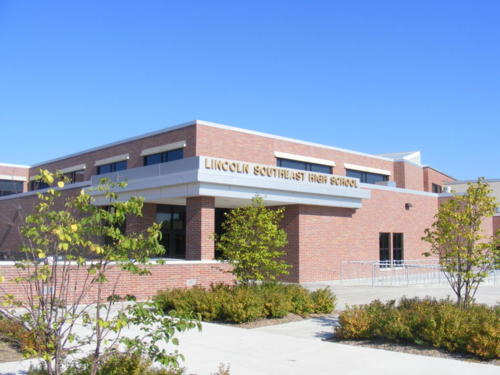

Location
- 2930 South 37th Street; Lincoln, Nebraska 68506; United States; 40°46′58″N 96°40′1″W

Information
- Type: Public
- Established: 1955
- School district: Lincoln Public Schools
- Principal: Tanner Penrod
- Teaching staff: 107.26 (FTE)
- Grades: 9–12
- Enrollment: 1,848 (2024-2025)
- Student to teacher ratio: 17.23
- Colors: Black and gold
- Nickname: Knights
- Website: lse.lps.org

Lincoln Southeast High School is a public high school located in Lincoln, Nebraska, United States. It is part of the Lincoln Public Schools district.

Lincoln Southeast High School has the highest accreditation from the Nebraska Department of Education. It is a member of, and is accredited by, the North Central Association of Colleges and Secondary Schools. In 1986, Southeast High School was recognized in the U.S. Department of Education's Secondary School Recognition Program as a "School of Excellence". The school colors are black, gold, and white, and its athletic teams are the Knights. Advanced Placement courses are offered for freshmen, sophomores, juniors, and seniors.

== Renovations ==
As part of a recent $250 million school improvement bond issue, renovations were planned for Southeast and are now finished. Renovations included the expansion of the cafeteria, the replacement of the roofing and windows, renovation of the performing arts wing, new classroom additions, new heating and air conditioning systems, and various exterior fixes. The renovations were started in June 2006 and were expected to be finished in mid-2008, but delays moved it back to early 2009.

== Extracurricular activities ==
=== Athletics ===
From 1971 until 2013, Southeast was nominated for twenty All Sport Championships. From its beginning in 1955, Southeast has won 114 state championships for team sports in various athletic fields.

State championships
| Season | Sport/activity | Number of championships | Year |
|---|---|---|---|
| Fall | Football | 9 | 1976, 1977, 1991, 1992, 1997, 1998, 2000, 2002, 2011 |
| Fall | Cross country, boys' | 10 | 1984, 1985, 1986, 1988, 1991, 1992, 1994, 1997, 1998, 1999 |
| Fall | Cross country, girls' | 13 | 1983, 1984, 1989, 1990, 1991, 1992, 1993, 1994, 1995, 1996, 1997, 2000, 2001 |
| Fall | Golf, girls' | 10 | 1976, 1977, 1979, 1980, 1981, 1983, 1984, 1987, 1988, 1991, 1993, 1999, 2000 |
| Fall | Softball | 1 | 1994 |
| Fall | Tennis, boys' | 11 | 1972, 1974, 1975, 1979, 1980, 1982, 1987, 1997, 1999, 2000, 2011 |
| Winter | Wrestling | 5 | 1971, 1990, 1991, 1992, 1993 |
| Winter | Basketball, girls' | 10 | 1986, 1988, 1990, 1993, 1994, 1995, 1997, 2003, 2008, 2013 |
| Winter | Swimming and diving, boys' | 13 | 1959, 1960, 1961, 1962, 1963, 1964, 1965, 1966, 1977, 1987, 1989, 1990, 1993 |
| Winter | Swimming and diving, girls' | 3 | 1982, 1983, 1999 |
| Spring | Golf, boys' | 14 | 1962, 1977, 1978, 1979, 1980, 1983, 1985, 1986, 1987, 1988, 1990, 1993, 1998, 2009 |
| Spring | Track and field, boys' | 2 | 1988, 1992 |
| Spring | Track and field, girls' | 5 | 1985, 2000, 2001, 2002, 2003 |
| Spring | Baseball | 5 | 1958, 1960, 1961, 1962, 1977 |
| Spring | Soccer, boys' | 1 | 2001 |
| Spring | Tennis, girls' | 4 | 1983, 2000, 2016, 2019 |
| Total | | 114 | |

=== Non-athletic programs ===
Southeast offers many other non-athletic programs, such as drama, speech, and debate. Southeast's dance team, the Shirettes, have won national competitions since their inception in the 1980s, including in 2015. Southeast's cheerleading competition team won the state title in 2010 and 2016.

==== Music ====
Southeast also has a music program that includes three symphonic bands, marching band, three jazz bands and eight choirs that compete in numerous state festivals.

The Nebraska Cornhusker Marching Band was unable to attend the Holiday Bowl, and the Lincoln Southeast Marching Knights were asked to fill in at the bowl game. They played for the Nebraska Cornhuskers football team as they took the field on December 30, 2009 and performed during the game.

The Lincoln Southeast Marching Knights will be performing at the halftime show of the 2019 Valero Alamo Bowl in a mass band.

== Notable alumni ==
- Jessica Shepard, current WNBA player for the Dallas Wings
- Mirsad Bektić, mixed martial artist fighting in the Ultimate Fighting Championship
- Jon Bruning, 31st Attorney General of Nebraska
- Bob Green, American college football coach
- Derek Chollet, foreign policy advisor
- Trent Claus, visual effects artist
- Chris Cooper, former NFL player
- Ana Marie Cox, founding editor of Wonkette
- David DeVries, Home at Last-The authors novel was told as part of the Public Television series Wonderworks. The script was filmed in 1987 at the Stuhr Museum of the Prairie Pioneer in Grand Island. Film writer, Director, Author from Nebraska
- Deb Fischer, senior United States senator from Nebraska
- Larry Gerard, former United States men's national artistic gymnastics team member
- Luke Gifford, NFL player
- Alex Gordon, outfielder for the Kansas City Royals
- Charles C. Hagemeister, Medal of Honor recipient
- Jon Hesse, former NFL player
- Nolan Hoffman, baseball player
- Matt Hill, basketball coach
- Joshua James, folk singer
- Paige Nielsen, professional soccer player
- Dirk Obbink, papyrologist, classicist
- Patty Pansing Brooks, politician
- Nathan Phillips, a Native American political activist
- Emily Poeschl, Miss Nebraska USA 2006
- Andrea Portes, bestselling novelist
- Barrett Ruud, former NFL linebacker for the Tampa Bay Buccaneers
- Bo Ruud, former NFL player
- Susan Seacrest, environmental activist and teacher
- Erik Sommer, artist
- Ryland Steen, drummer for Reel Big Fish
- Carel Stith, former NFL player
- Matthew Sweet, musician, songwriter, and singer
- James Valentine, guitarist for Maroon 5
