= Samuel S. Adams =

American economic geologist (1937-2006)

Samuel Sherman Adams (January 26, 1937 – May 5, 2006) was an economic geologist who was a leading advocate of cooperation and multidisciplinary collaboration among professional geologists, the business community, the government, and public interests.

He began his career as a geologist for International Minerals and Chemical Corporation (subsequently renamed IMC Global and merged into The Mosaic Company) and the Anaconda Copper Mining Company. In 1986, he became a professor at the Colorado School of Mines and head of its Geology and Geological Engineering Department. In 1991, he returned to his native New Hampshire to become president and general manager of Loon Mountain, a major ski and summer resort in the state.

Apart from his occupational pursuits, he was a leading member of the broader geosciences community and contributed to it in many ways. He was president of the American Geological Institute (AGI), receiving its highest award, the Ian Campbell Medal, in 2005; in addition, he was editor-in-chief of Geotimes, the AGI's monthly news magazine. He also served as president of the Society of Economic Geologists. He was a member of the council of the Geological Society of America and received its Distinguished Service Award in 2002.

Adams served the government in a number of capacities. In 1996, Adams was named chairman of the United States National Research Council (NRC) panel that reviewed the Mineral Resource Surveys Program Plan of the United States Geological Survey (USGS). In recognition of his service to the USGS, he was presented with the John Wesley Powell Award, the USGS's highest honor, in 1998. He was subsequently vice chairman of the NRC Committee on Hardrock Mining on Federal Lands. For many years, he served as a member of the Board of Earth Sciences and Resources of the National Academy of Sciences, advising the United States Congress and government agencies on issues and policy related to earth science and environmental science.

Born in Lincoln, New Hampshire, as Samuel Sherman Adams, he was the son of Sherman Adams, who served as White House Chief of Staff for President Dwight D. Eisenhower and as Governor of New Hampshire, and Rachel White. He graduated from Cardigan Mountain School in 1951 and St. Paul's School in 1955. He received a B.S. in 1959 and an M.S. in 1961 from Dartmouth College. He earned a Ph.D. from Harvard University in 1968.
