= Walter H. Bucher Medal =

The Walter H. Bucher Medal is an annual award to one honoree from the American Geophysical Union (AGU) for "original contributions to the basic knowledge of the crust and lithosphere."

The inaugural Bucher Medal was awarded in 1968 to J. Tuzo Wilson. From 1975 to 1995 and from 1996 to 2018 the medal was awarded every two years. The medal was established in 1966 (the year after Walter H. Bucher's death).

The medal is named after Walter Hermann Bucher (1888–1965), president of the AGU from 1948 to 1953. Bucher's main fields of investigation were the Earth's tectonic processes and the resulting manifestations in the Earth's crust.

== Medallists ==
- 1968 – John Tuzo Wilson
- 1969 – James Gilluly
- 1970 – David T. Griggs
- 1971 – Robert S. Dietz
- 1972 – W. Jason Morgan
- 1974 – Maurice Ewing
- 1975 – Lynn Sykes
- 1977 – Bruce C. Heezen
- 1979 – Edward Irving
- 1981 – Jack E. Oliver
- 1983 – John W. Handin
- 1985 – John G. Sclater
- 1987 – William Francis Brace
- 1989 – Arthur H. Lachenbruch
- 1991 – Seiya Uyeda
- 1993 – Aleksey N. Khramov
- 1995 – Patrick Hurley
- 1996 – Hiroo Kanamori
- 1998 – Norman H. Sleep
- 2000 – James H. Dieterich
- 2002 – Stuart Ross Taylor
- 2004 – Mervyn S. Paterson
- 2006 – E. Bruce Watson
- 2008 – Mark Zoback
- 2010 – Paul F. Hoffman
- 2012 – James Rice
- 2014 – Bryan Isacks
- 2016 – Samuel Bowring
- 2018 – Philip England
- 2019 – Leigh Royden
- 2020 – Susan L. Beck
- 2021 – Mark Harrison
- 2022 – Seth Stein
- 2023 – Chris Hawkesworth
- 2024 – Frank S. Spear
- 2025 - Richard G. Gordon
