= Susan L. Beck =

Geophysicist

Susan L. Beck is a geophysicist and professor of geosciences at the University of Arizona specializing in seismology and tectonics of the American Cordillera.

Beck earned first a B.S. in geology in 1979 and then an M.S. in structural geology in 1982 from the University of Utah before obtaining her Ph.D. in seismology from the University of Michigan in 1987. She did postdoctoral research at Lawrence Livermore National Laboratory before joining the faculty in the Department of Geosciences at the University of Arizona. She became a full professor in 2001 and served as head of the department from 2000 to 2007. Beck is a fellow of the American Geophysical Union and of the Geological Society of America both for her contributions to seismology and to research in understanding mountain building in the Andes and the North and South American Cordillera. In 2008, Beck was elected to a three-year term as chair of the Incorporated Research Institutions for Seismology an international consortium of universities for research in seismology. In 2020, she was awarded the Walter H. Bucher Medal for her contributions to fundamental understandings of the crust and lithosphere.
