= Mark Zoback =

American geophysicist

- Born: Brooklyn, New York, U.S.
- Education: Stanford University; University of Arizona
- Awards: Walter H. Bucher Medal (2008); Louis Néel Medal (2013)
- Scientific career
- Fields: Geophysics
- Workplaces: Stanford University

Mark D. Zoback is an American geophysicist and emeritus faculty at Stanford University. Zoback is the author of numerous technical publications and the textbook Reservoir Geomechanics. first published in 2007 and the textbook Unconventional Reservoir Geomechanics (with Arjun Kohli) published in 2019.

== Career ==
Zoback is the Benjamin M. Page Professor of Geophysics, Emeritus at Stanford University, where he was also the Director of the Stanford Natural Gas Initiative and Co-Director of the Stanford Center for Induced and Triggered Seismicity and the Stanford Center for Carbon Storage and a Senior Fellow in the Precourt Institute for Energy. Zoback conducts research on in situ stress, fault mechanics, and reservoir geomechanics with an emphasis on shale gas, tight gas and tight oil production as well as CO_{2} sequestration. Zoback served on the Secretary of Energy Subcommittee on shale gas development and the National Academy of Engineering Committee that investigated the Deepwater Horizon accident. He is the author of two textbooks and the author/co-author of approximately 400 technical papers. His most recent book, Unconventional Reservoir Geomechanics, was written with Arjun Kohli, and published in 2019 by Cambridge University Press. His online course, Reservoir Geomechanics, has been taken by over 30,000 people around the world. Zoback has received awards and honors including election to the U.S. National Academy of Engineering in 2011. He was awarded an Einstein Chair Professorship of the Chinese Academy of Sciences in 2013 and received the Robert R. Berg Outstanding Research Award of the AAPG in 2015. He was the 2020 chair of the Society of Petroleum Engineers Technical Committee on Carbon Capture, Utilization and Storage and 2021 Honorary Lecturer for the Society of Exploration Geophysicists. In 2023, he was selected as a Hagler Distinguished Lecturer at Texas A&M University. In 2024 he was awarded the Rolf Emmermann medal of the German Research Centre for Geosciences and the Maurice Ewing Medal, the highest honor of the Society of Exploration Geophysicists. In 2025 he was named the Alumni of the Year by the College of Science of the University of Arizona. He is currently Chief Scientist and Working Equity Partner for Azimuth Capital, and a senior advisor for ResFrac Corporation, GeoTomo and PetroAI.

== Personal life ==
He is married to the American geophysicist Mary Lou Zoback. They two children and four granddaughters. They live on the Stanford University campus.

== Selected publications ==
- John Townend; Mark D. Zoback (2000). "How faulting keeps the crust strong". Geology. 28 (5): 399–402. Bibcode:2000Geo....28..399T. doi:10.1130/0091-7613(2000)28<399:hfktcs>2.0.co;2. ISSN 0091-7613. Wikidata Q57850245.
- Mary Lou Zoback; Mark Zoback (10 November 1980). "State of stress in the conterminous United States". Journal of Geophysical Research. 85 (B11): 6113–6156. Bibcode:1980JGR....85.6113Z. doi:10.1029/jb085ib11p06113. ISSN 0148-0227. Wikidata Q97855966.
- Mary Lou Zoback; Mark D. Zoback; J. Adams; et al. (September 1989). "Global patterns of tectonic stress". Nature. 341 (6240): 291–298. Bibcode:1989Natur.341..291Z. doi:10.1038/341291a0. ISSN 1476-4687. Wikidata Q56610367.
