= W. Jason Morgan =

American geophysicist (1935–2023)

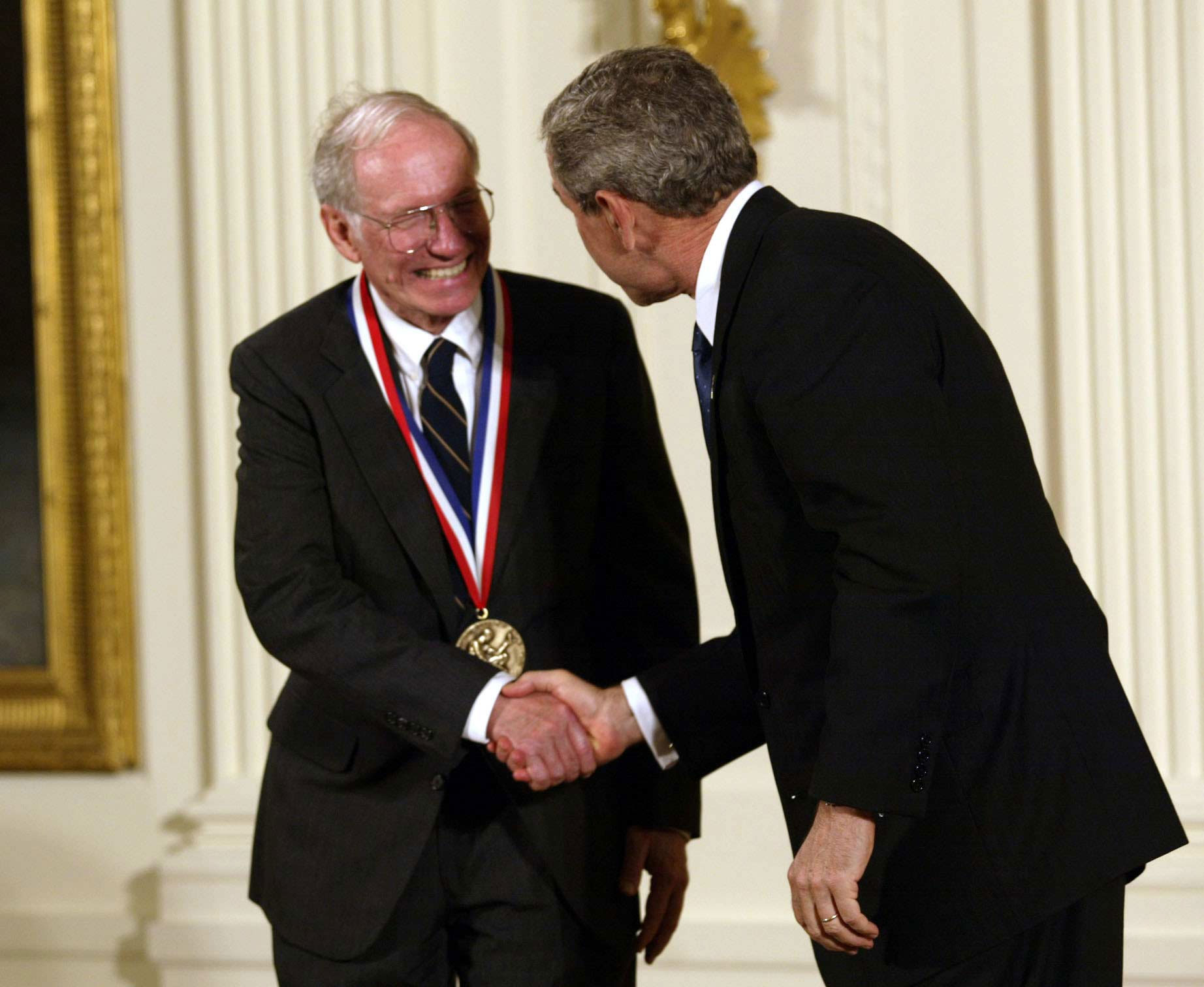
- Morgan receiving the National Medal of Science from George W. Bush in 2003
- Born: William Jason Morgan; October 10, 1935; Savannah, Georgia, U.S.
- Died: July 31, 2023 (aged 87); Natick, Massachusetts, U.S.
- Education: Georgia Institute of Technology; Princeton University
- Awards: Walter H. Bucher Medal (1972); Maurice Ewing Medal (1987); Japan Prize (1990); Wollaston Medal (1994); Vetlesen Prize (2000); National Medal of Science (2002)
- Scientific career
- Fields: Geophysicist
- Workplaces: Princeton University
- Doctoral advisor: Robert H. Dicke

William Jason Morgan (October 10, 1935 – July 31, 2023) was an American geophysicist who made seminal contributions to the theory of plate tectonics and geodynamics. He retired as the Knox Taylor Professor emeritus of geology and professor of geosciences at Princeton University. He served as a visiting scholar in the Department of Earth and Planetary Sciences at Harvard University until his death.

== Early life and education ==
Morgan was born on October 10, 1935, in Savannah, Georgia. His father William owned a hardware and dry goods store and his mother Maxie Ponita (Donehoo) Morgan was a French teacher and volunteered with the Girl Scouts of America.

He attended Georgia Institute of Technology, initially studying mechanical engineering, but switched to physics halfway through his studies. He graduated in 1957. He was in the Navy for two years working as an instructor at its Nuclear Power School, which directed him toward graduate studies. In 1959, he went to Princeton University, where he completed his PhD in 1964 under the supervision of Robert H. Dicke. He joined the faculty of the university immediately afterwards.

Morgan's Ph.D. thesis about fluctuations in the gravitational constant was unrelated to geology. As a post-doctoral fellow, he shared an office with the English geologist Fred Vine who had discovered the bilateral symmetry of seafloor spreading. After reading H.W. Menard's work he began to consider how great faults and fracture zones might relate to the geometry of spheres.

== Career ==
His first major contribution, made in the late 1960s, was to relate the magnetic anomalies of alternating polarity, which occur on the ocean bottom at both sides of a mid-ocean ridge, to seafloor spreading and plate tectonics.

From 1971 on he worked on the further development of the plume theory of Tuzo Wilson, which postulates the existence of roughly cylindrical convective upwellings in the Earth's mantle as an explanation of hotspots. Wilson originally applied the concept to Hawaii and explained the increase in age of the seamounts of the Hawaii-Emperor chain with increasing distance from the current hotspot location; however, the concept was subsequently applied to many other hotspots by Morgan and other scientists.

"The theory of plate tectonics he published in 1968 is one of the major milestones of U.S. science in the 20th century," F. A. Dahlen, chair of the Princeton Department of Geosciences, wrote in 2003. "Essentially all of the research in solid-earth geophysical sciences in the past 30 to 35 years has been firmly grounded upon Jason Morgan's plate tectonic theory," Dahlen said. "The scientific careers of a generation of geologists and geophysicists have been founded upon his landmark 1968 paper."

== Awards and honors ==
Morgan received many honors and awards for his work, among them the Bucher Medal (1972), the Alfred Wegener Medal of the European Geosciences Union (1983), the Maurice Ewing Medal of the American Geophysical Union (1987), the Japan Prize (1990), the Wollaston Medal of the Geological Society of London (1994) and the National Medal of Science of the US, award year 2002.

== Personal life ==
In 1959, Morgan married Cary Goldschmidt. Together they had two children. She died in 1991. He died in Natick, Massachusetts on July 31, 2023, at the age of 87.

== Selected publications ==
- Morgan, W. J. (1991) [1968]. "Rises, Trenches, Great Faults, and Crustal Blocks" (PDF). Tectonophysics. 187 (1–3): 6–22. Bibcode:1991Tectp.187....6M. doi:10.1016/0040-1951(91)90408-K. 1968 JGR publication, full text
- Morgan, W. J. (March 5, 1971). "Convection plumes in the lower mantle". Nature. 230 (5288): 42–43. Bibcode:1971Natur.230...42M. doi:10.1038/230042a0. S2CID 4145715.
- Morgan, W. J. (February 1972). "Plate motions and deep mantle convection" (PDF). The American Association of Petroleum Geologists Bulletin. 56 (2): 203–213. doi:10.1306/819A3E50-16C5-11D7-8645000102C1865D.
- Morgan, W. J. (1972). "Plate motions and deep mantle convection". In Shagam, R; Hargraves, RB; Morgan, WJ; et al. (eds.). Studies in earth and space sciences: A memoir in honor of Harry Hammond Hess. Geological Society of America Memoirs. Vol. 132. pp. 7–22. doi:10.1130/MEM132-p7. ISBN 0-8137-1132-0.
- Morgan, W. J. (1981). "Hotspot tracks and the opening of the Atlantic and Indian Oceans". In Cesare Emiliani (ed.). The Oceanic Lithosphere. New York: Wiley. pp. 443–489. ISBN 0-674-01736-6.
