= James H. Dieterich =

American geophysicist

- Born: 1942 (age 83–84); Seattle, Washington
- Education: B.S Geology, University of Washington: M.Phil Geology, Yale University; Ph.D Geophysics, Yale University (1968)
- Organization: National Academy of Sciences
- Title: Distinguished Professor of Geophysics, Emeritus Former chair, National Earthquake Prediction Evaluation Council
- Awards: Wilbur Cross Medal (2026): United States Geological Survey Distinguished Service Award (2007); American Geophysical Union Walter H. Bucher Medal (2000); Department of Interior Superior Service Award (1990)
- Website: earthsciences.ucr.edu/dieterich.html

James Herbert Dieterich (born 1942) is an American geophysics professor emeritus at University of California, Riverside (UCR).

== Early life and education ==
Born in Seattle, Washington, Dieterich studied geology at the University of Washington before going on to graduate work at Yale University. He earned his Ph.D. in 1968. His doctoral thesis discussed the "Sequence and mechanics of folding in the area of New Haven, Westport, and Naugatuck, Connecticut." He then went to work for the USGS.

== Career ==
Dieterich spent most of his career at USGS/Menlo Park. In October 1983 Dieterich made a trip to Costa Rica to evaluate recent University of California, Santa Cruz earthquake prediction models. His research, published in both his 1994 paper A constitutive law for rate of earthquake production and its application to earthquake clustering and his 1996 paper with Brian D. Kilgore entitled Implications of fault constitutive properties for earthquake prediction, theorized that the magnitude of a given earthquake and the rate of follow-on aftershocks occurred in inverse proportion, meaning that stronger earthquakes have fewer aftershocks. A study published in 2002 by Shinji Toda et al., addressing an earthquake swarm at the Izu Islands in 2000, confirms Dieterich's hypothesis. In 2003 he was elected to the National Academy of Sciences. In 2011, Dieterich's Department of Earth Sciences at UCR was awarded a five-year, US$4,600,000 (equivalent to $6,583,580 in 2025) grant by the National Science Foundation to study earthquake fault system dynamics. Dieterich was named the principal investigator for the grant. The study design included the use of computer simulations to better model seismic activity at the San Andreas Fault.

== Publications ==
- Dieterich, James H. (May 10, 1979). "Modeling of rock friction: 1. Experimental results and constitutive equations". Journal of Geophysical Research: Solid Earth. 84 (B5): 2161–2168. Bibcode:1979JGR....84.2161D. doi:10.1029/JB084iB05p02161.
- Dieterich, James H. (1992). "Earthquake nucleation on faults with rate-and state-dependent strength". Tectonophysics. 211 (1–4): 115–134. Bibcode:1992Tectp.211..115D. doi:10.1016/0040-1951(92)90055-b.
- Dieterich, James (February 10, 1994). "A constitutive law for rate of earthquake production and its application to earthquake clustering" (PDF). Journal of Geophysical Research. 99 (B2): 2601–2618. Bibcode:1994JGR....99.2601D. doi:10.1029/93jb02581. Archived from the original (PDF) on 2016-03-20.
- —; B Kilgore (April 30, 1996). "Implications of fault constitutive properties for earthquake prediction". Proceedings of the National Academy of Sciences of the United States of America. 93 (9): 3787–3794. Bibcode:1996PNAS...93.3787D. doi:10.1073/pnas.93.9.3787. PMC 39438. PMID 11607666 – via NCBI.
- —; Richards-Dinger, Keith B. (2010). "Earthquake Recurrence in Simulated Fault Systems". Seismogenesis and Earthquake Forecasting: The Frank Evison Volume II. pp. 233–250. doi:10.1007/978-3-0346-0500-7_15. ISBN 9783034604994.
- —; Richards-Dinger, Keith (2012). "RSQSim Earthquake Simulator". Seismological Research Letters. 83 (6): 983–990. Bibcode:2012SeiRL..83..983R. doi:10.1785/0220120105.
