= Ogallala Aquifer =

Water table aquifer beneath the Great Plains in the United States of America

Coordinates: 36°59′26″N 101°26′52″W

Saturated thickness of the Ogallala Aquifer in 1997 after several decades of intensive withdrawals. The breadth and depth of the aquifer generally decrease from north to south.

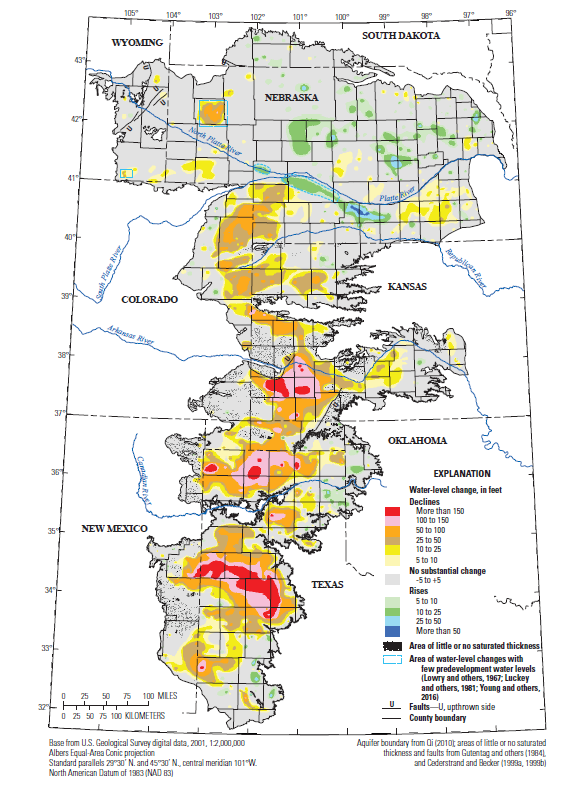
Regions where the water level has declined in the period 1950–2015 are shown in yellow and red; regions where it has increased are shown in shades of blue. Data from the USGS

Groundwater withdrawal rates (fresh water, all sources) by county in 2000. Source: National Atlas

The Ogallala Aquifer (oh-gə-LAH-lə) is a shallow water table aquifer surrounded by sand, silt, clay, and gravel located beneath the Great Plains in the United States.

As one of the world's largest aquifers, it underlies an area of approximately 174,000 sq mi (450,000 km^{2}) in portions of eight states (South Dakota, Nebraska, Wyoming, Colorado, Kansas, Oklahoma, New Mexico, and Texas). It was named in 1898 by geologist N. H. Darton from its type locality near the town of Ogallala, Nebraska. The aquifer is part of the High Plains Aquifer System, and resides in the Ogallala Formation, which is the principal geologic unit underlying 80% of the High Plains.

Large-scale extraction for agricultural purposes started after World War II due partially to center pivot irrigation and to the adaptation of automotive engines to power groundwater wells. Today about 27% of the irrigated land in the entire United States lies over the aquifer, which yields about 30% of the ground water used for irrigation in the United States. The aquifer is at risk of over-extraction and pollution. Since 1950, agricultural irrigation has reduced the saturated volume of the aquifer by an estimated 9%. Once depleted, the aquifer will take over 6,000 years to replenish naturally through rainfall.

The aquifer system supplies drinking water to 82% of the 2.3 million people (1990 census) who live within the boundaries of the High Plains study area.

== General characteristics ==
The deposition of aquifer material dates back two to six million years, from the late Miocene to early Pliocene ages when the southern Rocky Mountains were still tectonically active. From the uplands to the west, rivers and streams cut channels in a generally west to east or southeast direction. Erosion of the Rockies provided alluvial and aeolian sediment that filled the ancient channels and eventually covered the entire area of the present-day aquifer, forming the water-bearing Ogallala Formation. In that respect, the process is similar to those currently prevailing in other modern rivers of the area, such as the Kansas River and its tributaries. The major differences are time and depth.

The depth of the Ogallala varies with the shape of then-prevailing surface, being deepest where it fills ancient valleys and channels. The Ogallala Formation consists mostly of coarse sedimentary rocks in its deeper sections, which transition upward into finer-grained material.

The water-saturated thickness of the Ogallala Formation ranges from a few feet to more than 1,000 feet (300 m). Its deepest part is 1,200 feet (370 m) and is generally greater in the Northern Plains. The depth of the water below the surface of the land ranges from almost 400 feet (120 m) in parts of the north to between 100 and 200 feet (30 and 61 m) throughout much of the south. Present-day recharge of the aquifer with fresh water occurs at an exceedingly slow rate, suggesting that much of the water in its pore spaces is paleowater, dating back to the most recent ice age and probably earlier. An impervious geological layer between the aquifer and surface of the land, combined with an arid climate, prevents much recharge from occurring.

Groundwater within the Ogallala generally flows from west to east at an average rate of a foot per day. Hydraulic conductivity, or the ability for a fluid (water) to move through porous material, ranges from 25 to 300 feet (7.6 to 91.4 m) per day. Water quality within the Ogallala varies with the highest quality for drinking and irrigation in the northern region while the southern region had the poorest. Human and natural processes over the past 60 to 70 years, including irrigation density, climate, and nitrogen applications, have caused higher concentrations of contaminants including nitrates. Nitrate levels generally meet USGS water quality standards, but continue to gradually increase over time. This trend can impact the future groundwater sustainability for portions of the aquifer.

== Aquifer water balance ==
An aquifer is a groundwater storage reservoir in the water cycle. While groundwater is a renewable source, reserves replenish relatively slowly. The USGS has performed several studies of the aquifer, to determine what is coming in (groundwater recharge from the surface), what is leaving (water pumped out and baseflow to streams), and what the net changes in storage are (rise, fall or no change).

The USGS estimated that total water storage was about 2,925,000,000 acre-feet (3,608 km^{3}) in 2005. Withdrawals from the Ogallala Aquifer for irrigation amounted to 26 km^{3} (21,000,000 acre⋅ft) in 2000. Since major groundwater pumping began in the late 1940s, overdraft from the High Plains Aquifer has amounted to 332,000,000 acre-feet (410 km^{3}), 85% of the volume of Lake Erie. Many farmers in the Texas High Plains, which rely particularly on groundwater, are now turning away from irrigated agriculture as pumping costs have risen and as they have become aware of the hazards of overpumping.

=== Groundwater recharge ===
The rate at which groundwater is recharged is limited by several factors. Much of the plains region is semiarid, with steady winds that hasten evaporation of surface water and precipitation. In many locations, the aquifer is overlain, in the vadose zone, with a shallow layer of caliche that is practically impermeable; this limits the amount of water able to recharge the aquifer from the land surface. However, the soil of the playa lakes is different and not lined with caliche, making these some of the few areas where the aquifer can recharge. The destruction of playas by farmers and development decreases the available recharge area. The prevalence of the caliche is partly due to the ready evaporation of soil moisture and the semiarid climate; the aridity increases the amount of evaporation, which in turn increases the amount of caliche in the soil. Both mechanisms reduce the amount of recharge water that reaches the water table.

Recharge in the aquifer ranges from 0.024 inches (0.61 mm) per year in parts of Texas and New Mexico to 6 inches (150 mm) per year in south-central Kansas.

=== Groundwater discharge ===
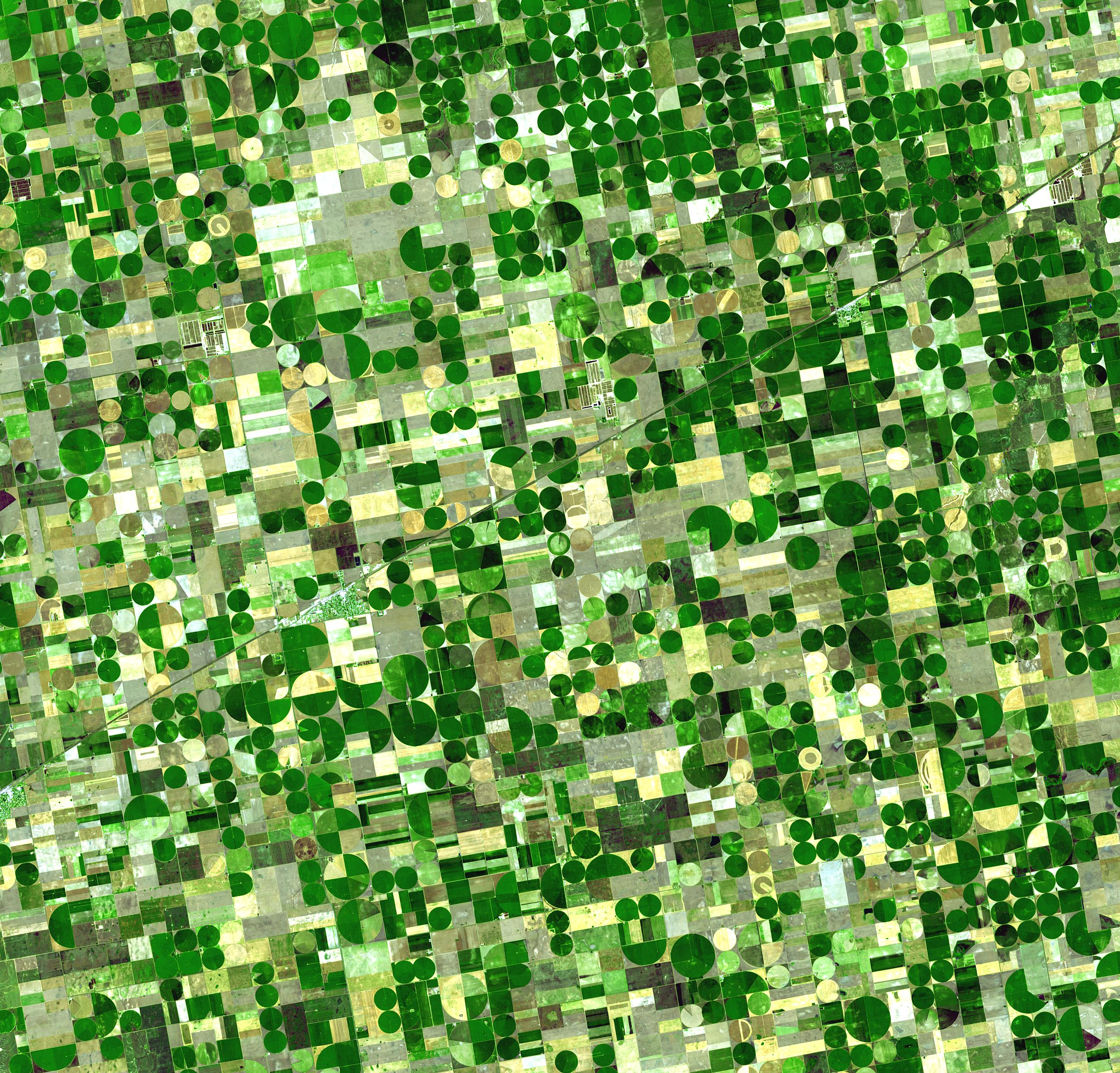
NASA ASTER image of a roughly 557 mi^{2} area of fields (1443 km^{2}) in Kansas watered from the Ogallala Aquifer with center pivot irrigation systems

The regions overlying the Ogallala Aquifer are some of the most productive regions in the United States for ranching livestock, and growing corn, wheat, and soybeans. The success of large-scale farming in areas that do not have adequate precipitation and do not always have perennial surface water for diversion has depended heavily on pumping groundwater for irrigation.

Early settlers of the semiarid High Plains were plagued by crop failures due to cycles of drought, culminating in the disastrous Dust Bowl of the 1930s. Only after World War II, when center-pivot irrigation became available, was the land mass of the High Plains aquifer system transformed into one of the most agriculturally productive regions in the world.

=== Change in groundwater storage ===
Ground water levels decline when the rate of extraction by irrigation exceeds the rate of recharge. At places, the water table was measured to drop more than 5 feet (1.5 m) per year at the time of maximum extraction. In extreme cases, the deepening of wells was required to reach the steadily falling water table. In the 21st century, recognition of the significance of the aquifer has led to increased coverage from regional and international journalists.

Water conservation practices (terracing and crop rotation), more efficient irrigation methods (center pivot and drip), and reduced area under irrigation have helped to slow depletion of the aquifer, but levels are generally still dropping in areas including southwestern Kansas and the Texas Panhandle. In other areas, such as parts of eastern and central Nebraska and of the region south of Lubbock, Texas, water levels have risen since 1980.

The center-pivot irrigator was described as the "villain" in a 2013 New York Times article, "Wells Dry, Fertile Plains Turn to Dust" recounting the relentless decline of parts of the Ogallala Aquifer. Sixty years of intensive farming using huge center-pivot irrigators has emptied parts of the High Plains Aquifer. Hundreds to thousands of years of rainfall would be needed to replace the groundwater in the depleted aquifer. In Kansas in 1950, irrigated cropland covered 250,000 acres (1,000 km^{2}); with the use of center-pivot irrigation, nearly three million acres (12,000 km^{2}) of land were irrigated. In some places in the Texas Panhandle, the water table has been drained (dewatered). "Vast stretches of Texas farmland lying over the aquifer no longer support irrigation. In west-central Kansas, up to a fifth of the irrigated farmland along a 100-mile swath (160 km) of the aquifer has already gone dry."

The center-pivot irrigation system is considered to be a highly efficient system which helps conserve water. However, by 2013, as the water consumption efficiency of the center-pivot irrigator improved over the years, farmers chose to plant more intensively, irrigate more land, and grow thirstier crops rather than reduce water consumption--an example of the Jevons Paradox in practice. One approach to reducing the amount of groundwater used is to employ treated recycled water for irrigation; another approach is to change to crops that require less water, such as sunflowers.

Several rivers, such as the Platte, run below the water level of the aquifer. Because of this, the rivers receive groundwater flow (baseflow), carrying it out of the region rather than recharging the aquifer.

The $46.1-million Optima Lake dam in western Oklahoma was rendered useless when the dropping level of the aquifer drastically reduced flow of the Beaver River, the lake's intended source of water.

=== Accelerated decline in aquifer storage ===
The depletion between 2001 and 2008, inclusive, was about 32% of the cumulative depletion during the entire twentieth century. In the United States, the biggest users of water from aquifers include agricultural irrigation and oil and coal extraction. "Cumulative total groundwater depletion in the United States accelerated in the late 1940s and continued at an almost steady linear rate through the end of the century. In addition to widely recognized environmental consequences, groundwater depletion also adversely impacts the long-term sustainability of groundwater supplies to help meet the nation’s water needs."

According to Matthew Sanderson, a professor of sociology at Kansas State University, these trends are exacerbated by an agricultural subsidy system and a United States tax code that encourage overinvestment in water-using technology due to a treadmill of production. The treadmill of production is complemented by a treadmill of protection, a water conservation system whose policies delay effective long term water conservation measures to protect the water interests of its key industries in the short term. Robertson suggests federal policy reforms to increase incentives to conserve groundwater, such as amendments to the Conservation Reserve Program, along with increased restrictions on water use at the state level.

Since the 1940s, pumping from the Ogallala has drawn the aquifer down by more than 300 feet (90 m) in some areas. Producers have taken steps to reduce their reliance on irrigated water. Streamlined operations allow them to produce significantly greater yield using roughly the same amount of water needed four decades ago. Still, losses to the aquifer between 2001 and 2011 equated to a third of its cumulative depletion during the entire twentieth century. The Ogallala is recharged primarily by rainwater, but only about one inch of precipitation actually reaches the aquifer annually. Rainfall in most of the Texas High Plains is minimal, evaporation is high, and infiltration rates are slow.

During the 1990s, the aquifer held some three billion acre-feet of groundwater used for crop irrigation as well as drinking water in urban areas. The demand for the water outstrips its replenishment. The water level is particularly on the decline in Texas and New Mexico. Continued long-term use of the aquifer is "troublesome and in need of major reevaluation," according to historian Paul H. Carlson, professor-emeritus from Texas Tech University in Lubbock.

== Environmental controversies ==
=== Keystone Pipeline ===
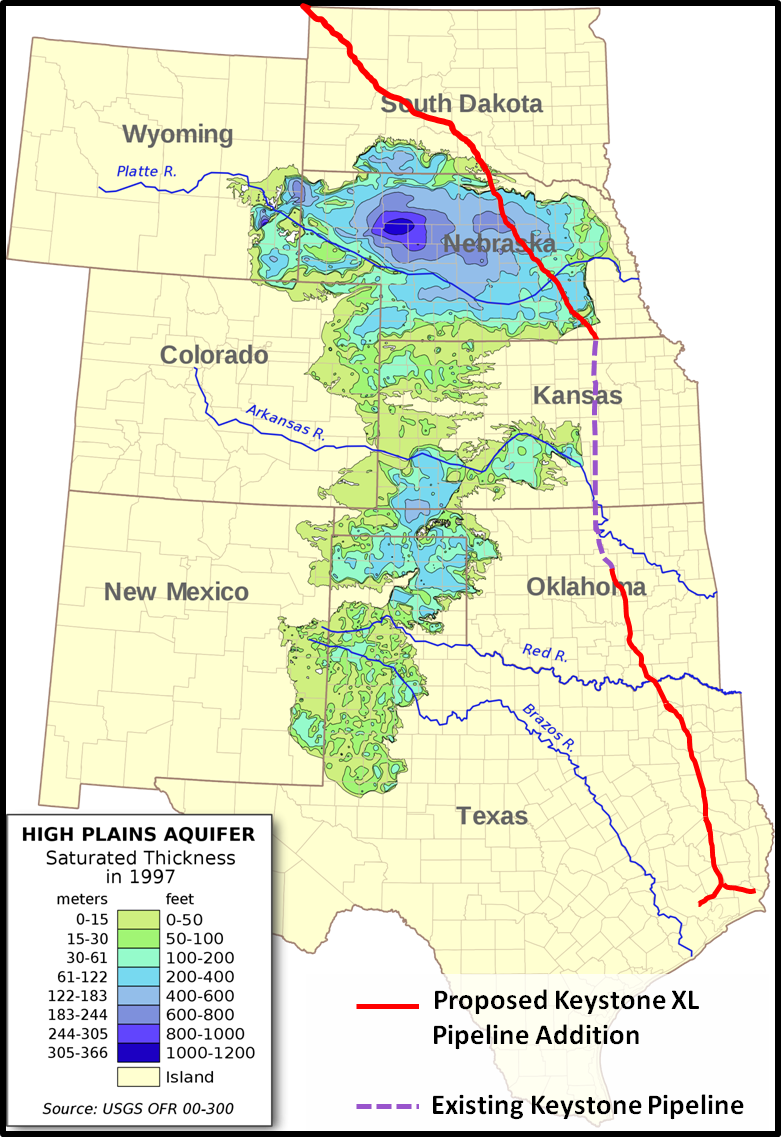
A map showing aquifer thickness of the Ogallala Aquifer with the proposed Keystone XL pipeline route laid over.

In 2008, TransCanada Corporation proposed the construction of the 1,661-mile (2,673 km) Keystone XL pipeline to carry oil from the Athabasca oil sands of Alberta to refineries near Houston, Texas. The proposed route of the pipeline crosses the eastern part of the Nebraska Sandhills; opponents of the route cite the risk to the Ogallala Aquifer posed by the possibility of contamination from spilled dilute bitumen.

Pipeline industry spokesmen have noted that thousands of miles of existing pipelines carrying crude oil and refined liquid hydrocarbons have crossed over the Ogallala Aquifer for years, in southeast Wyoming, eastern Colorado and New Mexico, western Nebraska, Kansas, Oklahoma, and Texas. The Pioneer crude oil pipeline crosses east-west across Nebraska, and the Pony Express pipeline, which crosses the Ogallala Aquifer in Colorado, Nebraska, and Kansas, was being converted as of 2013 from natural gas to crude oil, under a permit from the Federal Energy Regulatory Commission (FERC).

As the lead agency in the transboundary pipeline project, the U.S. State Department commissioned an environmental-impact assessment as required by the National Environmental Policy Act of 1969 (NEPA). The Environmental Impact Statement concluded that the project posed little threat of "adverse environmental impacts", the report was drafted by Cardno Entrix, a company that assisted both the Department of State and the Federal Energy Regulatory Commission in preparing environmental impact statements for other proposed TransCanada projects. Although it is "common for companies applying to build government projects to be involved in assigning and paying for the impact analysis", several opponents of the project suggested there could be a conflict of interest. In response to that concern, the Department of State's Office of the Inspector General conducted an investigation of the potential conflict of interest. The February 2012 report of that investigation states no conflict of interest existed either in the selection of the contractor or in the preparation of the environmental impact statement.

U.S. President Barack Obama "initially rejected the Keystone XL pipeline in January 2012, saying he wanted more time for an environmental review." On February 17, 2013, a rally at the National Mall drew an estimated 40,000 in protest of Keystone XL. In January 2014, the U.S. State Department released its Keystone pipeline Final Supplemental Environmental Impact Statement for the Keystone XL Project Executive Summary, which concluded that, according to models, a large crude oil spill from the pipeline that reached the Ogallala could spread as far as 1,214 feet (370 m), with dissolved components spreading as much as 1,050 ft (320 m) further.

Early in his first term, President Trump overturned previous President Obama's decision by signing executive memos in support of the Keystone XL pipeline in January 2017. On January 20, 2021, President Joe Biden signed an executive order to revoke the permit that was granted to TC Energy Corporation for the Keystone XL Pipeline (Phase 4). On June 9, 2021, TC Energy abandoned plans for the Keystone XL Pipeline.

== Conservation ==
States have adopted differing policies. Oklahoma modified its water rules in 2023, only issuing irrigation permits tied to sustainable yield estimates. In 2024, Kansas and Colorado gave local water management districts authority to limit withdrawals during drought years.

Texas follows a “right of capture” regime toward water usage, and a University of Texas projection in 2025 has indicated up to 70% of the Texas Panhandle will become unusable within 20 years if current pumping rates continue. Since 2010, the North Plains Groundwater Conservation District, which encompasses eight counties north of Amarillo, including Moore and Dallam Counties, has offered a $300,000 annual demonstration project to conserve water that farmers pump from the Ogallala Aquifer. Participating farmers grow corn with just over half of the water that they would normally require to irrigate the fields, or they plant several weeks later than customary. Pivot sprinklers are used in the project, rather than the more expensive drip irrigation. According to district manager Steve Walthour, conservation is essential considering declining levels of the aquifer. The local non-profit organization Ogallala Commons, named for the aquifer itself, which not only collaborates and supports the local communicates, also works to conserve the Ogallala Aquifer and the surrounding area.

In 2013, 11 farmers participated in the conservation program, with some planting in dry earth, rather than watered soil. They are leaving more space between plants, a technique that retains moisture for a longer period of time. Soil sensors permit farmers to gather accurate information about the moisture level of their crops. The motivation to save water comes from the district's regulations on extracting water from the aquifer. The United States Geological Survey determined the water level in the aquifer has dropped more in Texas than in any other state in the basin.

Farmers on their own land may draw water from the aquifer without charge. Pumping costs are low because the fuel used, natural gas, is inexpensive. The North Plains district first established limits on pumping in 2005 and tightened the regulations four years later. Certain wells are now required to have meters. Yet another challenge facing the district is that higher prices for crops from 2006 to 2008 have prompted some to plant additional fields and further increase the use of water from the aquifer. Regardless, by 2024 voluntary conservation districts in Texas saw less than 15% of eligible farmers participating in incentive programs.

== See also ==
- Aquifer
- Environmental science
- Fossil water
- Great Recycling and Northern Development Canal
- Groundwater
- Guarani Aquifer
- Hydrogeology
- Irrigation
- Laurentide Ice Sheet
- List of aquifers in the United States
- Llano Estacado
- Water table
- Western Interior Seaway, the salt-water strait that once covered the area of today's Ogalalla Aquifer.
