= Turlock Basin =

The Turlock Basin is a sub-basin of the San Joaquin Valley groundwater basin which occupies approximately 13,700 total square miles, making it the largest groundwater basin in California. The Turlock Basin makes up 542 square miles (347,000 acres) of this total. This aquifer is located within Merced and Stanislaus counties in the Central Valley bounded by the Tuolumne River to the north, the Merced River to the south and San Joaquin River to the west. The Sierra Nevada foothills bound the sub-basin to the east. Groundwater in the San Joaquin Valley occurs mostly in younger alluvial material. The Turlock Basin lies to the east of the city of Turlock. Groundwater in the Turlock Basin occurs in older alluvial deposits. Large portions of the San Joaquin Basin have experienced overdraft of water and infiltration of agricultural water pollutants, resulting in poor water quality.

== Land use and water quality ==
The primary land use overlying the Turlock Basin is crop production with more than 250,000 acres used for irrigated crops. From 1952 to 2006, urbanized areas have increased from 4000 to 20000 acres, mostly in the Turlock Irrigation District.

Potential areas of concern:

- In 2006, 39 of 513 wells tested above the maximum contaminant level (MCL) for various contaminants such as nitrates, pesticides and volatile organic carbons (VOCs).
- A study published in 2016 by engineering firm Todd Groundwater showed dropping groundwater levels in 38 wells over a 40-year period (1971-2011).

The City of Turlock receives its entire water supply for domestic use from groundwater. The character of the water is generally a sodium sulfate type, and some local wells have been historically closed due to DBCP pesticide poisoning.

In testing the ground water contents there was found to be 120 contaminants. In an area that relies on groundwater for essential needs it greatly diminishes the supply with contaminants present. The main contaminants we see are arsenic and nitrates. Arsenic is present naturally however the assessments done show in the 2014 study shows the contamination of Arsenic with a level of 11.8 ppb in the drinking water. From agriculture, fertilization, and increased urbanization we have also seen increased levels of nitrates. The nitrates are at 45 mg/L and pose a direst health risk. Nitrates in water can cause increased infant illness and death. The main water source is being contaminated by man, and is in return harming man with toxins in the ground water consumed.

== Basin management organization ==
The Turlock Groundwater Management Plan is identified as:

1. Maintain an adequate water level in the groundwater basin.
2. Protect groundwater quality and implement measures, where feasible, to reduce the potential movement of existing contaminants.
3. Monitor groundwater extraction to reduce the potential for land subsidence.
4. Promote conjunctive use of groundwater and surface waters.
5. Support and encourage water conservation.
6. Develop and support alternate water supplies, and educate users on the benefits of water recycling.
7. Continue coordination and cooperation between the TGBA members and customers.

== See also ==
- Soil contamination
