= George A. Thompson (geologist) =

American geologist

George A. Thompson (June 5, 1919 – May 12, 2017) was an American geologist.

== Biography ==
Thompson was born in Swissvale, Pennsylvania. In 1964, Thompson and Manik Talwani used gravity data where they demonstrated how the thin crust underlying the western United States during which he proved that the Basin and Range Province should be balanced by influx of mass. During the 1980s he and his students studied exposed parts of deep crust and upper mantle which explained that by combining interlayered mafic and ultramafic rocks can cause laminated and laterally discontinuous reflection of the Moho Province on deep seismic-reflections.

In 2008 he was awarded a Penrose Medal for his participation in helping to build a geophysics department. During his life he served as a chair at such departments as Geophysics from 1967 to 1986 and Geology department from 1979 to 1982. For two years, from 1987 to 1989, he was a dean of Stanford University's School of Earth Sciences and served as the Otto N. Miller Professor in the same department for 9 years.
