= Thickness (geology) =

Actual (1) and apparent (2) bed thickness. (3) Dip angle.

Thickness in geology and mining refers to the distance across a packet of rock, whether it be a facies, stratum, bed, seam, lode etc.

Thickness is measured at right angles to the surface of the seam or bed and thus independently of its spatial orientation. The concept of thickness came originally from mining language, where it was used mainly to indicate the workability of seams. It has since become an established term in earth science, for example in geology, for the depth of sedimentary rocks, in hydrogeology for the vertical extent of groundwater – i.e. the distance from the base of the groundwater layer to its surface – or in soil science for the vertical extent of soil horizons.

== Literature ==
- Walter Bischoff, Heinz Bramann, Westfälische Berggewerkschaftskasse Bochum: Das kleine Bergbaulexikon. 7th edn., Verlag Glückauf GmbH, Essen, 1988, ISBN 3-7739-0501-7.
- Heinz Kundel: Kohlengewinnung. 6. Auflage, Verlag Glückauf GmbH, Essen, 1983, ISBN 3-7739-0389-8.
