= James B. Macelwane Medal =

Annual award

The James B. Macelwane Medal is awarded annually by the American Geophysical Union to three to five early career scientists (no more than 10 years beyond having received their Ph.D.). It is named after James B. Macelwane, a Jesuit priest and one of the pioneers of seismology. The medal is regarded as the highest honor for young scientists in the field of Earth and Planetary Sciences. In 1984, Mary Hudson became the first woman to receive the award.

== Medal recipients ==
Source: AGU

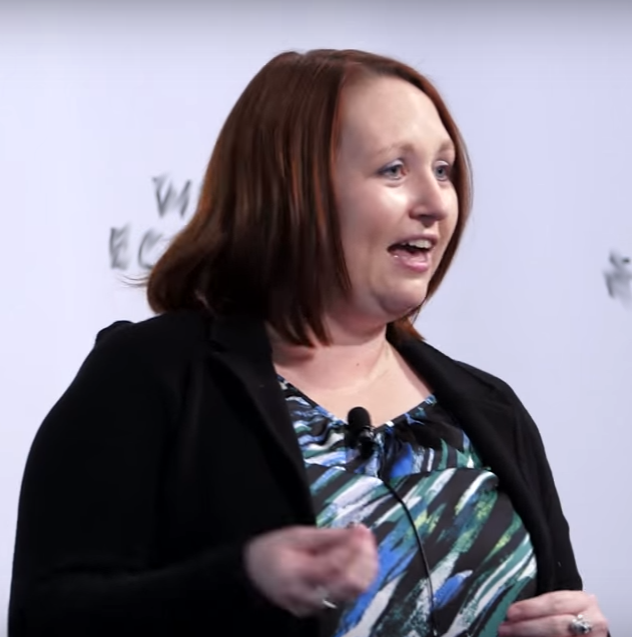
Colette Heald of MIT (2015 winner)

Year	Recipient
1962	James N. Brune
1963	Alexander J. Dessler
1964	Klaus Hasselmann
1965	Gordon J. F. MacDonald
1966	Don L. Anderson
1967	Manik Talwani
1968	Michael B. McElroy
1969	Richard S. Lindzen
1970	Lynn Sykes
1971	Carl I. Wunsch
1972	John Michael Wallace
1973	R. Allan Freeze
1974	Amos M. Nur
1975	Dan McKenzie; Vytenis M. Vasyliunas; Gerald Schubert
1976	John S. Lewis; Kurt Lambeck; Robert L. Parker
1977	Paul G. Richards; Ignacio Rodriguez-Iturbe; Christopher T. Russell
1978	John M. Edmond; Thomas E. Holzer
1979	Ralph J. Cicerone; Michael C. Kelley; R. Keith O'Nions
1980	Lawrence Grossman; Thomas Westfall Hill; Norman H. Sleep
1981	Ronald G. Prinn; David J. Southwood; Donald J. Weidner
1982	Rafael L. Bras; Donald W. Forsyth; Steven C. Wofsy
1983	William L. Chameides; Donald J. DePaolo; Thomas H. Jordan
1984	Mary K. Hudson; Raymond Jeanloz; John H. Woodhouse
1985	William H. Matthaeus; Susan Solomon; John M. Wahr
1986	Bradford H. Hager; Edward M. Stolper; Robert A. Weller
1987	J. Leslie Smith; Toshio Terasawa; Mary Lou Zoback
1988	Douglas R. MacAyeal; Marcia McNutt; Kevin B. Quest
1989	Richard G. Gordon; Seth A. Stein; William Roy Young
1990	Ellen R.M. Druffel; Steven M. Gorelick; Paul Segall
1991	Thomas A. Herring; Roderic L. Jones; Thorne Lay
1992	Eric Kunze; David G. Sibeck; Terry C. Wallace
1993	Michael Gurnis; David J. McComas; Margaret A. Tolbert
1994	Jeremy Bloxham; Daniel J. Jacob; John E. Vidale
1995	Stephen Fuselier; Jonathan I. Lunine; Jason Phipps Morgan
1996	David Bercovici; Dara Entekhabi; David Roy Hanson
1997	Edouard Bard; Marc Parlange; Robert van der Hilst
1998	Tuija I. Pulkkinen; Lars P. Stixrude;
1999	Jeroen Tromp; Rainer Hollerbach; Kenneth A. Farley
2000	Scott Doney; Erik Hauri; Quentin Williams
2001	Vassilis Angelopoulos; Daniel P. Schrag; Azadeh Tabazadeh
2002	George Katul; John M. Eiler; Michael Manga
2003	Kurt M. Cuffey; Guido Salvucci; Lianxing Wen
2004	Robin M. Canup; Daniel Sigman; David W. J. Thompson
2005	Paul Asimow; A. Hope Jahren; James T. Randerson
2006	Daniel J. Frost; Jerry Goldstein; Jun Korenaga
2007	Amy C. Clement; Jeanne Hardebeck; Francis Nimmo
2008	James Badro; Emily E. Brodsky; Diane E. Pataki
2009	Peter Huybers; Miaki Ishii; Benjamin P. Weiss
2010	David B. Lobell; Rosalind E. Rickaby; Jasper A. Vrugt
2011	Tanja Bosak; Nicolas Dauphas; Arlene Fiore; Adam Maloof; Christian Schoof
2012	David Richard Shelly; Gabriel J. Bowen; Josef Dufek;
2013	Jesse Kroll; Motohiko Murakami; Sonia I. Seneviratne;
2014	Rajdeep Dasgupta; Christian Frankenberg; J. Taylor Perron; David Shuster; Jessica Tierney
2015	Paul Cassak; Bethany L. Ehlmann; Colette L. Heald; Matthew G. Jackson; Katharine Maher
2016	Andy Hooper; Appy Sluijs; Gabriele Villarini; Maureen D. Long; Toshi Nishimura
2017	Yan Lavallée; Wen Li; Tiffany A. Shaw; Michael P. Lamb; Robert E. Kopp
2018	Steven J. Davis; Walter W. Immerzeel; Isaac R. Santos; Drew L. Turner; Caroline Ummenhofer
2019	Amir AghaKouchak; Anton Artemyev; Emily V. Fischer; Francis A. Macdonald; Erik van Sebille
2020	Kyle Armour; Sarah M. Horst; Brandon Schmandt; Yoshihide Wada; Kelly C Wrighton
2021	Elizabeth A Barnes; Christopher H.K. Chen; Ciaran J Harman; Christopher T. Reinhard; Anja Schmidt
2022	Jessica Creveling; Pierre Gentine; Lars N. Hansen; Scott Jasechko; Zhongwen Zhan
2023	Alice-Agnes Gabriel; Natalya A. Gomez; Kaiyu Guan; Allison N. Jaynes; Yuan Wang
2024	C. Brenhin Keller; Megan Konar; Alexandra G. Konings; Dustin M. Schroeder; Malte F. Stuecker
2025	Laura E. Condon; Roger R. Fu; Anna T. Trugman; Niko Wanders; Lei Zhao
2026	Leander D.L. Anderegg; Jacqueline Austermann; Mojtaba Sadegh; César Terrer; Alexander J. Turner

== See also ==
- List of geophysicists
- List of geophysics awards
- List of prizes named after people
