= Alexandra Konings =

American professor of Earth system science

- Education: Massachusetts Institute of Technology
- Scientific career
- Thesis: Microwave remote sensing of water in the soil - plant system (2015)

Alexandra G. Konings is an associate professor at Stanford University known for her research on water and carbon cycling. She was elected a fellow of the American Geophysical Union in 2024.

== Education and career ==
Konings received an S.B. from Massachusetts Institute of Technology in 2009 and an M.S. from Duke University in 2011. She earned her Ph.D. from Massachusetts Institute of Technology in 2015. In 2016 she moved to Stanford University as an assistant professor, and she was promoted to associate professor in 2023.

== Research ==
Konings' early research centered on the interactions between the land the atmosphere, and the use of passive microwave measurements to estimate the amount of water in soils. Her subsequent research examined how plants control their responses to arid conditions. She has also used satellite data to characterize the moisture content of soils, forests, and plants.

== Awards and honors ==
Konings was named a Sloan Foundation fellow in 2023, and she was elected a fellow of the American Geophysical Union and received the James B. Macelwane Medal in 2024.

== Selected publications ==
- Konings, Alexandra G.; Piles, Maria; Das, Narendra; Entekhabi, Dara (2017). "L-band vegetation optical depth and effective scattering albedo estimation from SMAP". Remote Sensing of Environment. 198: 460–470. doi:10.1016/j.rse.2017.06.037. hdl:10550/62895.
- Konings, A. G.; Williams, A. P.; Gentine, P. (2017). "Sensitivity of grassland productivity to aridity controlled by stomatal and xylem regulation". Nature Geoscience. 10 (4): 284–288. doi:10.1038/ngeo2903. ISSN 1752-0894.
- Konings, Alexandra G.; Gentine, Pierre (2017). "Global variations in ecosystem‐scale isohydricity". Global Change Biology. 23 (2): 891–905. doi:10.1111/gcb.13389. ISSN 1354-1013.
- Anderegg, William R. L.; Konings, Alexandra G.; Trugman, Anna T.; Yu, Kailiang; Bowling, David R.; Gabbitas, Robert; Karp, Daniel S.; Pacala, Stephen; Sperry, John S.; Sulman, Benjamin N.; Zenes, Nicole (2018-09-27). "Hydraulic diversity of forests regulates ecosystem resilience during drought". Nature. 561 (7724): 538–541. doi:10.1038/s41586-018-0539-7. ISSN 0028-0836.
