= Innermost inner core =

Solid core within the Earth's liquid core

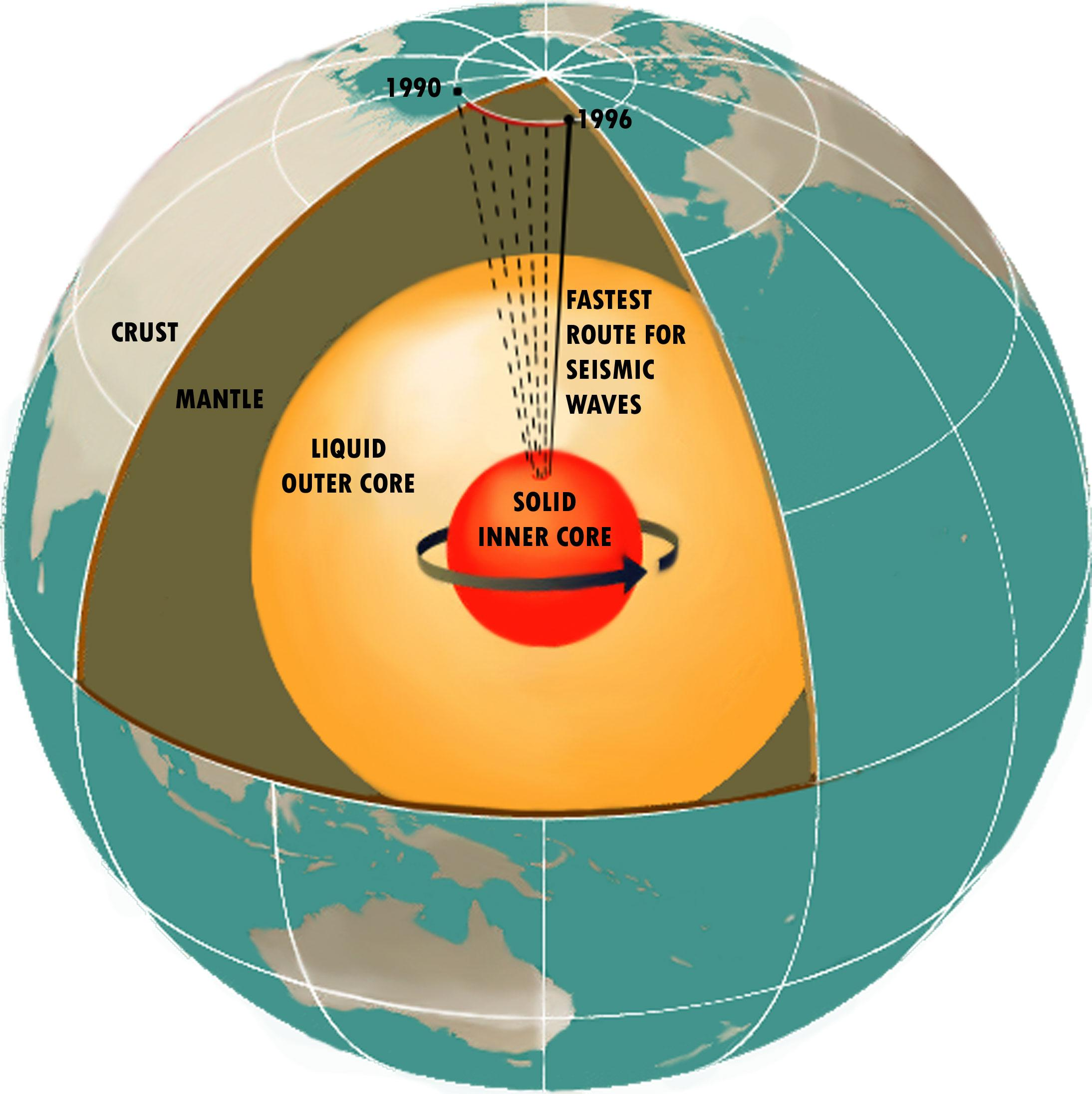
Earth's solid inner core

Earth is proposed to have an innermost inner core, distinct from its inner core. It is surrounded by the inner core, and is composed of solid iron in a different, but unknown structure from the inner core.

The existence of an inner core was proposed by Adam Dziewonski and Miaki Ishii to explain the discrepancies in certain fits to travel-time wave models of the inner core. It is contested whether the innermost inner core is a distinct entity, and it is claimed that the data can be explained in other ways.

== Proposed models ==
The innermost inner core model proposes a distinct laterally homogeneous anisotropic sphere within the inner core.

Estimates differ on the size of the innermost core. Dziewonski and Ishii think a radius of 300 km. Trampert et al. propose a different model, with a radius of 400 km.

== Implications ==
The existence of distinct anisotropic spheres within the inner core would represent evidence of two distinct periods of inner-core formation. It has also been theorized that the anisotropy observed represents an unknown phase change in iron. Understanding the anisotropic structure of the innermost inner core would be an important constraint on the inner core's composition.

== Other explanations ==
In 2012, Lythgoe et al. proposed the existence of anisotropic hemispheres within the inner core as an alternative to the innermost inner core theories. The study suggests that Ishii et al.'s conclusions were due to faulty statistical analysis, and claims the data are best described by hemispheric anisotropy.
