= Travel time =

Travel time may refer to

- Travel, movement of people between locations
- Travel journal, record made by a voyager
- Propagation delay, the time taken for an electrical signal or a certain number of bytes to be transferred
- Time of arrival, time for a radio signal to travel from transmitter to receiver
- Time-of-flight, time for a particle to travel through a medium
- Interaural time difference, difference in time that it takes a sound to travel between two ears
- Travel behavior, how people use transport
- Walking distance measure, distance that can be travelled in a certain amount of time
- Travel Time, a Philippine television program
- Travel Time, (in Seismology) time for the seismic waves to travel from the focus of an earthquake through the crust to a certain seismograph station → Travel-time curve

== See also ==
- Time in physics
