= Caroline C. Ummenhofer =

Climatologist and oceanographer

- Born: Caroline C. Ummenhofer; Freiburg, Germany
- Education: University of Wales
- Known for: Climate Research/Physical Oceanography in the Indian Ocean
- Scientific career
- Fields: Physical Oceanography
- Workplaces: The Woods Hole Oceanographic Institute (WHOI)
- Thesis: Southern Hemisphere Regional Precipitation and Climate Variability: Extremes, Trends and Predictability (unpublished) (2008)
- Website: https://ummenhofer.whoi.edu/

Caroline C. Ummenhofer is a physical oceanographer at the Woods Hole Oceanographic Institution where she studies extreme weather events with a particular focus on the Indian Ocean. Ummenhofer makes an effort to connect her discoveries about predicting extreme weather events and precipitation to helping the nations affected.

== Early childhood and education ==
Ummenhofer was born in Freiburg, Germany. In 2003, she graduated with a bachelor's degree in science from University of Wales, Bangor, UK, where she earned Joint Honours in Physical Oceanography and Marine Biology. Ummenhofer received her PhD in Applied Mathematics at The University of New South Wales (UNSW), Sydney, Australia. Ummenhofer wrote her thesis on the "Southern Hemisphere Regional Precipitation and Climate Variability: Extremes, Trends and Predictability," which won the Uwe Radok Award by the Australian Meteorological and Oceanographic Society in the category of atmosphere/ocean/climate science.

== Career and research ==
Ummenhofer was a Postdoctoral Fellow of Australian Research Council Centre of Excellence for Mathematics and Statistics of Complex Systems. She was a Vice-Chancellor Postdoctoral Fellowship at University of New South Wales in Sydney, Australia. Then Ummenhofer was a visiting fellow at Commonwealth Scientific and Industrial Research Organisation Marine and Atmospheric Research in Hobart. Ummenhofer began working at WHOI in 2012.

Ummenhofer teamed up with Timothy Walker, a history professor at University of Massachusetts Dartmouth, and Abigail Field, a history major, to collect climate data from log books from whaling ships in the 18th and 19th century. Around 5,000 whaling ship logs are kept in Southern New England due to the bustling whaling ports in New Bedford and Nantucket, which are home to the New Bedford Whaling Museum and Nantucket Whaling Museum respectively. Mean global temperature records begin around 1880, and many developing countries by the Indian Ocean only have reliable meteorology starting in the 1970s. Whaling logbooks hold daily accounts of vessel direction(s), landmarks, latitude/longitude, storm(s), precipitation, cloud direction, wind speed, wind direction, and temperature proxies. Temperature proxies include accounts of the tar used on the deck melting or fresh water on the ship freezing. Ummenhofer and Walker must cross check around 650 log books from similar areas to come up with a 8-9 points of data, which they put into the University's database. Whaling vessels are especially important to Ummenhofer work in the Indian Ocean because these ships sailed outside of established trade routes, and into more remote areas such as the Indian Ocean and Arctic Ocean. With these much older records, climate scientists like Ummenhofer may create better computer models to research the effects of climate change on vulnerable areas like the Indian Ocean.

=== Publications ===
In 2009, Caroline Ummenhofer and others published an article entitled "What causes southeast Australia's worst droughts?" in Geophysical Research Letters, which remains her most cited publication, and it is referenced in her nomination for the James B. Macelwane Medal. This study connected extreme droughts in Australia with conditions in Indian Ocean instead of the Pacific Ocean. Australia is currently in one of the most severe droughts in living memory coined the "Big Dry," which has been in effect since 1995. Before this study, the predominant method for predicting droughts were caused by the El Niño-Southern Oscillation (ENSO) and opposing La Niña events. Ummenhofer shows that the droughts taking place in Australia's western and southern border are instead caused by a lack of negative Indian Ocean Dipole (IOD) event. Data shows that the last negative IOD occurred in 1992, right before the start of the "Big Dry." In this study, Ummenhofer also brings awareness to the warming of the Indian Ocean due to climate change, and how this will affect the weather patterns in countries surrounding this body of water.

In 2016, L. Li, R. W. Schmitt, C. C. Ummenhofer, and K. B. Karnauskas published North Atlantic Salinity as a Predictor of Sahel Rainfall which predicted precipitation in the U.S. Southwest more accurately than conventional forecasting.

=== Selected publications ===
- Hahn, L.; Ummenhofer, C. C.; Kwon, Y.-O. (2018-09-16). "North Atlantic Natural Variability Modulates Emergence of Widespread Greenland Melt in a Warming Climate" (PDF). Geophysical Research Letters. 45 (17): 9171–9178. Bibcode:2018GeoRL..45.9171H. doi:10.1029/2018GL079682. hdl:1912/10638.
- Ummenhofer, Caroline C.; Meehl, Gerald A. (2017-06-19). "Extreme weather and climate events with ecological relevance: a review". Philosophical Transactions of the Royal Society B: Biological Sciences. 372 (1723) 20160135. doi:10.1098/rstb.2016.0135. PMC 5434087. PMID 28483866.
- Sen Gupta, Alexander; Santoso, Agus; Taschetto, Andréa S.; Ummenhofer, Caroline C.; Trevena, Jessica; England, Matthew H. (2009-06-01). "Projected Changes to the Southern Hemisphere Ocean and Sea Ice in the IPCC AR4 Climate Models". Journal of Climate. 22 (11): 3047–3078. Bibcode:2009JCli...22.3047S. doi:10.1175/2008JCLI2827.1. ISSN 0894-8755. S2CID 1759779.

== Awards and honors ==
- Uwe Radok Award by the Australian Meteorological and Oceanographic Society (2008)
- Humboldt Research Fellowship from the Alexander von Humboldt Foundation, Bonn, Germany (2014)
- James B. Macelwane Medal by the American Geophysical Union (2018)
