= ACRV =

ACRV may refer to:

- Crew Return Vehicle (or Assured Crew Return Vehicle)
- Armoured command and reconnaissance vehicle, the NATO name for artillery fire-control derivatives of the Soviet MT-LBu
- Arrhythmogenic cardiomyopathies of the right ventricle ( also known as Arrhythmogenic right ventricular dysplasia)
- The Australian Research Council Centre of Excellence for Robotic Vision, an Australian robotics research group with nodes at Queensland University of Technology, The University of Adelaide, Monash University, and the Australian National University
