= Miaki Ishii =

Canadian seismologist

- Education: University of Toronto, B.Sc., 1998; Harvard University, Ph.D., 2003
- Awards: James B. Macelwane Medal
- Scientific career
- Fields: Seismology
- Workplaces: Scripps Institution of Oceanography; Harvard University
- Thesis: Large-Scale Structure of the Earth's Mantle and Inner Core (2003)
- Doctoral advisor: Jeroen Tromp
- Website: Research site

Miaki Ishii is a seismologist and Professor of Earth and Planetary Sciences at Harvard University.

== Education and early career ==
Ishii attended secondary school at Midland Secondary School in Ontario, Canada, graduating in 1994. She then studied physics at the University of Toronto, where she received her Bachelor of Science degree with honors in 1998. During her undergraduate career, she conducted research on glacial rebound under the mentorship of Jerry X. Mitrovica.

Ishii attended Harvard University for her doctoral work under the mentorship of her supervisor Jeroen Tromp. There, she worked to measure variations in the lateral density of the Earth's mantle using seismic data. She found that there is heterogeneity in the composition of the lowermost mantle, with denser than average material beneath the Pacific Ocean and Africa. Together with seismologist Adam Dziewonski, Ishii also identified a region of the Earth's core, which they called the innermost inner core, which is located in the central part of the inner core and exhibits a distinct anisotropy—or pattern of wave propagation—relative to the bulk of the inner core. She published her doctoral work studying the Earth's mantle and inner core in a thesis entitled Large-Scale Structure of the Earth's Mantle and Inner Core and received her Ph.D. in 2003.

Between 2003 and 2005, Ishii worked as a postdoctoral researcher at Scripps Institution of Oceanography at the University of San Diego, working to collect High-Sensitivity Seismograph Network (Hi-net) data from Japan. She was able to back-project the data to map the 1200-km-long rupture that was associated with the 2004 Boxing Day earthquake and tsunami that devastated Sumatra. She and her colleagues, who included seismologist John Vidale, found that the event lasted 480 seconds and was characterized by a steady rupture velocity of 2.5 kilometers per second. The method they employed is now known as "beam-back projection" in which a series of seismometers are retroactively trained on the site of a single large seismic event and used to track where the seismic energy was released in time.

== Research ==
In 2006, Ishii became an Assistant Professor of Earth and Planetary Sciences at Harvard University. She was promoted to Associate Professor in 2010 and became a full Professor in 2013. There, she uses recordings of seismic energy to understand the composition and structure of the Earth's interior and to study the properties of earthquakes. One of the objectives of her research is to build faster methods to more accurately locate and characterize earthquakes that have occurred around the world in order to better understand what kinds of earthquakes to expect in the future.

Through her research program, Ishii has continued to refine and enhance the back projection methods she developed as a postdoctoral fellow. She integrates data taken by networks of seismic instruments from around the world, allowing her to more accurately map out the trajectory of earthquake waves. Ishii has also made use of global positioning system (GPS) network data in order to search for deformities within Earth's internal structure. The rocks and minerals that lie in the mantle—the layer of the Earth between the crust and the inner core—move in slow convection cycles due to the enormous heat and pressure that exist within the mantle. Ishii and her team are trying to understand the dynamics of those convection cycles over long periods of time, which can help scientists better understand the mantle's composition and potentially lead to more effective earthquake detection and warning systems.

When the Tōhoku earthquake and tsunami hit the Sendai region of Japan on March 11 2011, becoming the fourth biggest earthquake since 1900, Ishii applied her analysis methods to understand how the earthquake started and spread. Previously, scientists had not believed this region was capable of experiencing an earthquake of this magnitude. Through preliminary computer simulations, Ishii and colleagues found that a long segment (about 390 km) of the Japan Trench had ruptured during the earthquake over the course of two to three minutes. Ishii's analysis and visualization methodologies were also applied by The Washington Post reporters to characterize the Anchorage earthquake, a magnitude 7.0 earthquake which occurred in November 2018.

Ishii has also studied the effects of underground testing of nuclear weapons, which were carried out in the mid- to late-20th century. Unlike earthquakes, the precise epicenter of nuclear explosions is known; the waveform of an explosion is a simple spike. She leverages seismic data collected by a series of instruments belonging to the Preparatory Commission for the Comprehensive-Test-Ban Treaty Organization (CTBTO), a Vienna-based organization that monitors nuclear tests. In addition to seismic data, the instruments also collect infrasound, hydroacoustic, and radiation data.

Ishii uses the seismic data to take, what she calls, an "X-ray" of the planet, studying how seismic waves bounce when they hit different layers of the Earth's interior. Much like the X-rays and CAT-scans used in medical imagining, seismic waves bounce around and change direction based on the medium they pass through, which can give researchers an idea of the composition of Earth's interior. Ishii also uses these data to understand what happens at the boundary between the Earth's solid inner core and liquid outer core to understand how quickly the solid inner core is growing.

== Awards and honors ==
- Alice Wilson Award, Royal Society of Canada, 2004
- Charles F. Richter Early Career Award, Seismological Society of America, 2008
- James B. Macelwane Medal, American Geophysical Union, 2009
- Fellow, American Geophysical Union, 2009
- Kavli Fellow, Kavli Frontiers of Science Program, U.S. National Academy of Sciences, 2012
- IRIS/SSA Distinguished Lecturer, Incorporated Research Institutions of Seismology & Seismological Society of America, 2012 – 2013

== Selected publications ==
- Ishii, Miaki (2011). "High-frequency rupture properties of the M w 9.0 off the Pacific coast of Tohoku Earthquake". Earth, Planets and Space. 63 (7): 609–614. Bibcode:2011EP&S...63..609I. doi:10.5047/eps.2011.07.009.
- Ishii, Miaki; Shearer, Peter M.; Houston, Heidi; Vidale, John E. (2005). "Extent, duration and speed of the 2004 Sumatra–Andaman earthquake imaged by the Hi-Net array". Nature. 435 (7044): 933–936. Bibcode:2005Natur.435..933I. doi:10.1038/nature03675. PMID 15908984. S2CID 4415141.
- Ishii, M.; Dziewonski, A. M. (2002). "The innermost inner core of the earth: Evidence for a change in anisotropic behavior at the radius of about 300 km". Proceedings of the National Academy of Sciences. 99 (22): 14026–14030. doi:10.1073/pnas.172508499. PMC 137830. PMID 12374869.
- Ishii, Miaki; Tromp, Jeroen (2001). "Even-degree lateral variations in the Earth's mantle constrained by free oscillations and the free-air gravity anomaly". Geophysical Journal International. 145 (1). Oxford University Press (OUP): 77–96. Bibcode:2001GeoJI.145...77I. doi:10.1111/j.1365-246x.2001.00385.x. ISSN 0956-540X.
