= Jerry Goldstein =

Jerry Goldstein may refer to:

- Jerry Goldstein (physicist) (born 1970), space physicist
- Jerry Goldstein (producer), American producer, singer songwriter and musician
