= Maureen Long =

Maureen Long may refer to:

- Maureen D. Long, American geophysics professor
- Maureen Long, victim of English serial killer Peter Sutcliffe
- Maureen Johnson (Heinlein character), also known as Maureen Long, character in science fiction novels by American writer Robert A. Heinlein
