= Kyle Armour =

American researcher

- Born: Kyle C. Armour
- Education: University of California, San Diego (BS/BA); University of Washington (PhD)
- Scientific career
- Workplaces: University of Washington; Massachusetts Institute of Technology
- Thesis: Reversibility of sea ice and climate under global change (2012)
- Website: faculty.washington.edu/karmour/

Kyle Armour is a Climate Scientist and Professor in the School of Oceanography and the Department of Atmospheric Sciences at the University of Washington. His research investigates changes in Earth's climate system using a combination of oceanographic and atmospheric observations, numerical climate model simulations, and theory. He has been awarded with a James B. Macelwane Medal from the American Geophysical Union, a Sloan Research Fellowship, and an NSF CAREER Award, and he is a Fellow of the American Geophysical Union.

== Early life and education ==
Armour studied Physics and Applied Mathematics at UC San Diego, graduating in 2005. He received a PhD in Physics from the University of Washington in 2012. His doctoral research focused on Arctic climate change, as well as global climate change induced by greenhouse gases and aerosols.

== Research and career ==
After his PhD, Armour carried out research at Massachusetts Institute of Technology supported by a James S. McDonnell Foundation Postdoctoral Fellowship in Complex Systems. Since 2015 he has been on the faculty at the University of Washington, where he is jointly appointed between the School of Oceanography and the Department of Atmospheric Sciences.

Armour's research focuses on climate dynamics, physical oceanography, sea ice, and climate sensitivity. He has investigated a range of different research topics, including the reason that the Southern Ocean has warmed so much less than the rest of the globe during recent decades, how the climate sensitivity depends on the spatial pattern of global warming, and how to infer the equilibrium climate sensitivity when climate change feedbacks vary over time.

He was a lead author of the IPCC Sixth Assessment Report. He also coauthored community assessments of Earth's climate sensitivity and climate change feedbacks in the Polar regions of Earth.
