= Azadeh Tabazadeh =

Iranian geophysicist and author

- Education: University of California, Los Angeles
- Awards: Presidential Early Career Award for Scientists and Engineers (1999) James B. Macelwane Medal (2001) Henry G. Houghton Award (2003)
- Scientific career
- Fields: Atmospheric science
- Workplaces: NASA, Ames Research Centre Stanford University
- Thesis: A Study on the Physical and Chemical Properties of Stratospheric Aerosols
- Doctoral advisor: Howard Reiss Rich Turco

Azadeh Tabazadeh is an Iranian geophysicist and author known for her work in atmospheric science, work which has improved our understanding of the reactions that affect ozone depletion and highlighted the impact human activity has on the atmosphere.

== Early life and education ==
Tabazadeh grew up in Tehran, Iran, raised by her father Modjtaba, and her mother, Azar. Her father was a civil engineer. In 1973, when she was eight years old, she received a chemistry set as a present for Nowruz, from her uncle, a Geology student. She also received the memoirs of Marie Curie, which showed her for the first time that women could be successful scientists. These presents are key to developing her passion for science.

Tabazadeh was 14 when Ayatollah Khomeini overthrew Shah Reza Pahlavi in Iran and implemented Sharia law in 1979 . In 1982, following the start of the Iran-Iraq war, Tabazadeh persuaded her parents to send her abroad so she could pursue science, Their parents and younger sister stayed behind.

After arriving in the US, Tabazadeh lived in Mountain View with her mother's friend and studied English. She later attended University of California, Los Angeles, earning both her bachelor's and master's degrees in chemistry.

== Doctoral work ==
Tabazadeh continued at UCLA for a doctorate in physical chemistry, awarded in 1994. Part of her work aimed to understand the contributions of volcanic eruptions to chlorine levels in the stratosphere. She found that this chlorine precipitated before it reached the stratosphere, implying that human activity was still the major contributor of chlorine in the upper atmosphere. Her work was vital in ending 20 years of debate around this topic and supported the value of measures, such as the Montreal Protocol, in reducing chlorine emissions.

During her doctoral studies, she also contributed to the understanding of why the Antarctic atmosphere was more affected by ozone depletion than the Arctic. She showed that the colder temperature of the Antarctic stratosphere allowed for specific reactions to take place, leading to the loss of ozone; this was not the case in the warmer Arctic stratosphere. This led her to conclude that increasing Earth's surface temperatures, and therefore decreased stratospheric temperatures, could lead to more ozone depletion. This made her one of the first scientists to link ozone depletion and global warming.

== Professional career ==
After she finished her PhD, Tabazadeh moved to work at NASA Ames Research Centre. She continued to work on polar stratospheric clouds and their role in stratospheric chemistry. Her work showed that denitrification in the stratosphere was an essential factor in ozone loss. She also made additional contributions to understanding ice formation and removal of nitric acid in the upper troposphere.

== Honors ==
She visited the White House in 1999 as a recipient of the Presidential Early Career Award for Scientists and Engineers under the Clinton administration. She was also awarded the James B. Macelwane Medal from the American Geophysical Union in 2001 for “significant contributions to the geophysical sciences by young scientists of outstanding ability”. She automatically became a Fellow of the Union as a result.

In 2004 Tabazadeh left NASA to become a visiting professor at Stanford University where she worked on potential atmospheric impact of using hydrogen rather than fossil fuels as an energy source. She left Stanford in 2011 to write her memoirs.

=== Selected publications ===
- Tabazadeh, A., & Turco, R. P. (1993). Stratospheric chlorine injection by volcanic eruptions: HCI scavenging and implications for ozone. Science, 260(5111), 1082–1086.
- Tabazadeh, A., Santee, M. L., Danilin, M. Y., Pumphrey, H. C., Newman, P. A., Hamill, P. J., & Mergenthaler, J. L. (2000). Quantifying denitrification and its effect on ozone recovery. Science, 288(5470), 1407–1411.

== Personal life ==
Tabazadeh has 3 children.

== Awards and honours ==
- Presidential Early Career Award for Scientists and Engineers (1999)
- James B. Macelwane Medal, American Geophysical Union (2001)
- Fellow of the American Geophysical Union (2001)
- NASA Exceptional Scientific Achievement Medal (2001)
- Henry G. Houghton Award, American Meteorological Society (2003)
