= Sonia I. Seneviratne =

Swiss climate scientist

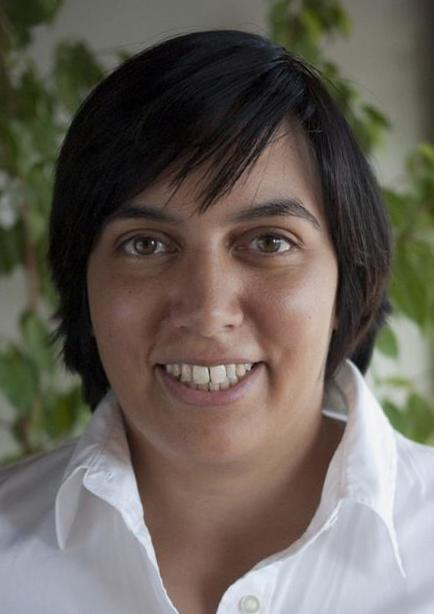
- Born: 5 June 1974 (age 52); Lausanne, Switzerland
- Education: University of Lausanne; ETH Zurich
- Scientific career
- Fields: climate science
- Workplaces: ETH Zurich
- Website: http://www.iac.ethz.ch/people/sonia

Sonia Isabelle Seneviratne (born on 5 June 1974 in Lausanne) is a Swiss climate scientist, professor at the Institute for Atmospheric and Climate Science of the ETH Zurich. She is a specialist of extreme climate events.

== Biography ==
Sonia Seneviratne studied biology at the University of Lausanne and environmental sciences at the ETH Zurich. In 2002, she received a PhD in atmospheric and climate science from ETH Zurich.

She worked as postdoctoral researcher at the National Aeronautics and Space Administration. Since 2007, she is professor at the Institute for Atmospheric and Climate Science of the ETH Zurich.

Sonia Seneviratne is a member of the Intergovernmental Panel on Climate Change (IPCC). She was a lead author of the IPCC's Special Report on Global Warming of 1.5 °C (2018) and a coordinating lead author of the Sixth Assessment Report (2021).

In 2025, her team published in Nature an analysis showing that the emissions of oil giants made 213 heatwaves (reported over 2000–2023) more intense and 200 times more likely.

== Honours ==
Sonia Seneviratne was included in Thomson Reuters's 2015 list of the most cited modern scientists. She was the lead author on a 2014 article in Nature Climate Change that showed no pause in the increase of hot temperature extremes from 1997 to 2012.

She is a Revelle Medal committee member. In 2013, she received the James B. Macelwane Medal from the American Geophysical Union. In 2014, she received a consolidator grant from the European Research Council.
