= Sarah Hörst =

American planetary scientist

- Born: 1981 or 1982 (age 44–45)
- Education: California Institute of Technology, BS, BS, 2004; University of Arizona, PhD, 2011
- Awards: Laboratory Astrophysics Division Early Career Award; James B. Macelwane Medal
- Scientific career
- Fields: Planetary science
- Workplaces: Johns Hopkins University; University of Colorado at Boulder
- Thesis: Post-Cassini Investigations of Titan Atmospheric Chemistry (2011)
- Doctoral advisor: Roger Vincent Yelle
- Website: https://sarahhorst.com

Sarah Hörst (born 1981 or 1982) is an American planetary scientist, writer, astronomer at the Space Telescope Science Institute, and professor at Johns Hopkins University. She is a lead investigator of the Dragonfly mission and a co-investigator of the Io Volcano Observer mission.

Hörst was a graduate student on the team at the Lunar and Planetary Laboratory that discovered that Saturn's largest moon, Titan, could hold the ingredients for life in its atmospheric haze.

== Early life and education ==
Hörst grew up in Great Falls, Montana and Gainesville, Florida. She said she was always interested in space, but growing up under the dark skies of Montana let her see the night sky in a way that light pollution elsewhere would have prevented. When Hörst was 13, her mother earned a Doctor of Philosophy (PhD) in biology at the age of 41, after having worked at a bookstore and as a research assistant. Hörst helped her mother with her dissertation by typing her references for her. Her father was a medical doctor. She said her parents encouraged her to pursue science. She graduated from Oak Hall School in 2000.

Hörst attended the California Institute of Technology in Pasadena, California for her undergraduate education and was on the school's track and field team. During the summer of her sophomore year as a planetary science major, she worked with her undergraduate advisor, Michael E. Brown, on a research project studying the Galilean moons. Brown had been interested in the possibility of weather patterns on Saturn's largest moon Titan and hired Hörst to work on the project. Using an amateur 14-inch Celestron telescope, Hörst spent six months imaging Titan, data which were used to calculate a light curve that could be examined for clouds. The work was published in the academic science journal Nature in 2002, which included Hörst in the acknowledgments and led to a grant for telescope time at Palomar Observatory. She graduated cum laude in 2004 with dual Bachelor of Science degrees, one in Planetary Sciences and the other in Literature. She said she was inspired by Sally Ride to obtain the latter degree.

Post-baccalaureate degree, Hörst took a break from school to recover from burnout and to decide whether to pursue an academic career in the climatology of Earth or the planetary science of other worlds. She said that she was compelled to do something that helped people, and didn't see how she could do that in her field. Originally intent on spending a year teaching, Hörst joined the Jet Propulsion Laboratory and worked on the image analysis for the Imaging Science Subsystem of the Cassini–Huygens spacecraft. While there, she suffered a leg injury that left a three-inch long scar on her leg. On the day the Huygens landed in 2005, Hörst said learned she "basically failed" the GRE Physics Test, believing she'd be unable to attend Graduate School and become a scientist. However, she was accepted into her choice of terminal degree programs.

In 2005, Hörst accepted a position at the University of Arizona (UA) studying the chemistry of Titan's atmosphere, where she earned the Peter B. Wagner Memorial Award for Women in Atmospheric Sciences in 2009 and the Kuiper Memorial Award in 2011. While there, she worked at the Lunar and Planetary Laboratory. Her team was the first to show that amino acids and nucleotide bases may be present in Titan's atmosphere. She also worked as a visiting student at the Institute of Planetology and Astrophysics of Grenoble between 2008 and 2011. She was awarded a PhD in Planetary Sciences in 2011.

Hörst experienced an incident of sexual harassment while in university, whom she had been told was a serial offender and did not name out of fear of retaliation. The university found no wrongdoing. After this experience, she suggested to conference organizers that, "the orientation of poster rows in meeting rooms should be changed so that presenters standing by theirs are always publicly visible and cannot be cornered".

== Research ==
Hörst worked at the University of Colorado Boulder as a National Science Foundation Astronomy and Astrophysics Postdoctoral Fellow in 2011 under Margaret A. Tolbert in the Cooperative Institute for Research in Environmental Sciences.

In 2014, Hörst joined Johns Hopkins University (JHU) as an assistant professor and Hopkins Extreme Materials Institute (HEMI) Fellow, specializing in the atmospheric chemistry of planets and their moons. She was later promoted to associate professor,

In 2025, she was a tenured professor.

In 2022, she was awarded the university's President's Frontier Award, nominated by Bloomberg Distinguished Professor and physicist Sabine Stanley. The award of $250,000 was to her and Alexis Battle to allow them to expand their research. Their awards were in recognition of their leading roles in their domains and that they were "on the cusp" of further success.

Hörst was an astronomer at the Space Telescope Science Institute.

In March 2018 Hörst's group demonstrated that they could simulate the atmosphere of alien worlds inside the laboratory, allowing them to analyse the composition of their haze. The study aided in the analysis of data collected by the James Webb Space Telescope.

She is part of the Science & Engineering team and a lead investigator for the Dragonfly mission to Titan. She is also a co-investigor of the Io Volcano Observer mission.

== Awards and honors ==
- Peter B. Wagner Memorial Award for Women in Atmospheric Sciences, University of Arizona, 2009
- Kuiper Memorial Award, University of Arizona, 2011
- National Science Foundation (NSF) Astronomy and Astrophysics Postdoctoral Fellow, University of Colorado Boulder, 2011
- Hopkins Extreme Materials Institute (HEMI) Fellow, Johns Hopkins University
- Laboratory Astrophysics Division (LAD) Early Career Award, American Astronomical Society, 2020
- James B. Macelwane Medal, American Geophysical Union, 2020
- President's Frontier Award, Johns Hopkins University, 2022

== Science communication and advocacy ==
Hörst's work has appeared in Smithsonian, as well as on SciShow and the BBC News. She works with primary and secondary school teachers to enable them to use planetary science in their classroom. She has appeared on The Planetary Society's show Planetary Radio and maintained an active Twitter account using the handle "PlanetDr". As of 2025, she had moved to Bluesky with the same handle.

At JHU, Hörst has been a part of changing the culture of academia for women in astronomy and speaking up. She told Scientific American that if she "had to sit quietly during faculty meetings, [she]'d have quit." She was described by Quanta Magazine as "one of the more outspoken astronomers fighting sexual harassment in the astronomy community" and is also among scientists actively engaged in promoting a healthy work–life balance. She assists the community in code of conduct drafting and bystander intervention training. She also fights for reform at NASA to make reporting pipelines that enable victims to easily report behavior and for the agency to remove the perpetrators. She also teaches the graduate students on her team to take time off and only allows emails to be sent during working hours.

== Selected publications ==
Hörst, S. M. (2017). "Titan's atmosphere and climate". Journal of Geophysical Research: Planets. 122 (3): 432–482. arXiv:1702.08611. Bibcode:2017JGRE..122..432H. doi:10.1002/2016JE005240. ISSN 2169-9100.

Cable, Morgan L.; Hörst, Sarah M.; Hodyss, Robert; Beauchamp, Patricia M.; Smith, Mark A.; Willis, Peter A. (March 14, 2012). "Titan Tholins: Simulating Titan Organic Chemistry in the Cassini-Huygens Era". Chemical Reviews. 112 (3): 1882–1909. doi:10.1021/cr200221x. ISSN 0009-2665.

Hörst, S. M.; Vuitton, V.; Yelle, R. V. (2008). "Origin of oxygen species in Titan's atmosphere". Journal of Geophysical Research: Planets. 113 (E10) 2008JE003135. Bibcode:2008JGRE..11310006H. doi:10.1029/2008JE003135. ISSN 0148-0227.

Hörst, Sarah M.; He, Chao; Lewis, Nikole K.; Kempton, Eliza M.-R.; Marley, Mark S.; Morley, Caroline V.; Moses, Julianne I.; Valenti, Jeff A.; Vuitton, Véronique (March 5, 2018). "Haze production rates in super-Earth and mini-Neptune atmosphere experiments". Nature Astronomy. 2 (4): 303–306. arXiv:1801.06512. Bibcode:2018NatAs...2..303H. doi:10.1038/s41550-018-0397-0. ISSN 2397-3366.

He, Chao; Hörst, Sarah M.; Lewis, Nikole K.; Yu, Xinting; Moses, Julianne I.; Kempton, Eliza M.-R.; Marley, Mark S.; McGuiggan, Patricia; Morley, Caroline V.; Valenti, Jeff A.; Vuitton, Véronique (July 1, 2018). "Photochemical Haze Formation in the Atmospheres of Super-Earths and Mini-Neptunes". The Astronomical Journal. 156 (1): 38. arXiv:1805.10488. Bibcode:2018AJ....156...38H. doi:10.3847/1538-3881/aac883. ISSN 0004-6256.

Hörst, Sarah (January 19, 2014). "Dear Huygens: When you landed on Saturn's moon Titan, you changed my life". National Geographic.

Hörst, Sarah (August 26, 2013). "Probing Titan's Atmosphere". The Planetary Society.
