= Tuija Pulkkinen =

Finnish professor of space science and technology

Tuija I. Pulkkinen
- Education: University of Helsinki (MS, PHD)
- Awards: Macelwane Medal (1998); Julius Bartels Medal (2017)
- Scientific career
- Fields: Space Physics
- Workplaces: University of Helsinki; Finnish Meteorological Institute; Aalto University; University of Michigan
- Website: clasp.engin.umich.edu/people/pulkkinen-tuija/

Tuija I. Pulkkinen (born 1962) is a Finnish space physicist. Her primary research foci are studying the energy flow from the solar wind to the near-Earth space environment and the energy dissipation processes in the magnetosphere.

== Early life and education ==
Pulkkinen was born in 1962. She received M.Sc. and Ph.D. degrees in theoretical physics from the University of Helsinki in 1987 and 1992.

== Research and career ==
Pulkkinen's research interests span the Sun-Earth connection physics in a wide sense, including major contributions in empirical magnetic field modeling of the terrestrial magnetosphere, time-evolving current systems to describe transition from stable to an unstable state, observational studies of energy transfer processes in the magnetosphere -ionosphere system, and use of global MHD simulations to trace energy entering from the solar wind through the magnetopause, stored and processed in the magnetotail, and dissipated in the ionosphere.

Pulkkinen received the American Geophysical Union Macelwane Medal in 1998 for outstanding research by a young scientist and the Julius Bartels Medal of the European Geosciences Union in 2017. She is a member of the Finnish Academy of Sciences and Letters, Finnish Society of Sciences and Letters, Academia Europea, and an international member of the US National Academy of Sciences.

Pulkkinen was affiliated with the Finnish Meteorological Institute from 1998 to 2010. In 2011 she became Dean of the School of Electrical Engineering at Aalto University; she was vice president for Research at the same institution for 2014–2018. She started as Professor at the University of Michigan in 2018, and served as chair of the Department of Climate and Space Sciences and Engineering 2018-2025.

== Awards and honors ==
- 1988: Macelwane Medal, American Geophysical Union
- 2001: Member of the Finnish Academy of Science and Letters
- 2010: Member of the Finnish Society of Sciences and Letters
- 2011: Foreign Member of the Academia Europaea.
- 2014: Foreign Member, U.S. National Academy of Sciences
- 2017: Julius Bartels Medal, European Geosciences Union
