= Mary Hudson (scientist) =

Space scientist

Mary K. Hudson
- Born: January 6, 1949 (age 77); Santa Monica, California
- Education: University of California, Los Angeles
- Scientific career
- Thesis: Equatorial spread F : Low frequency modes in a collisional plasma (1974)
- Doctoral advisor: Charles F. Kennel
- Doctoral students: Elena Belova

Mary Hudson (born January 6, 1949) is the Eleanor and Kelvin Smith Distinguished Professor of Physics at Dartmouth College. She is known for her research on the space weather dynamics that occur due to solar eruptions. She was elected a fellow of the American Geophysical Union in 1984.

== Education and career ==
While in college, Hudson worked for the McDonnell-Douglas Corporation as a mathematician and earned her B.S. from the University of California, Los Angeles (UCLA) in 1969. She then worked for the Aerospace Corporation while working on her M.S. degree which she earned from UCLA in 1971. She earned her Ph.D. in 1974 from the University of California, Los Angeles. Following her Ph.D., Hudson joined the University of California, Berkeley where she remained until 1985 when she moved to Dartmouth College. In 1990 she was promoted to professor. From 2010 until 2016, she retained an affiliate position at the National Center for Atmospheric Research in the High Altitude Observatory.

== Research ==
Hudson's interest in space developed as a child raised during the space race who had her own childhood telescope. Starting with her Ph.D. research, Hudson worked on the spread F problem, a phenomenon known to impact the transmission of signals by satellites. During her time at the University of California Berkeley, Hudson worked on the team led by Forrest Mozer that made the first electric field measurements in the ionosphere using the S3-3 satellite; the electrostatic shocks they measured accelerate electrons to make the auroras that can be seen at night in high latitudes. Hudson's research on geomagnetic storms, disruptions in the Earth's magnetosphere, establishes the conditions that cause radiation belts to form during these storms. From 2002 until 2013, Hudson co-lead the National Science Foundation-funded Center for Integrated Space Weather Modeling. Her research on this project centered on magnetosphere physics, especially the trapping of solar energetic particles, which has consequences for technology used on Earth. Hudson has also examined the movement of particles in radiation belts, the Van Allen radiation belts, that surround the Earth.

=== Selected publications ===
- Mozer, F. S.; Carlson, C. W.; Hudson, M. K.; Torbert, R. B.; Parady, B.; Yatteau, J.; Kelley, M. C. (1977-02-07). "Observations of Paired Electrostatic Shocks in the Polar Magnetosphere". Physical Review Letters. 38 (6): 292–295. Bibcode:1977PhRvL..38..292M. doi:10.1103/PhysRevLett.38.292. ISSN 0031-9007.
- Mozer, F.S.; Cattell, C.A.; Hudson, M.K.; Lysak, R.L.; Temerin, M.; Torbert, R.B. (1980). "Satellite measurements and theories of low altitude auroral particle acceleration". Space Science Reviews. 27 (2). Bibcode:1980SSRv...27..155M. doi:10.1007/BF00212238. ISSN 0038-6308. S2CID 122198330.
- Hudson, M. K.; Lotko, W.; Roth, I.; Witt, E. (1983). "Solitary waves and double layers on auroral field lines". Journal of Geophysical Research. 88 (A2): 916. Bibcode:1983JGR....88..916H. doi:10.1029/JA088iA02p00916. ISSN 0148-0227.
- Hudson, M. K.; Elkington, S. R.; Lyon, J. G.; Marchenko, V. A.; Roth, I.; Temerin, M.; Blake, J. B.; Gussenhoven, M. S.; Wygant, J. R. (1997). "Simulations of radiation belt formation during storm sudden commencements". Journal of Geophysical Research: Space Physics. 102 (A7): 14087–14102. Bibcode:1997JGR...10214087H. doi:10.1029/97JA03995. ISSN 0148-0227.
- Hudson, M.K.; Kress, B.T.; Mazur, J.E.; Perry, K.L.; Slocum, P.L. (2004). "3D modeling of shock-induced trapping of solar energetic particles in the Earth's magnetosphere". Journal of Atmospheric and Solar-Terrestrial Physics. 66 (15–16): 1389–1397. Bibcode:2004JASTP..66.1389H. doi:10.1016/j.jastp.2004.03.024.

== Awards and honors ==
In 1984, Hudson was elected a fellow of the American Geophysical Union and awarded the James B. Macelwane Medal, thereby becoming the first woman to receive the award. She gave the Van Allen Lecture for the American Geophysical Union in 2006, and received the James A. Van Allen Space Environments Award from the American Institute of Aeronautics and Astronautics in 2012. In 2017, she received the John Adam Fleming Medal from the American Geophysical Union.
