= Subtropical Indian Ocean Dipole =

Oscillation of sea surface temperatures

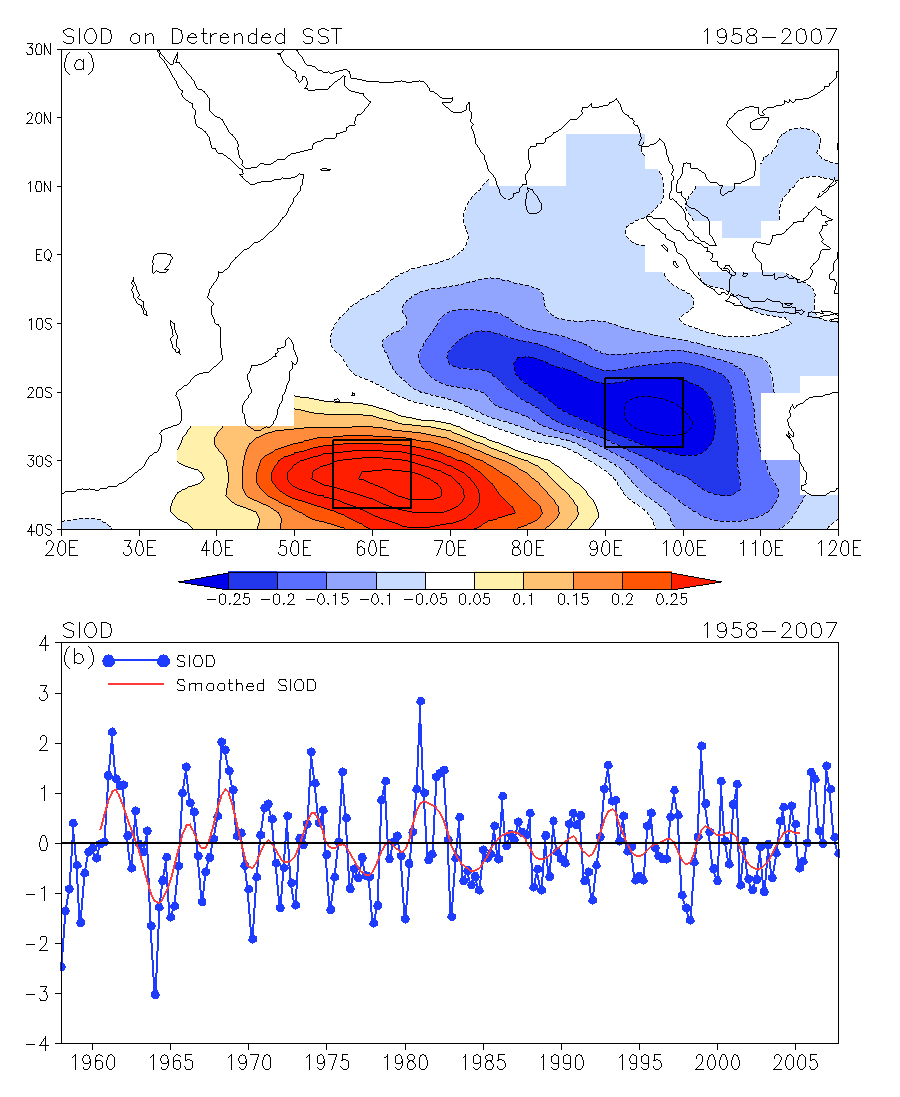
(a)Regressed SIOD Index on detrended Sea Surface Temperature (SST) (1958-2007). The western and eastern box used to calculate SIOD Index are indicated. Water temperatures in the southwestern Southern Indian Ocean are significantly higher than water temperature in the eastern part of South Indian Ocean, off Australia. In this image blue areas are colder than normal, while red areas are warmer than normal. (b)The normalized SIOD index during 1958-2007. The values are normalized by standard deviation of 0.65. Blue line indicates the original time series and the red curve are after applying 1-2-1 smoothing by ten times.

The Subtropical Indian Ocean Dipole (SIOD) is featured by the oscillation of sea surface temperatures (SST) in which the southwest Indian Ocean i.e. south of Madagascar is warmer and then colder than the eastern part i.e. off Australia. It was first identified in the studies of the relationship between the SST anomaly and the south-central Africa rainfall anomaly; the existence of such a dipole was identified from both observational studies and model simulations .

== The phenomenon ==
Positive phase of Subtropical Indian Ocean Dipole is characterized by warmer-than-normal sea surface temperature in the southwestern part, south of Madagascar, and colder-than-normal sea surface temperature off Australia, causing above-normal precipitation in many regions over south and central Africa. Stronger winds prevail along the eastern edge of the subtropical high, which become intensified and shifted slightly to the south during the positive events, leading to the enhanced evaporation in the eastern Indian Ocean, and therefore result in the cooling SST off Australia. On the other hand, reduced evaporation in the southwestern part causes reduced seasonal latent heat loss, and therefore results in increased temperature in the southwestern part, south of Madagascar. The negative phase of the SIOD is featured by the opposite conditions, with warmer SSTs in the eastern part, and cooler SSTs over the southwestern part. The physical condition favoring negative events is also just opposite. Also, Ekman transport accompanied with surface mixing process also plays a role in the formation of the SST dipole.

Generally speaking, the Subtropical Indian Ocean Dipole mode develops in December–January, peaks in February, then decays in the following two months, and finally dies down in May–June. The evolution and deformation process of the Subtropical Indian Ocean Dipole event is highly affected by the position of the subtropical high; atmospheric forcing plays a significant role in the evolution process of the Subtropical Indian Ocean Dipole event.

== The SIOD and Indian Summer Monsoon ==
Subtropical Indian Ocean Dipole related anomalies over the Southeastern Indian Ocean is also suggested to impact the position of Mascarene high and thus the Indian summer monsoon. Positive Subtropical Indian Ocean dipole events during boreal winter are always followed by weak Indian Summer Monsoons. During positive SIOD events, the Mascarene High shifting southeastward from austral to boreal summer causes a weakening of the monsoon circulation system by modulating the local Hadley cell during the Indian Summer Monsoon event. The effect is reversed during Negative dipole events.

== The SIOD and southwestern Australia rainfall ==
Southwest Australia dry(wet) years are corresponding to anomalously cool(warm) waters in the tropical/subtropical Indian Ocean and anomalously warm(cool) waters in the subtropics off Australia, and these appear to be in phase with the large-scale winds over the tropical/subtropical Indian Ocean, which modify SST anomalies through anomalous Ekman transport in tropical Indian Ocean and through anomalous air–sea heat fluxes in the subtropics, which also alter the large-scale advection of moisture to the Southwestern Australia coast.

The spatial pattern of the dry(wet) composite SSTA shifted to the east of the spatial pattern of the positive(negative) Subtropical Indian Ocean Dipole event(previous definition of SIOD), and the calculation based on the Subtropical Indian Ocean Dipole Index may need re-consideration when the relationship between southwestern Australia rainfall and SIOD index is studied, which may require further work.

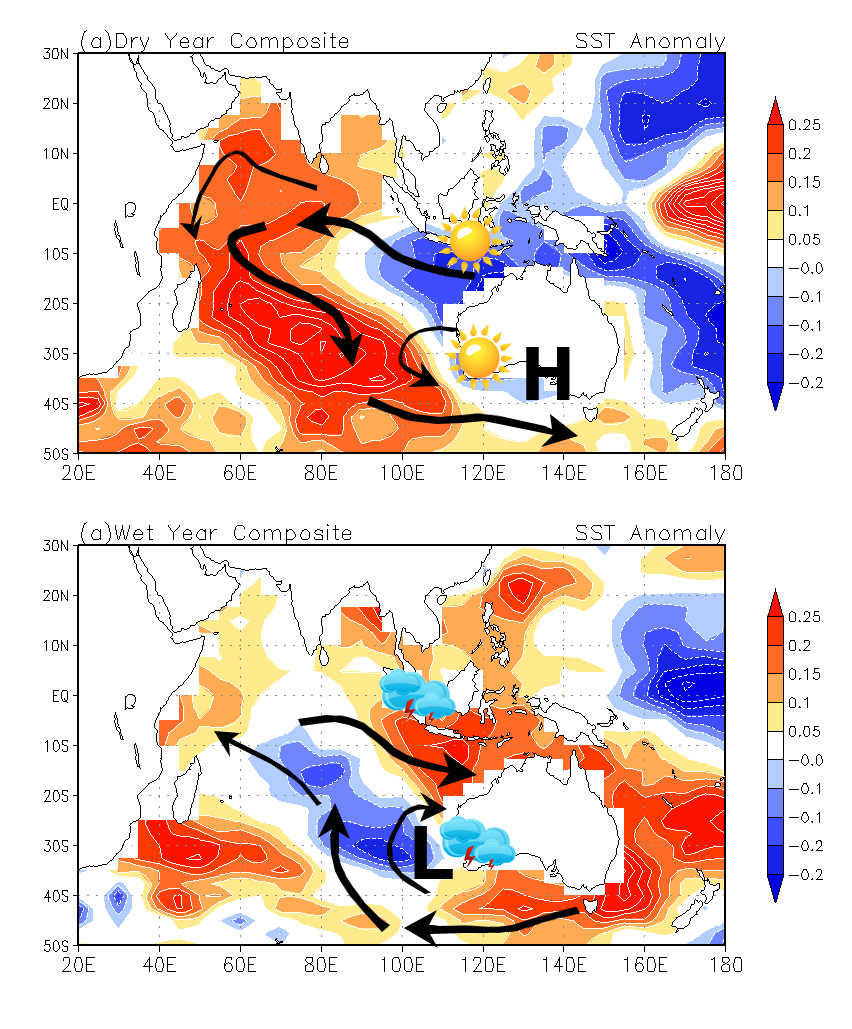
the connection between Indian Ocean climate condition and (a) dry and (b) wet years over SWWA. SST anomalies are shown in colors. Wind anomalies are indicated as bold arrows, pressure anomalies are shown by H (high) and L (low), and rainfall anomalies are represented by sun/cloud symbols. Dry and wet years are from (England et al. 2006).

== The SIOD and southeastern Africa rainfall ==
Positive SIOD events also cause increased summer rains over large parts of southeastern Africa by bringing enhanced convergence of moisture. Higher temperature over the Southwestern Indian Ocean warm pole results in increased evaporation, and this moist air is advected to Mozambique and eastern South Africa, which is strengthened by the low pressure anomaly generated over this warm pole.

== Other impact ==
The Subtropical Indian Ocean Dipole event is suggested to be accompanied with similar dipole mode events in the Pacific and subtropical southern Atlantic, and linked with the Antarctic circumpolar wave.

It has also been suggested that the Subtropical Indian Ocean Dipole has impacts on the seasonal ocean-atmosphere gas exchanges in the southern Indian Ocean. Also, field experiments indicate that the warm anomalies related to southwestern warm pole are conductive to the reduction of the oceanic carbon dioxide uptake.

== The SIOD Index ==
The Subtropical Indian Ocean Dipole Index is computed from SST anomaly difference between western (55E°-65°E,37S°-27°S) and eastern (90°E-100°E,28°S-18°S) Indian Ocean.

== See also ==
- Indian Ocean Dipole
- Monsoon of Indian subcontinent
