= Colette Heald =

Canadian-born atmospheric scientist

Colette L. Heald
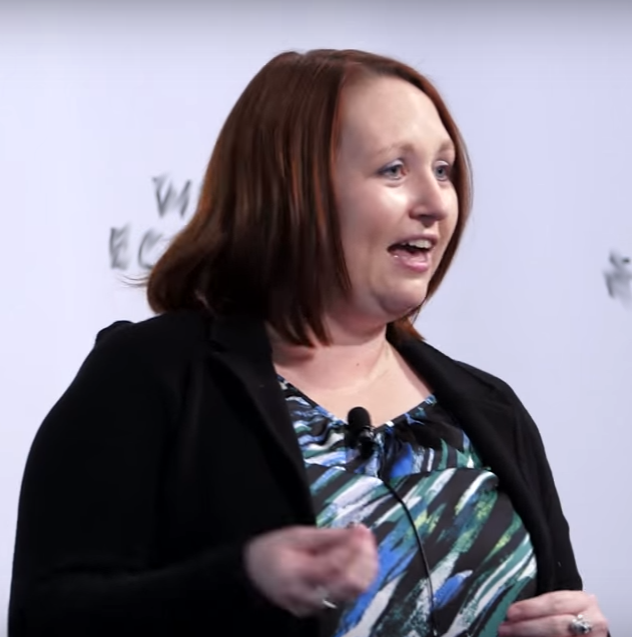
- Colette Heald at the 2015 World Economic Forum
- Born: Montreal, Quebec, Canada
- Education: Queen's University (B.Sc., 2000), Harvard University (Ph.D, 2005)
- Awards: Fellow of the American Geophysical Union
- Scientific career
- Fields: Atmospheric chemistry
- Workplaces: ETH Zurich; Massachusetts Institute of Technology; Colorado State University

Colette L. Heald is a Canadian-born professor at ETH Zurich who is an expert in atmospheric chemistry.

She received a BSc in engineering physics from Queen's University and a PhD in Earth and Planetary Science from Harvard University. From 2006 to 2007, she held the NOAA Climate and Global Change postdoctoral fellowship at the University of California, Berkeley. In 2008, she became an Assistant Professor of Atmospheric Science at Colorado State University. She moved to MIT in 2012, where she held positions in both the Department of Civil and Environmental Engineering and the Department of Earth, Atmospheric and Planetary Sciences. She was head of the Atmospheric Chemistry and Composition Research group at MIT. In 2024, Heald moved to ETH Zurich to lead the Atmospheric Chemistry group in the Institute for Atmospheric and Climate Science.

Her research interests include atmospheric gases and particles and their impacts on air quality, ecosystem health and climate. She is an expert on integrating global models and observations from all scales to investigate atmospheric composition. Early research by Heald demonstrated that there was limited understanding of the sources of organic aerosols in the atmosphere which led to considerable scientific investigation in this area, including her own work on reactive organic carbon in the atmosphere. She is also known for her work on natural aerosol sources (bioaerosol, sulfate from DMS, smoke from fires) and how land use change impacts atmospheric chemistry.

In 2015, she received the James B. Macelwane Medal and become a Fellow of the American Geophysical Union.
