= Laura E. Condon =

American hydrologist

- Education: Colorado School of Mines
- Scientific career
- Thesis: The role of large-scale water management in natural systems : connections, interactions and feedbacks (2015)

Laura E. Condon is a professor at the University of Arizona who is known for her research on water sustainabilty, climate change, and hydrology. She was elected a fellow of the American Geophysical Union in 2025.

== Education and career ==
Condon received a B.S. from Columbia University in 2008. She earned an M.S. (2012) and a Ph.D. (2015) from the Colorado School of Mines. Following her Ph.D., she worked at Syracuse University from 2016 until 2018, at which point she moved to the University of Arizona. As of 2026, she is a professor of hydrology and atmospheric sciences.

== Research ==
Condon's research uses a combination of modeling, observations, and statistical tools. Her early research developed hydrological models particularly in the field of groundwater research. More recently, she has examined the interaction between the movement of water and groundwater, and advanced research into estimating the water table depth in the United States.

== Awards and honors ==
In 2025 Condon received the James B. Macelwane Medal and was elected a fellow of the American Geophysical Union.

== Selected publications ==
- Condon, Laura E.; Maxwell, Reed M. (2015). "Evaluating the relationship between topography and groundwater using outputs from a continental‐scale integrated hydrology model". Water Resources Research. 51 (8): 6602–6621. doi:10.1002/2014WR016774. ISSN 0043-1397.
- Maxwell, Reed M.; Condon, Laura E. (2016-07-22). "Connections between groundwater flow and transpiration partitioning". Science. 353 (6297): 377–380. doi:10.1126/science.aaf7891. ISSN 0036-8075.
- Condon, Laura E.; Atchley, Adam L.; Maxwell, Reed M. (2020-02-13). "Evapotranspiration depletes groundwater under warming over the contiguous United States". Nature Communications. 11 (1). doi:10.1038/s41467-020-14688-0. ISSN 2041-1723. PMC 7018770. PMID 32054857.
- Condon, Laura E.; Kollet, Stefan; Bierkens, Marc F. P.; Fogg, Graham E.; Maxwell, Reed M.; Hill, Mary C.; Fransen, Harrie‐Jan Hendricks; Verhoef, Anne; Van Loon, Anne F.; Sulis, Mauro; Abesser, Corinna (2021). "Global Groundwater Modeling and Monitoring: Opportunities and Challenges". Water Resources Research. 57 (12). doi:10.1029/2020WR029500. hdl:1871.1/11e88075-fe7c-466d-bad9-7f99aaaa1e53. ISSN 0043-1397.
