= Amir AghaKouchak =

Iranian American civil engineer, academic and researcher

Amir Agha Kouchak
- Born: 1979 (age 46–47); Tehran, Iran
- Occupations: Civil engineer, academic and researcher
- Awards: American Society of Civil Engineers (ASCE) Huber Prize (2020); James B. Macelwane Medal (2019); Fellow of the American Geophysical Union (2019)

Academic background
- Education: B.Sc., Civil Engineering; M.Sc., Civil Engineering; Ph.D., Civil and Environmental Engineering
- Alma mater: K. N. Toosi University of Technology; University of Stuttgart
- Thesis: Simulation of remotely sensed rainfall fields using copulas

Amir Agha Kouchak (Persian: امیر آقا کوچک) is an Iranian American civil engineer, academic and researcher. He is a Professor of Civil Engineering, Environmental Engineering, and Earth System Science at University of California, Irvine.

Kouchak has published over 170 research papers focusing on hydrology, remote sensing, civil and environmental engineering, water resources, natural hazards, climate change, climate extremes, droughts, floods, and compound hazards. He is known for his contributions to analysis and understanding of natural hazards and their societal impacts, including droughts, floods, heat waves, and the interactions between inter-related compounds.

Kouchak is a fellow of the American Geophysical Union. He serves on the board of directors of the Consortium of Universities for the Advancement of Hydrologic Science, and is the Editor-in-Chief of the Earth's Future.

== Early life and education ==
Kouchak was born in 1979 in Tehran and grew up in Tehran and Karaj. He received his BS and MS in Civil and Environmental Engineering from K. N. Toosi University of Technology in 2003 and 2005, respectively. He then studied at University of Stuttgart in Germany and received his PhD in Civil and Environmental Engineering in 2010.

== Career ==
Kouchak joined University of California, Irvine as a postdoctoral researcher at the Center for Hydrometeorology and Remote Sensing in 2010. He was appointed as an Assistant Professor in the following year and later was promoted to Associate Professor in 2016. In 2019, he became a Professor of Civil Engineering, Environmental Engineering, and Earth System Science at the University.

== Research ==
Kouchak has conducted research focusing on hydrology, statistics, climatology and remote sensing to address global water resource issues.

=== Climatic extremes ===
Kouchak has conducted research on climatic extremes. He studied the 2014 California drought as a representative event caused by low precipitation and extremely high temperature. He presented a multivariate viewpoint as a methodology to assess the risk of concurrent extremes. His group also introduced a Bayesian inference framework for estimating stationary and non-stationary return levels and return periods of climatic extremes. His Nonstationary Extreme Value Analysis (NEVA) has been used in a wide range of studies on extreme events and their return periods (occurrence intervals) around the world.

Kouchak's group introduced the Global Integrated Drought Monitoring and Prediction System (GIDMaPS), which includes frameworks for monitoring and seasonal probabilistic drought prediction. His group also introduced the concept of anthropogenic drought and authored an article discussing the effect of human activity on the global ecosystem. Kouchak has also investigated co-occurrence of droughts and heatwaves and their underlying physical processes.

Kouchak has studied floods in several countries including the United States, Brazil and Iran. He studied the hydro-climatology of floods in Brazil and highlighted the different physical factors causing floods. Using self-organizing maps (SOMs) his group linked large-scale climatic processes to local-scale observations. His group applied the SOM clustering approach to classify a rainfall field into four categories, leading to four flood types of flood classes based on their spatiotemporal dynamics of rainfall fields.

Kouchak and colleagues have developed a multi-method global heatwave and warm-spell record (GHWR) publicly available online. AghaKouchak studied changes in frequency, severity, and duration of heat waves, and heat-related mortality in India. His research showed that even a small change in the overall mean temperatures significantly increases the chance of heat-related mortality.

=== Compound hazards ===
Kouchak has studied how different natural hazards interact with each other including ocean-fluvial floods. His group has introduced a multivariate framework for assessing combined risk of fluvial and ocean flooding considering the interactions between the primary flood drivers. In 2018, he authored an article focusing on how the natural hazards cascade to cause disasters including discussion on fire-snow and drought-heatwaves relationships.

His group published a paper in 2015 showing substantial increases in compound meteorological droughts and heat waves in the US. In follow up study, they showed that droughts are warming much faster than the average climate which can have significant societal impacts.

=== Remote sensing ===
Kouchak has worked on both radar and satellite remote sensing. He has published a toolbox for validation of satellite datasets against observations. He authored a paper on uncertainty quantification of remotely sensed radar rainfall data using a non-Gaussian copula-based model. He applied the proposed model for simulation of rainfall ensembles with applications to rainfall data validation, hydrologic simulations, and flood modeling. His group has used satellite observations and model simulations to generate the first global snow drought data set.

== Awards and honors ==
- 2012 - Frontiers of Engineering Education (FOEE) Award, National Academy of Engineering
- 2013-2014 - Hellman Fellowship Award
- 2016 - Distinguished Educator Award, Orange County Engineering Council
- 2017 - Hydrologic Sciences Early Career Award, American Geophysical Union
- 2019 - James B. Macelwane Medal for fundamental and innovative contributions to the study of hydrologic extremes and compound natural hazards, American Geophysical Union
- 2019 - Fellow, American Geophysical Union
- 2019 - Early Career Scientist Award, International Union of Geodesy and Geophysics
- 2020 - Walter L. Huber Civil Engineering Research Prize for notable contributions to the science of compound and inter-connected extreme weather events, American Society of Civil Engineers

== Bibliography ==
=== Books ===
- Simulation of Remotely Sensed Rainfall Fields Using Copulas (2010) ISBN 978-3-933761-92-7
- Extremes in a Changing Climate (2012) ISBN 978-94-007-4478-3.

=== Selected articles ===
- AghaKouchak, A., Cheng, L., Mazdiyasni, O., & Farahmand, A. (2014). Global warming and changes in risk of concurrent climate extremes: Insights from the 2014 California drought. Geophysical Research Letters, 41(24), 8847–8852.
- Hao, Z., & AghaKouchak, A. (2013). Multivariate standardized drought index: a parametric multi-index model. Advances in Water Resources, 57, 12–18.
- AghaKouchak, A., Farahmand, A., Melton, F. S., Teixeira, J., Anderson, M. C., Wardlow, B. D., & Hain, C. R. (2015). Remote sensing of drought: Progress, challenges and opportunities. Reviews of Geophysics, 53(2), 452–480.
- Zscheischler, J., Westra, S., Van Den Hurk, B. J., Seneviratne, S. I., Ward, P. J., Pitman, A., ... & Zhang, X. (2018). Future climate risk from compound events. Nature Climate Change, 8(6), 469–477.
- Cheng, L., AghaKouchak, A., Gilleland, E., & Katz, R. W. (2014). Non-stationary extreme value analysis in a changing climate. Climatic change, 127(2), 353–369.
