= Alexis Battle =

Stanford University alumni

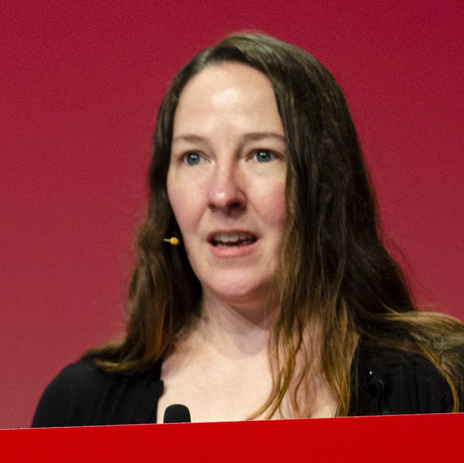
- in 2019
- Education: Stanford University
- Occupation: geneticist
- Employer(s): Google, Johns Hopkins University
- Known for: using AI and large scale genomic data

Alexis Battle works at Johns Hopkins University in Baltimore, Maryland. She applies artificial intelligence and large-scale genomic data to investigate how genes influence human health.

== Career ==
Battle earned her first degree in Symbolic Systems at Stanford University in 2003 and went on to complete a doctorate in Computer Science at the same institution in 2013. She worked at Google before joining the faculty at Johns Hopkins University.

In 2016, she was a Searle Scholar.

In 2022, the President of Johns Hopkins made an award of $250,000 to Sarah Hörst and the same amount to her to allow them to expand their research. Their awards were in recognition of their leading roles and that they were "on the cusp" of further success. Battle was nominated by the director of the Department of Biomedical Engineering, Michael Miller. Her research uses AI and large scale genomic data to try and understand the effect of genes on the human body.
