= Oak Hall School =

Prep school in Gainesville, Florida, US

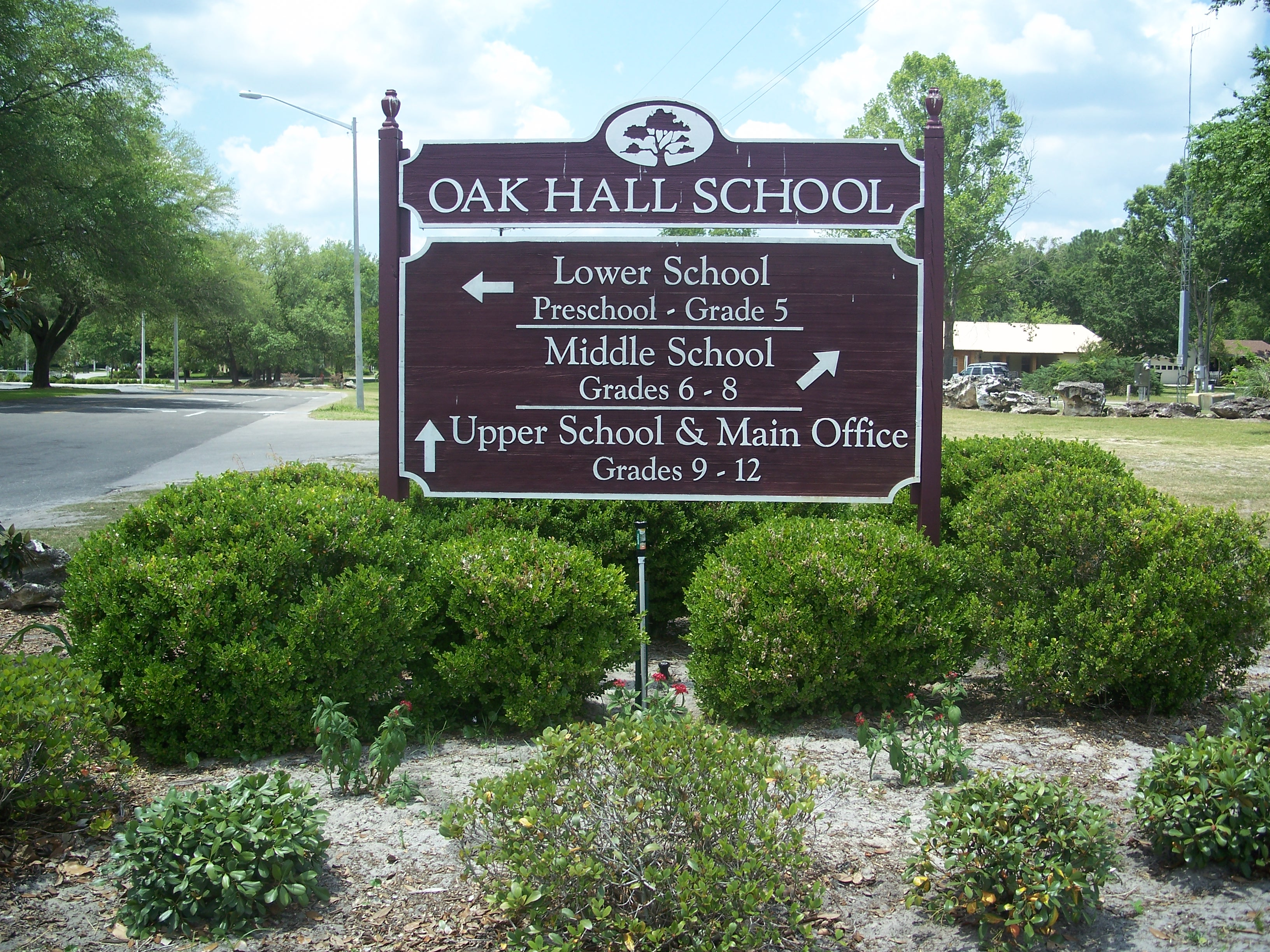

Location
- Gainesville, Florida, Alachua County, Florida; 29.6387416°N 82.4297057°W

Information
- School type: Independent preparatory
- Motto: Scholarship, leadership, service
- Established: 1970
- Head of School: Karin Montini
- Grades: Pre-K through 12th
- Enrollment: ~750
- Colors: Burgundy and Gold
- Mascot: Eagles
- Rival: St. Joseph Catholic School
- Website: www.oakhall.org

Oak Hall School is a private pre-K-through-12th grade school in Gainesville, Florida, founded in 1970.

== History ==
In 1970, the year Gainesville finished desegregating its high schools, Oak Hall was "founded to avoid public-school integration," the Washington Post reported. Although technically a private school, the school was largely built with funds provided by industrial revenue bonds raised by Alachua County.

The school charged annual tuition—$1,100 ($6,800 today)—which journalist H. G. Davis Jr. implied was a signifier of segregation academies in a Pulitzer Prize-winning series of editorials. School officials maintained that admissions were open to all "without regard to race, creed or color", a policy that enabled the school to win IRS approval for its tax exemption by January 1971.

The school remained all-white until 1977, when it accepted its first Black students: a pair of female track athletes whose tuition was sponsored by Robert Cade.

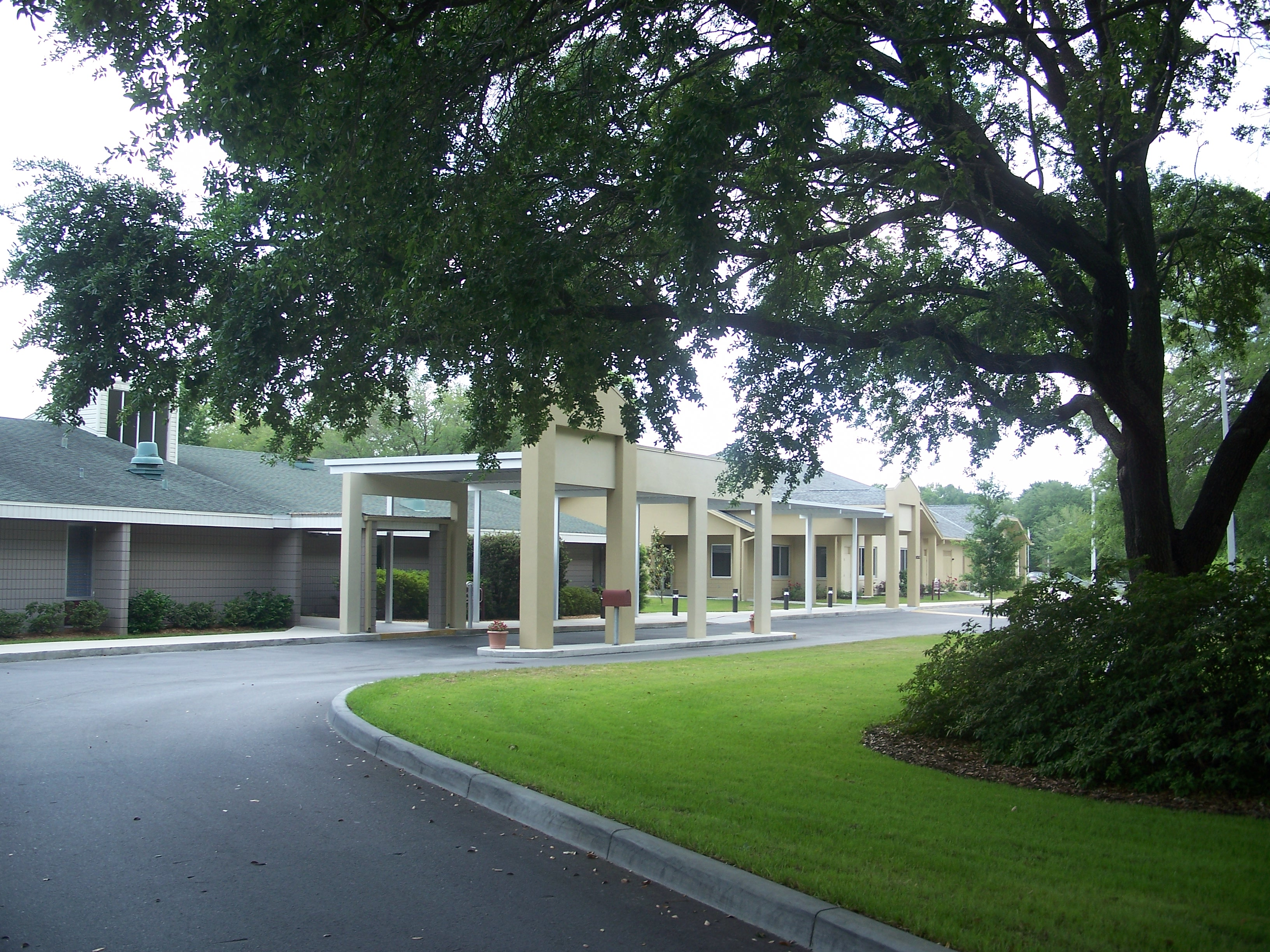
Lower School

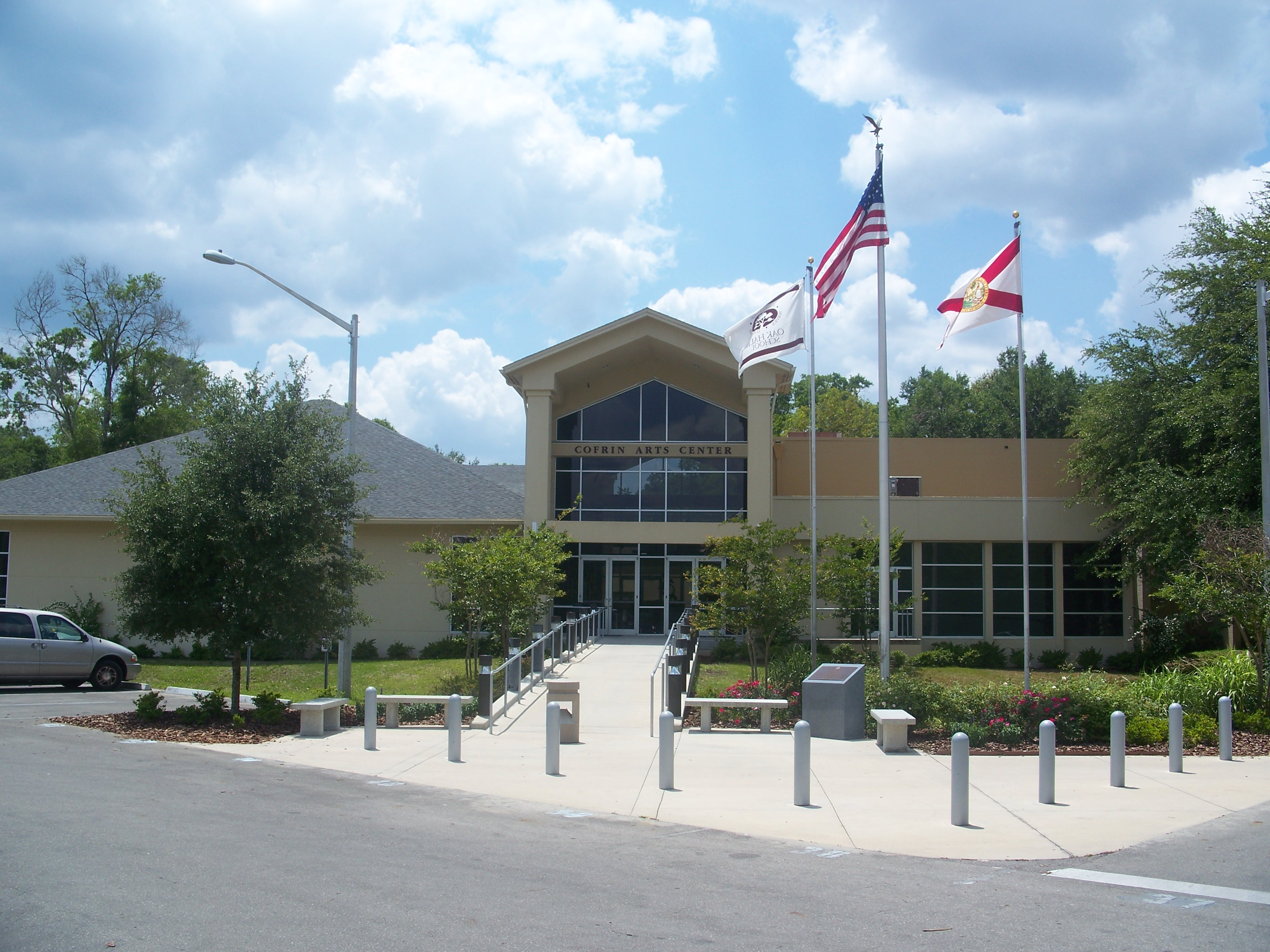
Cofrin Arts Center

== Arts and extracurricular activities ==
Oak Hall has a Spanish program and placed first in Division 1A at the Florida State Spanish Conference in 2010. It also has a Latin program and was placed first in the Senior Division and first in the Junior Division at the 2010 FJCL State Forum held between April 14, 2010, and April 17, 2010. The Senior Division won again in 2012, 2014. 2015, and 2016.

== Notable alumni ==
- Tamari Davis, world-champion sprinter
- Brian Ellington, MLB baseball player
- Sarah Hörst, professor of planetary science at Johns Hopkins University
- Will Muschamp, college football coach
