= Indian Ocean Dipole =

Climatic and oceanographic cycle affecting Southeast Asia, Australia and Africa

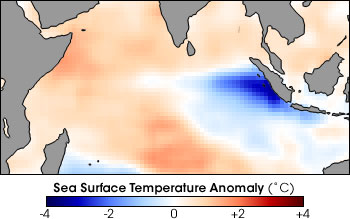
Water temperatures around the Mentawai Islands dropped about 4 °C during the height of a positive phase of the Indian Ocean Dipole in November 1997. During these events unusually strong winds from the east push warm surface water towards Africa, allowing cold water to upwell along the Sumatran coast. In this image blue areas are cooler than normal, while red areas are warmer than normal.

The Indian Ocean Dipole (IOD) is an irregular oscillation of sea surface temperatures in which the western Indian Ocean becomes alternately warmer (positive phase) and then colder (negative phase) than the eastern part of the ocean.

== Phenomenon ==
The IOD involves a periodic oscillation of sea-surface temperatures (SST), between "positive", "neutral" and "negative" phases. A positive phase sees greater-than-average sea-surface temperatures and greater precipitation in the western Indian Ocean region, with a corresponding cooling of waters in the eastern Indian Ocean—which tends to cause droughts in adjacent land areas of Indonesia and Australia. The negative phase of the IOD brings about the opposite conditions, with warmer water and greater precipitation in the eastern Indian Ocean, and cooler and drier conditions in the west.

The IOD also affects the strength of monsoons over the Indian subcontinent. A significant positive IOD occurred in 1997–98, with another in 2006. The IOD is one aspect of the general cycle of global climate, interacting with similar phenomena like the El Niño-Southern Oscillation (ENSO) in the Pacific Ocean.

The IOD phenomenon was first identified by Indian climate researchers in 1999 from the Indian Institute of Science.

An average of four each positive-negative IOD events occur during each 30-year period with each event lasting around six months. However, there were 12 positive IODs between 1980 and 2009, and no negative events between 1980 and 1992. The occurrence of consecutive positive IOD events is extremely rare with only two such events recorded, 1913–1914 and the three consecutive events from 2006 to 2008 which preceded the Black Saturday bushfires. Modelling suggests that consecutive positive events could be expected to occur twice over a 1,000-year period. The positive IOD in 2007 evolved together with La Niña, which is a very rare phenomenon that has happened only once in the available historical records (in 1967). A strong negative IOD developed in October 2010, which, coupled with a strong and concurrent La Niña, caused the 2010–2011 Queensland floods and the 2011 Victorian floods.

In 2008, Nerilie Abram used coral records from the eastern and western Indian Ocean to construct a coral Dipole Mode Index extending back to 1846 AD. This extended perspective on IOD behaviour suggested that positive IOD events increased in strength and frequency during the 20th century.

== Effect on Southeast Asian and Australian droughts ==
A positive IOD is associated with droughts in Southeast Asia^{,} and Australia. Extreme positive-IOD events are expected.

A 2009 study by Ummenhofer et al. at the University of New South Wales (UNSW) Climate Change Research Centre has demonstrated a significant correlation between the IOD and drought in the southern half of Australia, in particular the south-east. Every major southern drought since 1889 has coincided with positive-neutral IOD fluctuations including the 1895–1902, 1937–1945 and the 1995–2009 droughts.

The research shows that when the IOD is in its negative phase, with cool western Indian Ocean water and warm water off northwest Australia (Timor Sea), winds are generated that pick up moisture from the ocean and then sweep down towards southern Australia to deliver higher rainfall. In the IOD-positive phase, the pattern of ocean temperatures is reversed, weakening the winds and reducing the amount of moisture picked up and transported across Australia. The consequence is that rainfall in the south-east is well below average during periods of a positive IOD.

The study also shows that the IOD has a much more significant effect on the rainfall patterns in south-east Australia than the El Niño-Southern Oscillation (ENSO) in the Pacific Ocean as already shown in several recent studies.

== Effect on rainfall across East Africa ==
A positive IOD is linked to higher than average rainfall during the East African Short Rains (EASR) between October and December. Higher rainfall during the EASR are associated with warm sea-surface temperatures (SST) in the western Indian Ocean and low level westerlies across the equatorial region of the ocean which brings moisture over the East Africa region.

The increased rainfall associated with a positive IOD has been found to result in increased flooding over East Africa during the EASR period. During a particularly strong positive IOD at the end of 2019, average rainfall over East Africa was 300% higher than normal. This higher than average rainfall has resulted in a high prevalence of flooding in the countries of Djibouti, Ethiopia, Kenya, Uganda, Tanzania, Somalia and South Sudan. Torrential rainfall and increased risk of landslides over the region during this period often results in widespread destruction and loss of life.

It is expected that the Western Indian ocean will warm at accelerated rates due to climate change leading to an increasing occurrence of positive IODs. This is likely to result in the increasing intensity of rainfall during the short rain period over East Africa.

== Effect on El Niño ==
A 2018 study by Hameed et al. at the University of Aizu simulated the impact of a positive IOD event on Pacific surface wind and SST variations. They show that IOD-induced surface wind anomalies can produce El Nino-like SST anomalies, with the IOD's impact on SST being the strongest in the far-eastern Pacific. They further demonstrated that IOD-ENSO interaction is a key for the generation of Super El Ninos.

== 2020 IOD positive cycle ==
A positive IOD cycle was related to multiple cyclones that ravaged East Africa in 2019, killing thousands. The unusually active 2018–19 South-West Indian Ocean cyclone season was aided by warmer than normal waters offshore (starting with Cyclone Idai and continuing on to the subsequent cyclone season). Additionally, the positive IOD dipole contributed to Australian drought & bushfires (convective IOD cycle brings dry air down on Australia) and the 2020 Jakarta floods (convective IOD cycle prevents moist air from going south, thus concentrating it in the tropics), and more recently the 2019–21 East Africa locust infestation.

== See also ==
- Arctic dipole anomaly
- Subtropical Indian Ocean Dipole
