= Jasper A. Vrugt =

Dutch scientist, engineer, and applied mathematician

- Vrugt in 2011 pictured with the Dutch Master, Rembrandt.
- Born: 1976 (age 49–50); Amsterdam, the Netherlands
- Education: University of Amsterdam
- Occupation: Academic / Scientist
- Known for: AMALGAM, DREAM
- Awards: Sir Frederick McMaster Fellowship, CSIRO; Editors' Choice Award, Water Resources Research, American Geophysical Union; Young Scientist Award (Donath Medal), Geological Society of America; James B. Macelwane Medal, American Geophysical Union; Young Outstanding Scientist Award, European Geosciences Union; Fellow, American Geophysical Union; Fellow, Geological Society of America; Early Career Award in Soil Physics, Soil Science Society of America; NHV Hydrology Prize, Netherlands Hydrological Society (NHV); J. Robert Oppenheimer Fellowship, Los Alamos National Laboratory
- Scientific career
- Fields: surface hydrology, soil physics, hydrogeophysics, hydrometeorology, geophysics, applied mathematics
- Workplaces: University of California, Irvine; University of Amsterdam; Los Alamos National Laboratory
- Doctoral advisor: Willem Bouten
- Website: http://jasper.eng.uci.edu/

Jasper A. Vrugt (born 1976) is a Dutch scientist/engineer/applied mathematician known for his work in the earth sciences: surface hydrology, soil physics, hydrogeophysics, hydrometeorology, and geophysics. Vrugt is a professor at the University of California, Irvine and holds a joint appointment in the Department of Civil and Environmental Engineering and the Department of Earth System Science. He also holds a part-time appointment as associate professor at the University of Amsterdam, Faculty of Science (CGE).

== Life and career ==
Vrugt has received several awards. He received the 2011 Donath Medal (Young Scientist Award) of the Geological Society of America (GSA). As recipient of this medal, Dr. Vrugt was made GSA Fellow in 2012. In 2010, he received the James B. Macelwane Medal of the American Geophysical Union (AGU) for outstanding contributions in surface hydrology, soil physics, and hydrometeorology, and was simultaneously elected AGU Fellow. In the same year, he was also recognized with the Outstanding Young Scientist Award from the European Geosciences Union (EGU),. Vrugt is the first scientist to receive all three honors: the Donath Medal (GSA), James B. Macelwane Medal (AGU) and the Outstanding Young Scientist Award (EGU).

He is Associate Editor of Water Resources Research.

== List of scientific accomplishments and awards ==
=== Awards and recognition ===
- Sir Frederick McMaster Fellowship, CSIRO
- Fellow, Geological Society of America (GSA)
- Editors' Choice Award, Water Resources Research, American Geophysical Union
- Fellow, American Geophysical Union
- Young Scientist Award (Donath Medal), Geological Society of America
- Young Outstanding Scientist Award, European Geophysical Union
- James B. Macelwane Medalist, American Geophysical Union
- Early Career Award in Soil Physics, Soil Science Society of America
- Hydrology Prize 2004 - 2006, Netherlands Hydrological Society (NHV)
- Elsevier Top 50 of most talented young people in the Netherlands

== Photographs ==
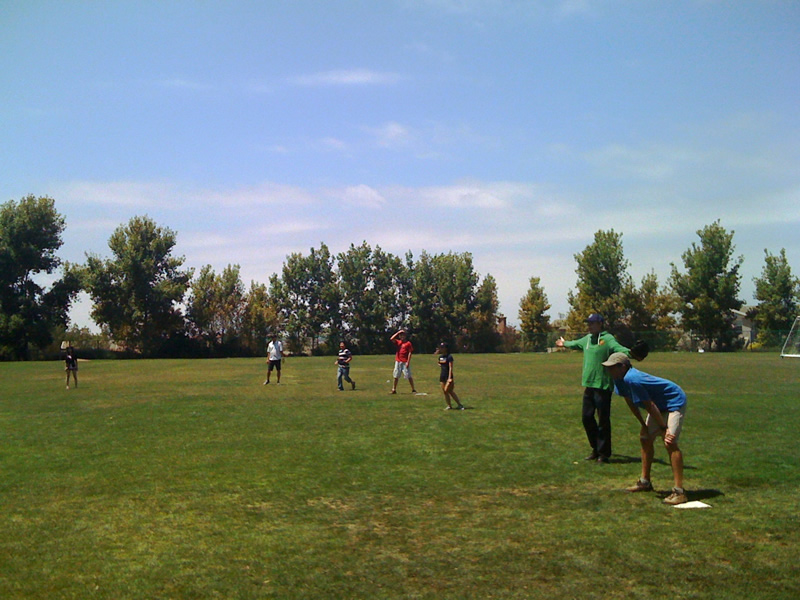
Vrugt (in green) playing softball with UC Irvine engineering faculty and students at annual Water & Environmental Engineering Picnic
