= Emily V. Fischer =

US atmospheric chemist and academic

- Born: 1979 or 1980 (age 46–47)
- Education: PhD, University of Washington
- Known for: atmospheric chemistry, PAN
- Awards: AGU James B. Macelwane Medal
- Scientific career
- Workplaces: Colorado State University
- Website: sites.google.com/rams.colostate.edu/fischer-group/

Emily V. Fischer is an atmospheric chemist and an associate professor in the department of atmospheric science at Colorado State University. She earned notoriety from her work on the WE-CAN project and on PAN, specifically its role in changing the distribution of oxidants in the troposphere. She has received many honors including the prestigious James B. Macelwane Medal which is "given annually to three to five early career scientists in recognition of their significant contributions to Earth and space science." Fischer is also a role model and activist in galvanizing support for women in STEM fields.

== Early life and education ==
Fischer was born 1979 or 1980 in Rhode Island. She was drawn into atmospheric science when, at age eleven, Hurricane Bob hit her home state in August 1991; blown away by nature's phenomenon, she called her local meteorologist to ask "what made wind".

After a year at Colby College, she transferred to the University of British Columbia, where she graduated with a B.S. in Atmospheric Science in 2002. In 2004, she earned M.S. in Earth Sciences from the University of New Hampshire, Durham. Finally, after studying transpacific air pollution on Mount Bachelor, OR, she earned her PhD in Atmospheric Sciences from the University of Washington in 2010.

== Career and research ==
Following her PhD research in 2011, Fischer became a NOAA Environmental Fellow at the Harvard University Center for the Environment. There, she "explored the processes controlling the distribution of the most important atmospheric oxidants, the hydroxyl radical and ozone." In 2013, she became an assistant professor at Colorado State University, where she works today and leads the Fischer Group, which focuses on studying the troposphere composition; some of the projects include "Fires to Farms: How do wildfire smoke driven changes in radiation impact crops and solar resources?", "Transformation and Transport of Ammonia (TRANS2AM)", "Leveraging Field-Campaign Networks for Collaborative Change," and many others. Her most notable work was done on the Western Wildfire Experiment for Cloud Chemistry, Aerosol Absorption and Nitrogen (WE-CAN) project. The goal of the project was to study both the chemical make-up and travel of compounds produced by wildfires. Additionally the project pioneered a satellite technique for measuring PAN that now gives scientists a panoramic perspective.

=== Select publications ===
- Fischer, E. V.; Jaffe, D. A.; Reidmiller, D. R.; Jaeglé, L. (2010). "Meteorological controls on observed peroxyacetyl nitrate at Mount Bachelor during the spring of 2008". Journal of Geophysical Research: Atmospheres. 115 (D3): D03302. Bibcode:2010JGRD..115.3302F. doi:10.1029/2009JD012776. ISSN 2156-2202.
- Fischer, E.V.; Dzepina, K.; Talbot, R. W.; Ries, L.; Roiger, A.; Singh, H. B.; Paulot, F.; Mao, J.; Millet, D. B. (2014-03-14). "Atmospheric peroxyacetyl nitrate (PAN): a global budget and source attribution". Atmospheric Chemistry and Physics. 14 (5): 2679–2698. Bibcode:2014ACP....14.2679F. doi:10.5194/acp-14-2679-2014. ISSN 1680-7316. PMC 7983850. PMID 33758588.
- Fischer, E. V.; Jacob, D. J.; Millet, D. B.; Yantosca, R. M.; Mao, J. (2012). "The role of the ocean in the global atmospheric budget of acetone". Geophysical Research Letters. 39 (1) 10.1029/2011gl050086. Bibcode:2012GeoRL..39.1807F. doi:10.1029/2011GL050086. ISSN 1944-8007. PMC 7983863. PMID 33758438.
- Gong, S. L.; Jeong, M.-J.; Jaffe, D. A.; Hsu, N. C.; Fischer, E. V. (2009-02-01). "A decade of dust: Asian dust and springtime aerosol load in the U.S. Pacific Northwest". Geophysical Research Letters. 36 (3): n/a. Bibcode:2009GeoRL..36.3821F. doi:10.1029/2008GL036467. ISSN 1944-8007.

== Awards and honors ==
- In 2019, Fischer received the James. B Macelwane medal from the American Geophysical Union
- In 2019, she was chosen by students in the CSU Atmospheric Science Department as professor of the Year.
- In 2018 Fischer received the CSU Graduate Advising and Mentorship Award.
- 2011-2013 she was a NOAA Climate and Global Change and a Harvard Center for the Environment Fellow.

== Public engagement ==
In 2014, Fischer along with fellow scientists launched a program Promoting Geoscience, Research, Education and Success (PROGRESS). Through "a professional development workshop, access to female mentors and role models, and online discussions and resources" PROGRESS aims "to introduce the women to geoscience careers, to establish connections among students, to help participants identify role models and the value of mentoring, [and] to discuss how to overcome expected hurdles."
