= Harvard–Adam Dziewonski Observatory =

- Station code: HRV
- Location: 42.5064°N 71.5583°W
- Elevation: 200 metres (660 ft)
- Network: Global Seismographic Network
- Source: doi:10.31905/EL3FQQ40

The Adam Dziewonski Observatory was put in service in 1960 to measure ground displacement and shaking that is caused by earthquakes and volcanic eruptions. Seismometers are the instruments that are used to capture ground motion.

For twenty years, two Bosch-Omori horizontal pendulum instruments were working in the basement of the Geological Museum at the Harvard University campus in Cambridge, Massachusetts. In 1928, the station was moved to the Oak Ridge Observatory at Harvard, Massachusetts.

== See also ==
- Adam Dziewonski
- Berkeley Seismological Laboratory
- Caltech Seismological Laboratory
- Global Centroid Moment Tensor
