= Elena Belova (physicist) =

Soviet-American plasma physicist

Elena V. Belova is a former Soviet and American physicist whose research involves the computer simulation of plasma, with applications ranging from the control of heat in tokamak-based fusion power to improved understanding of jets and spheromaks in the solar corona. She works for the United States Department of Energy as a principal research physicist at the Princeton Plasma Physics Laboratory in New Jersey. She is currently active in the area of MHD and hybrid simulations of the Field-Reversed Configurations, and numerical studies of MHD instabilities driven by the energetic neutral beam ions in NSTX.

== Education and career ==
Belova studied physics at the Moscow Institute of Physics and Technology, earning a bachelor's degree in 1984 and a master's degree in 1987. From 1987 to 1992, she worked at the Russian Space Research Institute in Moscow. in 1992, she emigrated to the US with her husband, physicist Alexander V. Khrabrov. She went to Dartmouth College for graduate study in physics, supervised by Mary Hudson. She finished her Ph.D. in 1997, and on completing her doctorate became a researcher at the Princeton Plasma Physics Laboratory.

== Recognition ==
Belova was the 2005 winner of the Katherine Weimer Award for Women in Plasma Science, given by the American Physical Society (APS) Division of Plasma Physics, "for pioneering analytical and numerical contributions to the fundamental physics of magnetically confined plasmas". She was named a Fellow of the American Physical Society in 2020, after a nomination from the Division of Plasma Physics, "for outstanding contributions to the development of novel numerical and theoretical models leading to improved understanding of the behavior of highly energetic particles and associated plasma instabilities in compact tori and spherical tokamaks".
