= Wen Lianxing =

Chinese seismologist and geophysicist

Wen Lianxing (Chinese: 温联星; born April 1968) is a Chinese seismologist and geophysicist. He is a professor at Stony Brook University. He was awarded the James B. Macelwane Medal in 2003 and elected a fellow of the American Geophysical Union. He is the first Chinese scientist to win the James B. Macelwane Medal.

== Biography ==
Wen was born in Shanghang, Fujian, China in 1968. He graduated from Shanghang No. 1 High School and was admitted to the University of Science and Technology of China (USTC) in 1983. After graduating in 1988, he studied at the Institute of Geophysics of the Chinese Academy of Sciences, and earned his master's degree in 1991. He later studied in the United States and earned his Ph.D. in geophysics from California Institute of Technology in 1998.

From 1998 to 2000 Wen was a research fellow at the Carnegie Institution for Science in Washington, DC. He has been a faculty member at the Department of Geosciences, Stony Brook University since 2000. He was a visiting professor at USTC from 2010-2019.

== Major Scientific Accomplishments ==
=== Discoveries of Earth's Deep Interior ===
Using seismic waves, Wen made many discoveries that have advanced our understanding of Earth's deep interior, particularly the inner core and the core-mantle boundary, where he resolved structural details that illuminate the origins of Earth's deep interior.

In the Earth's inner core, Wen discovered an east-west hemispheric differences in seismic properties, localized temporal changes at the surface, a mushy top layer, and distinct inner core surface topography. These discoveries provided new perspectives on core dynamics and inner-core boundary processes.

At the base of Earth's mantle, Wen identified two continental-scale thermochemical anomalies beneath Africa and the Pacific, temporal change of seismic structure in a decadal time scale, and numerous small-scale ultra-low velocity zones. Those discoveries revolutionized our understanding of Earth's thermochemical evolution, mantle dynamics, surface hotspot motions, and the origin of large-scale geochemical anomalies seen in volcanoes and ocean ridges.

=== High-precision Nuclear Monitoring ===
Wen developed advanced methods of seismic geo-positioning and low-yield event detection that transformed the scientific monitoring of underground nuclear explosions. His research group achieved an unprecedented high precision in pinpointing nuclear tests, locating North Korea's post-2009 nuclear tests to Mount Mantap within a 100-meter precision. Beyond locating nuclear tests, his team documented the structural collapse of Mount Mantap after North Korea's September 2017 nuclear test, and formulated frameworks capable of detecting low-yield nuclear tests and detected a mini-nuclear test conducted by North Korea on May 12, 2010.

== High-profile Earth's Inner Core Debate ==
For two decades, Wen challenged the prevailing paradigm of inner core supper-rotation. Wen resolved the debate by demonstrating that seismic changes do not reflect an independently spinning solid inner core, but rather localized activities at the inner core surface, including melting-solidification and surface deformation. His findings fundamentally transformed our understanding of inner core processes, shifting from global differential rotation to active surface processes.

== Leadership in National Initiatives ==
=== The China Seismological Reference Model project ===
In 2016, Wen initiated and led a nationwide project funded by the National Natural Science Foundation of China to develop the China Seismological Reference Model (CSRM). The effort culminated a foundational reference model CSRM-1.0 for China seismological research, a discovery of three stages of evolution of the Tibetan Plateau, and an open-access cyberinfrastructure for archiving and sharing seismic data for future research.

=== Grand Challenges on Earthquake Hazard Mitigation in China ===
Wen was the lead authors of a designated report entitled "Grand Challenges on Earthquake Hazard Mitigation in China" to the Chinese Academy of Sciences, the China Earthquake Administration, and the National Natural Science Foundation of China in 2011. The report identified seven grand challenges and proposed two major projects of building a national infrastructure for seismic observations and an educational outreach project for seismology in earthquake hazard mitigation in China.
