= J. Taylor Perron =

Geomorphologist and 2021 MacArthur fellow

Taylor Perron (born c. 1977) is a geomorphologist and Professor at MIT. He was a 2021 MacArthur fellow.

== Education and work ==
Perron obtained an AB in Earth and Planetary Sciences and Archaeology at Harvard University and a PhD in Earth and Planetary Science from University of California, Berkeley. Perron was a postdoc at Harvard University.

Perron is the Cecil and Ida Green Professor of Earth, Atmospheric, and Planetary Sciences at the Massachusetts Institute of Technology.

Perron researched Amazonian Dark earth.

Perron was named a 2021 MacArthur fellow for studying landscapes evolution and developing tools for predictions involving climate change.

== Personal life ==
Taylor is married to psychotherapist Lisa Varchol Perron. Together they wrote a picture book, All the Rocks We Love.
