= Jerry Goldstein (physicist) =

American physicist

Jerry Goldstein (born 23 December 1970) is a space physicist whose research has focused on the Earth's plasmasphere, a high-altitude extension of the ionized portion of the planet's upper atmosphere. During the years 2002–2005 he published a series of papers (thirteen first-authored, seventeen co-authored) on the density structure and global dynamics of the plasmasphere.

In addition to covering fundamental scientific aspects of plasmaspheric dynamics, Goldstein's research has brought attention to plasmaspheric influence on space weather, i.e., space-based phenomena that affect human activities and society. For example, when so-called "space storms" (otherwise known as geomagnetic storms) strike, they erode away the outer layers of the plasmasphere, and this erosion produces significant space weather effects in the form of increased radiation hazards for satellites and astronauts, and range errors in GPS navigation signals.

Goldstein got his B.S. at Brooklyn College and his Ph.D at Dartmouth College, where he studied magnetospheric cavity mode resonance, a phenomenon in which the Earth's magnetic field traps electromagnetic waves. As a postdoc at Rice University (2000–2003), Goldstein’s job was to interpret and model the brand-new space weather data being obtained by the IMAGE satellite (launched in March 2000). During his stay at Rice, he also participated in public outreach and education, working with inner city high school algebra teachers to develop space physics problems for use in the classroom, and designing and teaching an eight-week Continuing Studies course in space physics.

At the Southwest Research Institute (after 2003), Goldstein continued his research on the inner magnetosphere of Earth. He also participated in analysis of Cassini data being returned from Saturn’s magnetosphere, taught graduate-level courses as an adjoint professor of U.T. San Antonio, and led the science operations center for the TWINS.

In 2006, Goldstein received several notes of recognition for his research. He was awarded the 2006 American Geophysical Union (AGU) Macelwane medal and granted the status of AGU Fellow. In 2006, Popular Science magazine named Goldstein one of its annual "Brilliant 10" young scientists, and San Antonio Business Journal included Goldstein in its "Forty Under 40."
