= Natalya Gomez =

Canadian cryosphere researcher

- Known for: Research on the Cryopshere - melting sheet ice, rising sea levels
- Awards: AGU Cryosphere Early Career Award
- Scientific career
- Institutions: Professor at McGill University
- Website: http://www.natalyagomez.com

Natalya Gomez is a professor, researcher, cryosphere and sea level expert whose research primarily centers around the interactions between ice sheets, sea level, and earth in the past, present and future. Gomez is a professor at McGill University, a Canada Research Chair in Geodynamics of Ice sheet - Sea level interactions, and received the AGU Cryosphere Early Career Award in 2019.

== Academics and career ==
Gomez received her bachelor's degree in Physics, with a math minor (2006), and her master's degree in Geophysics and Environmental Studies (2009) at the University of Toronto. Gomez earned her PhD at Harvard University in the Department of Earth and Planetary Sciences. Her thesis was on sea level and ice sheet interactions, advised by Professor Jerry X. Mitrovica. Gomez's post doctoral work was done at the Courant Institute of Mathematical Science at New York University. She is currently a professor in the Earth & Planetary Sciences Department at McGill University & the Canada Research Chair in the Geodynamics of Ice Sheet - Sea Level interactions.

Much of Gomez's work focuses on creating a better understanding what the future climate will look like based on both the past and current actions/patterns. Her research examines how the continual emission of greenhouse gases will affect our atmosphere and temperature, specifically rising sea levels due to melting ice sheets near the Northern and Southern poles. For a list of Natalya Gomez's publications: see her Google Scholar profile

Gomez's work draws on climate science, glaciology and global geophysics and aims to model and understand records of the Earth's response to past and ongoing climate change and improve predictions of future sea level rise as the climate warms. She is credited with identifying the importance of the stabilizing feedback of gravitationally self-consistent sea-level changes onto the stability and dynamics of marine ice sheets, and she has also explored the role of the rheology of the solid Earth on ice sheet and sea level evolution.

Gomez is a member of the steering committee of the World Climate Research Programme on Regional Sea-level Change & Coastal Impacts.

== Awards and grants ==
- Cryosphere Early Career Award from the American Geophysical Union (AGU) in 2019, "given annually to one researcher within 10 years of completing their PhD for outstanding contributions to cryospheric science and technology"
- Nominated vice-chair of the International Association of Geodesy (IAG)'s subsection on Cryospheric Deformation, 2019
- Elected Fellow of the American Geophysical Union, 2023
