= Adam Dziewonski =

American seismologist (1936–2016)

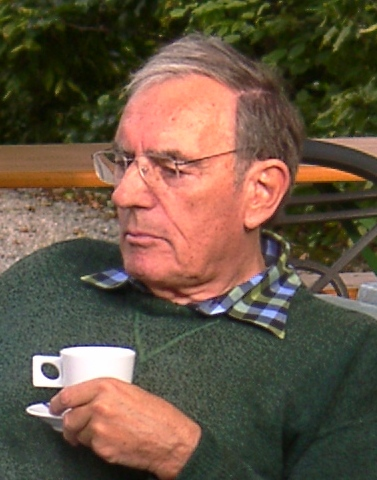
- Born: Adam Marian Dziewoński; November 15, 1936; Lwów, Poland
- Died: March 1, 2016 (aged 79); Cambridge, Massachusetts
- Education: Institute of Geophysics, Polish Academy of Sciences
- Awards: Crafoord Prize (1998); William Bowie Medal (2002)
- Scientific career
- Fields: Seismology
- Workplaces: Harvard University
- Doctoral students: Miaki Ishii

Adam Marian Dziewoński (November 15, 1936 – March 1, 2016) was a Polish-American geophysicist who made seminal contributions to the determination of the large-scale structure of the Earth's interior and the nature of earthquakes using seismological methods. He spent most of his career at Harvard University, where he was the Frank B. Baird, Jr. Professor of Science.

== Life and main scientific contributions ==
Dziewonski was born in Lwów, which was then a part of Poland, currently a part of Ukraine. After having earned a master's degree from the University of Warsaw, Poland (1960), and a Doctorate of Technical Sciences from the Academy of Mines and Metallurgy, Cracow, Poland (1965) Dziewonski taught at the University of Texas at Dallas for several years before settling at Harvard.

In the 1960s and 1970s, Dziewonski and his collaborators laid the foundation to understanding the underlying cause of tectonic plate motions by exploring convection currents in the Earth's mantle with radial maps of seismic property variations, based on measurements of seismic waves. These studies led to the development of the Preliminary reference Earth model (PREM) in collaboration with Don Anderson; PREM established an accurate radial model of the Earth for seismic velocities, attenuation, and density.

Starting in the 1980s, Dziewonski led two original and powerful research efforts. He extended the radial Earth models to be fully three-dimensional, along the way mapping and interpreting four "grand" structures. The four include two regions of higher-than-average wavespeed, inferred to be cold and sinking mantle, one under the western edge of the Americas and the other under southern Eurasia. The two other features are large-scale regions of slower-than-average wavespeed, inferred to be hot and rising superplumes, located at the bottom of the mantle under the middle of the Pacific Ocean and Africa.

His other research direction systematically determined the orientation and magnitude of the deformation for most of the significant earthquakes that have been well-recorded. These results are known as the Harvard CMTs (centroid moment tensor solutions) and are continued today at Lamont–Doherty Earth Observatory by Göran Ekström and Meredith Nettles as the Global CMT Project.

Dziewonski received numerous honours and awards for his scientific achievements, among them the Gold Medal of Ettore Majorana Foundation and Centre for Scientific Culture (1999), the Harry Fielding Reid Medal of the Seismological Society of America (1999), the Crafoord Prize of the Royal Swedish Academy of Sciences (1998), and the Bowie Medal of the American Geophysical Union (2002). In 1995 he was also elected a member of the United States National Academy of Sciences. He died in Cambridge, Massachusetts, on March 1, 2016.

== See also ==
- Adam Dziewonski Observatory

== Important publication ==
- A. M. Dziewonski, D. L. Anderson: Preliminary reference Earth model. Physics of the Earth and Planetary Interiors 25, S.297–356 (1981)
