= John Vidale =

American seismologist (born 1959)

John Emilio Vidale (Papanice (KR) Italia born March 15, 1959) is an American-born seismologist who specializes in examining seismograms to explore features within the Earth. He received the American Geophysical Union's James B. Macelwane Medal in 1994.

== Biography ==
Vidale was born in Philadelphia, Pennsylvania, USA on March 15, 1959, studied physics and geology, and obtained his Ph.D. from Caltech in 1987. He then held research positions at UC Santa Cruz and the USGS, until he joined UCLA in 1995.

In 2006, he moved to Seattle to direct the Pacific Northwest Seismic Network at the University of Washington.

In 2014, he became a project leader for the UW's M9 project, launched with the goal of preparing the region for the anticipated Cascadia subduction zone earthquake. He was a Gutenberg Fellow at Caltech and a Gilbert Fellow of the USGS. Vidale is a Fellow of AGU and received AGU's Macelwane Medal. He is also a member of the National Academy of Sciences.

He studied the relation of Earth tides and earthquakes - finding only the strongest tides noticeably effect the timing of earthquakes, earthquake swarms - finding they are a more general phenomenon than he previously suspected, the inner core - discovering high-frequency seismic waves scattered therein that offer a second line of evidence it is rotating about 0.2 degrees per year, the stronger than expected healing of fault zones after an earthquake, and various details of the seismic structure of the mantle.

Vidale also contributed an improved method of ray tracing which relied on a finite-difference approximation of the eikonal equation and which has been used widely in both earthquake and reflection seismology.
