= Megan Konar =

American civil engineer

- Education: Princeton University
- Known for: Research in Water Resources Engineering and Science
- Scientific career
- Fields: Civil and Environmental Engineering
- Workplaces: University of Illinois Urbana-Champaign

Megan Konar is a scientist and Associate Professor of Civil and Environmental Engineering at the University of Illinois at Urbana-Champaign. Konar’s research focuses on the intersection of food, water, and trade. She studies the connection between hydrology, environmental science, and economics.

== Early life and education ==
Megan Konar grew up in Illinois. She developed an interest in nature and the outdoors as a kid hiking with her parents. Growing up near Lake Michigan during the Great Chicago Flood of 1992 made a big impression on her, sparking her fascination with water resources.

Konar received her Bachelors of Science from the University of California at Berkeley in Conservation and Resource Studies in 2002. She then went on to get her Masters of Science at the University of Oxford in Water Science, Policy, and Management in 2005. Afterwards, she completed both her Masters of Science (2009) and Ph.D. (2012) in Environmental Engineering at Princeton University.

== Career and research ==
Konar is an Associate Professor of Civil and Environmental Engineering at the University of Illinois at Urbana-Champaign. She has worked for the University of Illinois at Urbana-Champaign since 2013. There, she teaches Water Resources Engineering and Globalization of Water.

In 2014, Konar was a visiting expert for the Institute of Government and Public Affairs at the University of Illinois at Urbana-Champaign where she used her research to inform public policy. Her work is deliberately interdisciplinary, as she focuses on not only the science of water but how that connects to food sources and trade, topics which are important in creating policy.

One article of which she is the primary author is Water for food: The global virtual water trade network. The article discusses virtual water trade, displaying a network map of the global virtual water trade network which represents trade patterns between over a hundred countries and includes the weight of each of those links. The authors confirmed speculations about the trade relationships between certain countries. The analysis determined which countries have the highest water footprint in regards to trade and explained why that is indicative of the country's number of trading partners. This data and analysis contribute important facts to water resource professionals and inform public policy on a global scale.

In 2017, Konar co-authored an article called Impacts of crop insurance on water withdrawals for irrigation with Tatyana Deryugina, a professor in the Department of Finance at the University of Illinois at Urbana-Champaign. The article concluded that the national crop insurance program is resulting in an increased use of water in agriculture, effectively overexploiting groundwater resources. The study found that a 1 per cent increase in insured acres results in a 0.223 per cent increase in water usage from irrigation. The study highlights the importance of groundwater reserves which will be essential to food security in a changing climate.

Konar received the 2022 Dean's Award for Excellence in Research from the Grainger College of Engineering at the University of Illinois at Urbana-Champaign.
