= William R. Young (oceanographer) =

Australian-American oceanographer

William Roy Young
- Born: 21 November 1955 (age 70); Brisbane, Australia
- Education: Australian National University; Massachusetts Institute of Technology; Woods Hole Oceanographic Institution
- Scientific career
- Fields: Fluid dynamics Oceanography
- Workplaces: Scripps Institution of Oceanography; Massachusetts Institute of Technology
- Thesis: The vertical structure of the wind-driven circulation (1981)
- Doctoral advisor: Peter B. Rhines

William Roy Young (also referred to as Bill Young) is an Australian-American oceanographer and a professor at the Scripps Institution of Oceanography at the University of California San Diego.

== Education and career ==
William Young graduated from Australian National University with a bachelor's degree in theoretical physics in 1977 and a master's degree in applied mathematics in 1978. He completed his Phd in 1981 under the supervision of Peter B. Rhines that was awarded by a joint PhD program offered by Massachusetts Institute of Technology and Woods Hole Oceanographic Institution. He then worked as a postdoctoral researcher at the Scripps Institution of Oceanography from 1981 to 1984.

He joined the faculty of Massachusetts Institute of Technology in 1985 and worked there till 1987. He returned to the Scripps Institution of Oceanography in 1988 where he still remains.

== Awards and honours ==
He was elected as a fellow of American Geophysical Union in 1989, of American Meteorological Society in 2008 and of the National Academy of Sciences in 2012.
