= Maureen D. Long =

American observational seismologist

Maureen Long
- Occupation: Professor/researcher

Academic background
- Education: Rensselaer Polytechnic Institute (BS); Massachusetts Institute of Technology (Ph.D)

Academic work
- Discipline: Geology and geophysics

Maureen D. Long is an observational seismologist studying mantle and Mesosphere dynamics. She currently serves as a professor at Yale University within the Department of Geology and Geophysics.

== Early life and education ==
Long began her love of science in the eight grade while enrolled in an Earth science course, giving her an initial look into plate tectonics. She continued her education at Rensselaer Polytechnic Institute (RPI) in Troy, New York, receiving her bachelor's degree in 2000, graduating summa cum laude. In June 2006, Long earned her doctorate in geophysics from the Massachusetts Institute of Technology. Her thesis was on anisotropy and deformation of the Earth's mantle.

== Career and research ==
Long began her research within environmental science while still a student at RPI, serving as an undergraduate research assistant from 1998 to 2000. After that, she was a graduate research and teaching assistant at the Massachusetts Institute of Technology (2000-2006). She then became a postdoctoral associate before becoming a visiting investigator within the Department of Terrestrial Magnetism (DTM) at the Carnegie Institution for Science. She spent three years there while transitioning back into education as a professor within the Department of Geology and Geophysics at Yale University. Long continues to teach at Yale University while at the same time maintaining a strong continuation of personal research.

Long's focuses of research include observational seismology and mantle dynamics; imaging of seismic anisotropy, subduction zone dynamics and processes; subduction and the mantle flow field, structure and dynamics of the lowermost mantle and the core-mantle boundary region, and structure, evolution, and deformation of the continental lithosphere.

== Awards and recognition ==
- 2000, Joseph L. Rosenholtz Prize for outstanding work in earth sciences, RPI
- 2000-2003, NSF Graduate Research Fellowship
- 2003, MIT Outstanding Student Paper Award, Seismology Section, AGU Fall Meeting
- 2004, Award for Excellence in Teaching, EAPS Department
- 2007-2008, Carnegie Postdoctoral Fellowship, DTM, Carnegie
- 2010, Editors’ Citation for Excellence in Refereeing, JGR Solid Earth
- 2011-2013, Alfred P. Sloan Research Fellowship (Physics)
- 2012, Outstanding Reviewer, Geophysical Journal International
- 2012 NSF Faculty Early Career Development (CAREER) Award
- 2015, Kavli Frontiers of Science Fellow, National Academy of Sciences
- 2016-2017, EarthScope Distinguished Speaker
- 2016, Fellow, American Geophysical Union
- 2016, James B. Macelwane Medal, American Geophysical Union (AGU)

== Selected publications ==
- Long, M. D.; Silver, P. G. (2008). "The Subduction Zone Flow Field from Seismic Anisotropy: A Global View". Science. 319 (5861): 315–318. Bibcode:2008Sci...319..315L. doi:10.1126/science.1150809. PMID 18202286. S2CID 16922543.
- Long, Maureen D.; Becker, Thorsten W. (2010). "Mantle dynamics and seismic anisotropy". Earth and Planetary Science Letters. 297 (3–4): 341–354. Bibcode:2010E&PSL.297..341L. doi:10.1016/j.epsl.2010.06.036.
- McCaffrey, Robert; Long, Maureen D.; Goldfinger, Chris; Zwick, Peter C.; Nabelek, John L.; Johnson, Cheryl K.; Smith, Curt (2000). "Rotation and plate locking at the Southern Cascadia Subduction Zone". Geophysical Research Letters. 27 (19): 3117–3120. Bibcode:2000GeoRL..27.3117M. doi:10.1029/2000GL011768.
