= Anna Trugman =

American geoscientist

Anna Taylor Trugman
- Education: Princeton University
- Scientific career
- Thesis: Understanding the roles of climate, disturbance, and functional diversity in the terrestrial carbon cycle : linking mechanisms from regional to global scales (2017)

Anna Trugman is an associate professor at the University of California, Santa Barbara who is known for her work modeling the consumption of carbon dioxide by terrestrial ecosystems. She was elected a fellow of the American Geophysical Union in 2025.

== Education and career ==
Trugman grew up in New Mexico and was an intern at Los Alamos National Laboratory while still in high school. She received her a B.S. from Stanford University in 2011. She earned her Ph.D. from Princeton University. Following her Ph.D. she moved to the University of Utah where she was a postdoctoral investigator. She moved to the University of California, Santa Barbara in 2019.

== Research ==
Trugman is known for her work using models to predict the amount of carbon dioxide different ecoystems can absorb. Her early research examined the role of soil moisture on global carbon models. She has also examined the impact of drought on trees and how models predict the impact of drought on trees.

== Awards and honors ==
Trugman received the Tansley Medal from the New Phytologist in 2021. In 2022 she was named an Early Career Fellow by the Ecological Society of America. In 2025 the American Geophysical Union awarded her the James B. Macelwane Medal and elected her as fellow.

== Selected publications ==
- Trugman, A. T.; Detto, M.; Bartlett, M. K.; Medvigy, D.; Anderegg, W. R. L.; Schwalm, C.; Schaffer, B.; Pacala, S. W. (2018). Cameron, Duncan (ed.). "Tree carbon allocation explains forest drought‐kill and recovery patterns". Ecology Letters. 21 (10): 1552–1560. doi:10.1111/ele.13136. ISSN 1461-023X.
- Trugman, A. T.; Medvigy, D.; Mankin, J. S.; Anderegg, W. R. L. (2018-07-16). "Soil Moisture Stress as a Major Driver of Carbon Cycle Uncertainty". Geophysical Research Letters. 45 (13): 6495–6503. doi:10.1029/2018GL078131. ISSN 0094-8276.
- Anderegg, William R. L.; Trugman, Anna T.; Badgley, Grayson; Anderson, Christa M.; Bartuska, Ann; Ciais, Philippe; Cullenward, Danny; Field, Christopher B.; Freeman, Jeremy; Goetz, Scott J.; Hicke, Jeffrey A.; Huntzinger, Deborah; Jackson, Robert B.; Nickerson, John; Pacala, Stephen (2020-06-19). "Climate-driven risks to the climate mitigation potential of forests". Science. 368 (6497). doi:10.1126/science.aaz7005. ISSN 0036-8075.
- Trugman, Anna T.; Anderegg, Leander D.L.; Anderegg, William R.L.; Das, Adrian J.; Stephenson, Nathan L. (2021). "Why is Tree Drought Mortality so Hard to Predict?". Trends in Ecology & Evolution. 36 (6): 520–532. doi:10.1016/j.tree.2021.02.001. ISSN 0169-5347.
