= Travel-time curve =

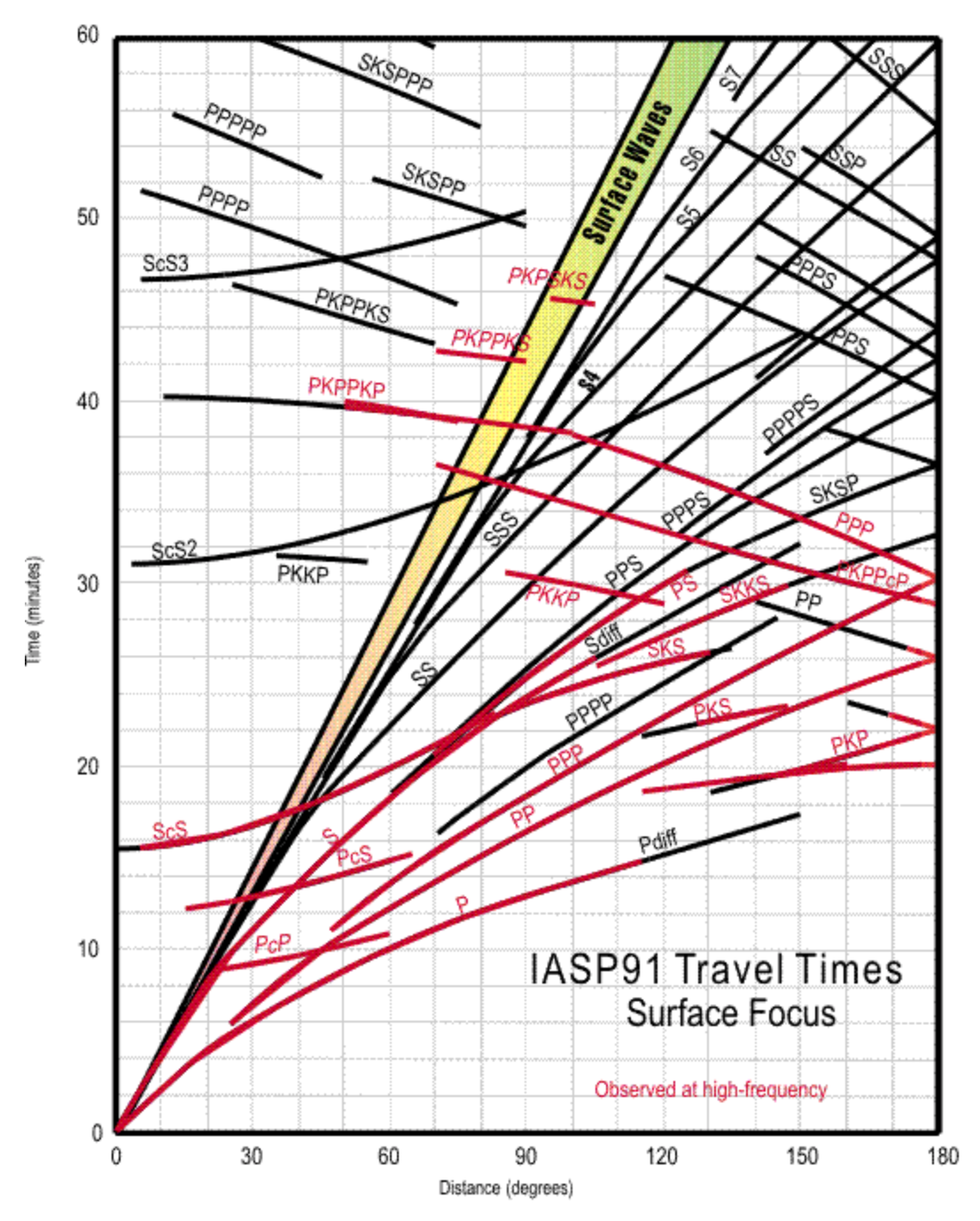
Time-distance curve

Travel time in seismology means time for the seismic waves to travel from the focus of an earthquake through the crust to a certain seismograph station. Travel-time curve is a graph showing the relationship between the distance from the epicenter to the observation point and the travel time. Travel-time curve is drawn when the vertical axis of the graph is the travel time and the horizontal axis is the epicenter distance of each observation point.

By examining the travel-time curve, it is possible to know the seismic wave velocity and the depth of the epicenter and so on. It also provides clues to study the layered structure inside the earth. For example, by examining the travel-time curve of a teleseism, it can be seen that the earth consists of the crust, mantle, outer core, and inner core.

Travel-time curve also shows the relationship that the surface wave arrives first at the point near the epicenter, and conversely the refracted wave arrives first at the point far from the epicenter.

Seismic body waves (P- and S-waves) do not usually travel at a constant speed, as their speeds typically increase with depth in the Earth. The further the waves travel from the earthquake, the deeper they must go through the Earth. This results in the travel-time curves bending downward, indicating they take less time to travel a given distance. Surface waves (Love and Rayleigh waves are confined to the uppermost crust, so their speeds do not change with distance.

The body wave speeds tend to change smoothly with depth, but at certain depths they experience an abrupt change, known as a seismic discontinuity. One example of this is when the waves pass from the crust into the mantle, where the wave speeds suddenly increase ~1 km/s, causing a change in the curvature of the travel-time curves. This particular discontinuity is known as the Mohorovic discontinuity, aka the Moho, discovered by Croatian seismologist Andrija Mohorovičić in 1909 when he examined distinct sets of P- and S-waves generated by an earthquake in Zagreb. He realized that this could only be due to waves traveling at different speeds due to a sudden change in density with depth.

== See also ==
- Seismic wave
- Mohorovic discontinuity
