= Eric Davidson =

Eric Davidson may refer to:

- Eric H. Davidson (1937–2015), American biologist
- Eric Davidson (survivor) (1915–2009), one of the last survivors of the Halifax Explosion
- Eric A. Davidson, American geophysicist

== See also ==
- Erica Davidson (disambiguation)
