= Earth Interactions =

- Discipline: Geosciences
- Language: English
- Edited by: Sonali McDermid

Publication details
- History: 1996–present
- Publisher: American Meteorological Society, American Geophysical Union, and Association of American Geographers (United States)
- Open access: Yes
- Impact factor: 2.769 (2020)

Standard abbreviations
- ISO 4: Earth Interact.

Indexing
- CODEN: EINTFP
- ISSN: 1087-3562

Links
- Journal homepage; Online access; Online archive

Earth Interactions (EI) is a peer-reviewed scientific journal published by the American Meteorological Society, American Geophysical Union, and Association of American Geographers. EI publishes research on the interactions among the atmosphere, hydrosphere, biosphere, cryosphere, and lithosphere, including, but not limited to, research on human impacts, such as land cover change, irrigation, dams/reservoirs, urbanization, pollution, and landslides.

== Abstracting and indexing ==
The journal is abstracted and indexed by Compendex, GEOBASE, GeoRef, Scopus, Current Contents, and EBSCO, and ProQuest databases.

== See also ==
- List of scientific journals in earth and atmospheric sciences
