= Brandon Jones =

Brandon Jones is the name of:

- Brandon Jones (actor) (born 1988), American actor
- Brandon Jones (politician) (born 1977), Representative of Mississippi's 111th District
- Brandon Jones (singer) (born 1989), Canadian singer/songwriter, 2006 Canadian Idol competitor
- Brandon Astor Jones (1943–2016), American convicted murderer
- Brandon Scott Jones (born 1984), American actor, comedian, and writer
- Brandon Jones, co-founder of GameTrailers

== Sportspeople ==
- Brandon Jones (athlete) (born 1987), Belizean-American track and field athlete
- Brandon Jones (baseball) (born 1983), American baseball player
- Brandon Jones (wide receiver) (born 1982), American football wide receiver
- Brandon Jones (cornerback) (born 1989), American football cornerback
- Brandon Jones (safety) (born 1998), American football safety
- Brandon Jones (racing driver) (born 1997), American race car driver in NASCAR

== See also ==
- Brendan Jones (disambiguation)
- Brenden Jones (born 1974), American politician
- Michael Brandon Jones, American geophysicist
