= American Geophysical Union =

Nonprofit organization of geophysicists

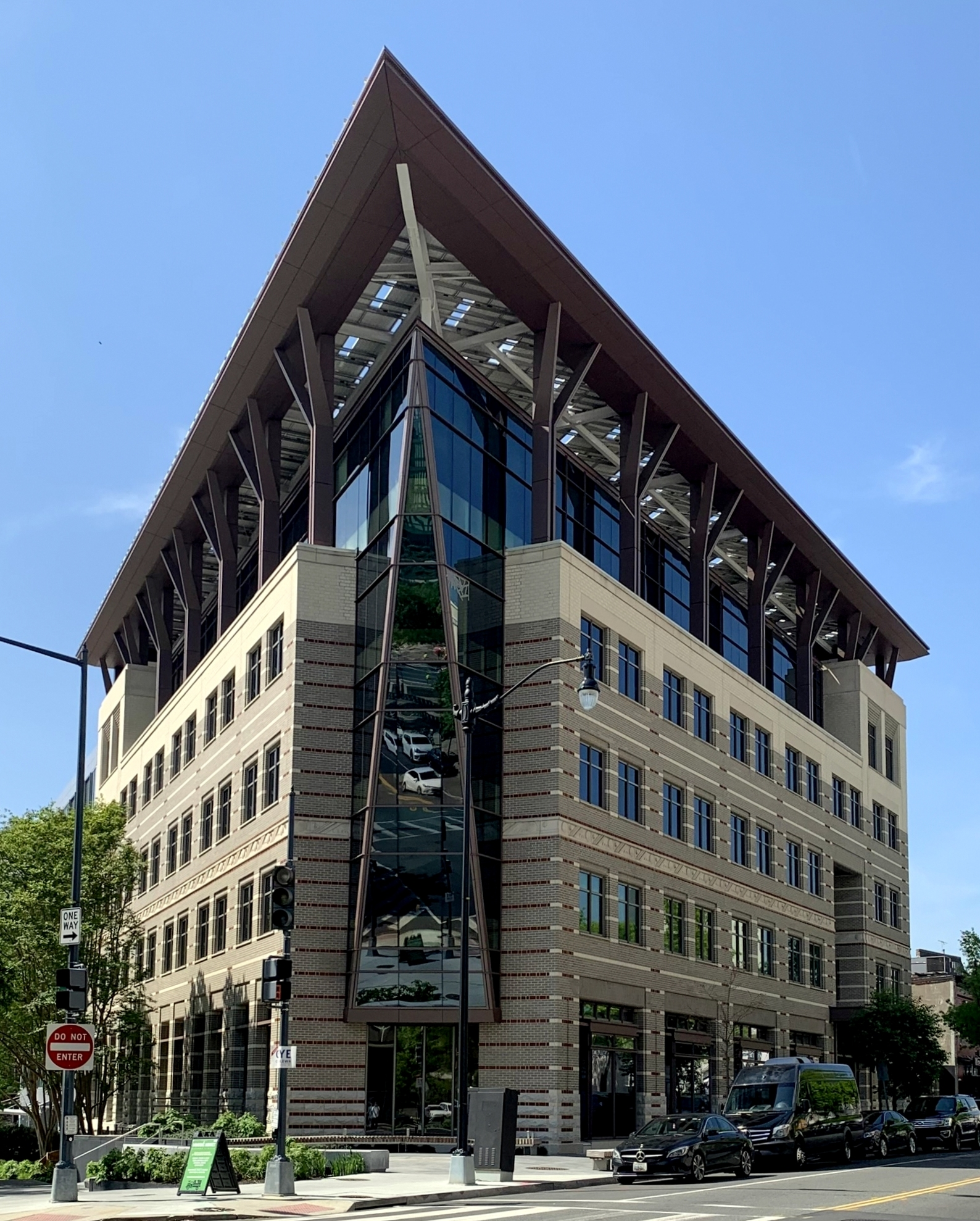
- American Geophysical Union Headquarters in 2022
- Abbreviation: AGU
- Formation: 1919; 107 years ago
- Type: Scientific society
- Tax ID no.: 52-0955532
- Legal status: 501(c)(3) non-profit
- Purpose: Geophysics, and many other fields in Earth and Space sciences
- Headquarters: Washington, D.C., United States
- Coordinates: 38°54′53″N 77°02′43″W
- Region served: Worldwide
- Members: 62,000 individuals
- President: Brandon Jones
- Executive Director, Chief Executive Officer: Janice Lachance
- Main organ: Eos, Transactions, American Geophysical Union
- Affiliations: International Union of Geodesy and Geophysics; American Association for the Advancement of Science; American Institute of Physics; National Academy of Sciences; American Geosciences Institute; Council of Engineering and Scientific Society Executives; International Council of Scientific Unions
- Revenue: $52,606,635 (2017)
- Expenses: $36,484,078 (2017)
- Endowment: $602,625
- Employees: 148 (2017)
- Volunteers: 21,000 (2017)
- Website: www.agu.org

The American Geophysical Union (AGU) is a 501(c)(3) nonprofit organization of Earth, atmospheric, ocean, hydrologic, space, and planetary scientists and enthusiasts that according to their website includes 130,000 people (not members). AGU's activities are focused on the organization and dissemination of scientific information in the interdisciplinary and international fields within the Earth and space sciences. The geophysical sciences involve four fundamental areas: atmospheric and ocean sciences; solid-Earth sciences; hydrologic sciences; and space sciences. The organization's headquarters is located on Florida Avenue in Washington, D.C.

== History ==
The AGU was established in December 1919 by the National Research Council (NRC) to represent the United States in the International Union of Geodesy and Geophysics (IUGG), and its first chairman was William Bowie of the United States Coast and Geodetic Survey (USCGS). For more than 50 years, it operated as an unincorporated affiliate of the National Academy of Sciences. On June 29, 1972, AGU was incorporated in the District of Columbia and membership was opened to scientists and students worldwide.

The AGU was intended to promote "pure" geophysics; exploration geophysics has its own society, the Society of Exploration Geophysicists. In a March 1919 report by a committee chaired by Robert S. Woodward of the Carnegie Institution, geophysics was defined as a collection of "borderlands" (closely related, mutually dependent subjects): astronomy, geodesy, geology, meteorology, oceanography, seismology, terrestrial magnetism, terrestrial electricity, tides, and volcanology. The AGU was organized under seven sections: Geodesy, Seismology, Meteorology, Terrestrial magnetism and electricity, Oceanography, Volcanology, and Geophysical chemistry. Hydrology was added in 1930 and Tectonophysics in 1940. In suggesting the latter name, Norman Bowen evoked a familiar theme: to "designate this new borderline field between geophysics, physics and geology for the solution of problems of tectonics."

The first meeting of the AGU took place on April 23, 1920. In attendance were 25 members. Up to 1930, the number of members was restricted and members were elected. In 1932 the first annual dues of US$2 were imposed. The membership grew to 4,600 in 1950; 13,000 in 1980; and 26,000 in 1990. As of 2018, it had 62,000 members from 137 countries.

== Publications ==
AGU publishes the online magazine Eos and more than twenty peer-reviewed scientific journals:

- AGU Advances
- Earth and Space Science
- Earth's Future
- Geochemistry, Geophysics, Geosystems
- GeoHealth
- Geophysical Research Letters
- Global Biogeochemical Cycles
- Journal of Advances in Modeling Earth Systems
- Journal of Geophysical Research – sections A (Space Physics), B (Solid Earth), C (Oceans), D (Atmospheres), E (Planets), F (Earth Surface), and G (Biogeosciences)
- Paleoceanography and Paleoclimatology
- Radio Science
- Reviews of Geophysics
- Space Weather
- Tectonics
- Water Resources Research

The journal Radio Science is co-sponsored by the International Union of Radio Science. The journal Earth Interactions is published in partnership with the American Meteorological Society (AMS) and the Association of American Geographers (AAG). In addition, International Journal of Geomagnetism and Aeronomy is no longer published and AGU distributes Chinese Journal of Geophysics and Nonlinear Processes in Geophysics. Many of the journals have high impact factors, with Paleoceanography having the highest within paleontology and Reviews of Geophysics the second highest within geochemistry and geophysics as of 2010. AGU has also been publishing books for more than 85 years.

AGU has also partnered with societies to publish:

- Chinese Journal of Geophysics, with the Chinese Academy of Sciences
- Earth and Planetary Physics, with the Chinese Geophysical Society
- Earth Interactions, with the American Meteorological Society
- Nonlinear Processes in Geophysics, with the European Geosciences Union
- Interpretation, with the Society of Exploration Geophysicists
- The Leading Edge, with the Society of Exploration Geophysicists

AGU co-published (along with the AMS and the AAG) its first electronic journal, Earth Interactions, in 1997. It started its own electronic journal, Geochemistry, Geophysics, Geosystems, in December 1999. It made a full transition to electronic publishing in 2001. For all its journals, the electronic version became the publication of record. This was accompanied by a new identification scheme for articles that entirely did away with sequential page numbers. Instead, each article had a digital object identifier (DOI). As an example, 10.1029/2001GL014304 consists of the publisher identifier (10.1029), the year (2001), the journal code (GL), and an article number (014304). This new system was met with complaints from libraries and scientists. The article numbers provided no clue for libraries to find an article in printed versions, and even scientific databases were not set up to handle DOIs. AGU officials claimed that the problems were a temporary cost of being a frontrunner, but did retroactively assign each article a four-digit article number.

In 2012 the journals and books, including over one and a half million pages of legacy content, were transferred to the Wiley Online Library. John Wiley & Sons were recognized for this work with the IT Project Team of the Year Award at the UK IT Industry Awards for 2013.

Five AGU journals are open access only: AGU Advances, Earth's Future, Earth and Space Science, GeoHealth, JAMES, and Space Weather. The remainder are delayed open access journals, having free access after a two-year rolling period.

The AGU hosts a number of blogs, collectively known as the AGU Blogosphere, informally publishing frequent updates on the Earth and space sciences.

=== Texaco copyright case ===
AGU publications are copyrighted, but in the United States many exceptions to the exclusive rights of copyright are allowed under the fair use provision, part of the Copyright Act of 1976. Making copies of publications are allowed for such uses as teaching and research as long as a set of four criteria are met. However, when Texaco's corporate library made systematic copies of journal articles for its collection, AGU and five other publishers took Texaco to court. The judges found for AGU. Texaco was fined and agreed to retroactively purchase a license from the Copyright Clearance Center.

== Executive ==
=== Presidents ===
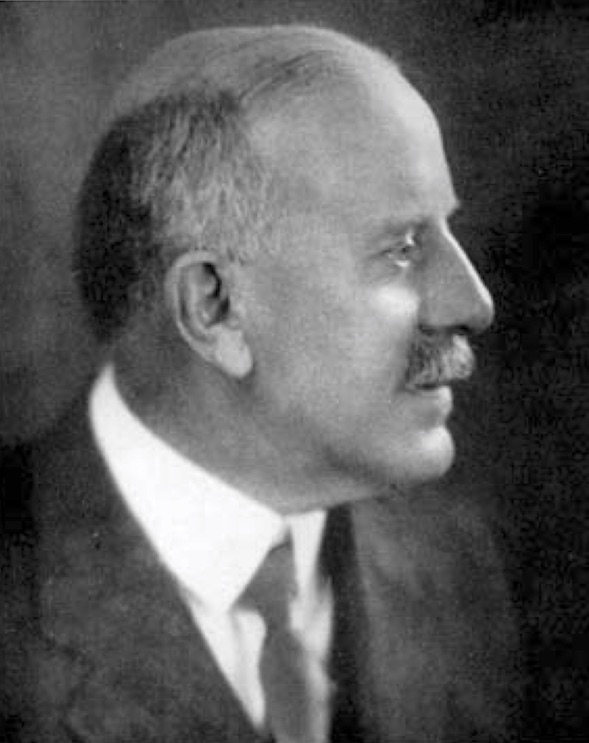
William Bowie, first chairman of the AGU

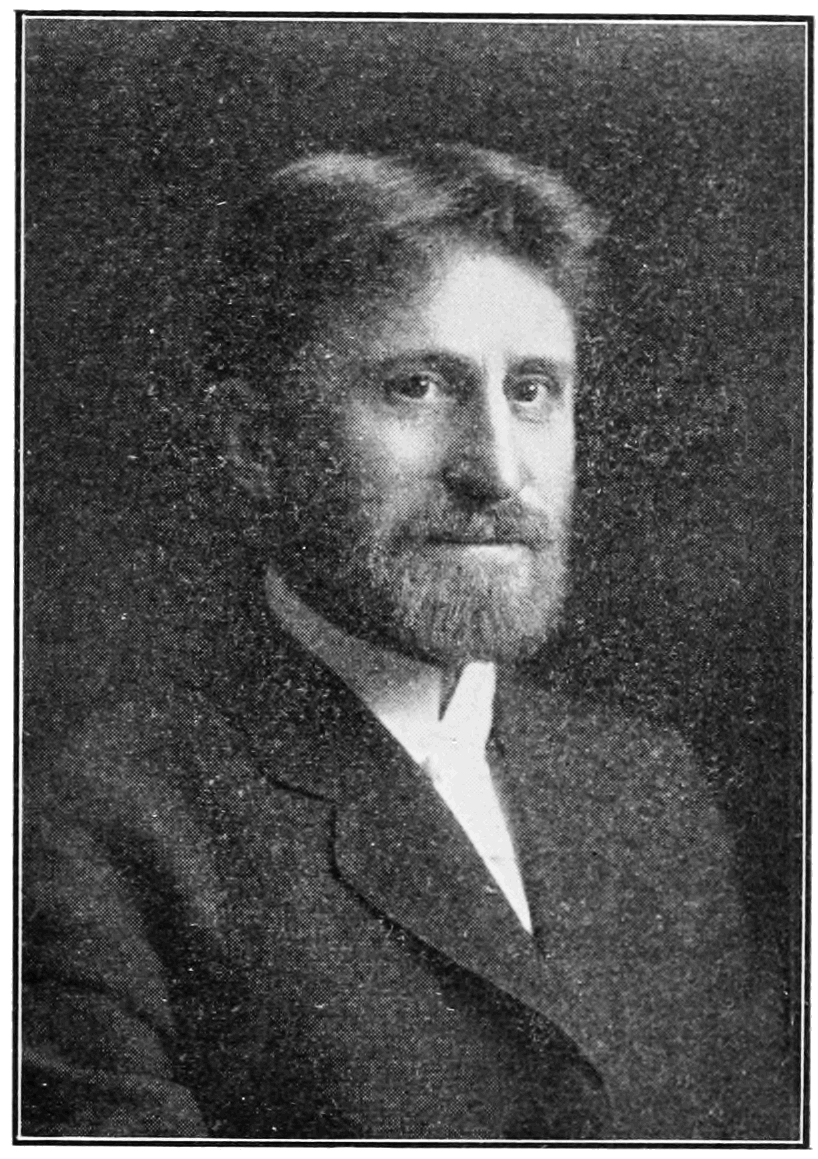
Louis Agricola Bauer

The presidents of the AGU have been:

- William Bowie (1920–1922)
- Louis Agricola Bauer (1922–1924)
- Harry Fielding Reid (1924–1926)
- Henry S. Washington (1926–1928)
- William Bowie (1929–1932)
- William Jackson Humphreys (1932–1935)
- Nicholas H. Heck (1935–1938)
- Richard M. Field (1938–1941)
- Walter C. Lowdermilk (1941–1944)
- Leason H. Adams (1944–1947)
- Oscar Edward Meinzer (1947–1948)
- Walter Hermann Bucher (1948–1953)
- James B. Macelwane (1953–1956)
- Maurice Ewing (1956–1959)
- Lloyd V. Berkner (1959–1961)
- Thomas F. Malone (1961–1964)
- George P. Woollard (1964–1966)
- William C. Ackermann (1966–1968)
- Helmut Landsberg (1968–1970)
- Homer E. Newell, Jr. (1970–1972)
- Philip H. Abelson (1972–1974)
- Frank Press (1974–1976)
- Arthur E. Maxwell (1976–1978)
- Allan V. Cox (1978–1980)
- John T. Wilson (1980–1982)
- James Van Allen (1982–1984)
- Charles L. Drake (1984–1986)
- Peter S. Eagleson (1986–1988)
- Don L. Anderson (1988–1990)
- Brent Dalrymple (1990–1992)
- Ralph J. Cicerone (1992–1994)
- Marcia Neugebauer (1994–1996)
- Sean Solomon (1996–1998)
- John A. Knauss (1998–2000)
- Marcia McNutt (2000–2002)
- Robert E. Dickinson (2002–2004)
- John Orcutt (2004–2006)
- Tim Killeen (2006–2008)
- Tim Grove (2008–2010)
- Michael McPhaden (2010–2013)
- Carol Finn (2013–2014)
- Margaret Leinen (2015–2017)
- Eric A. Davidson (2017–2019)
- Robin Bell (2019–2021)
- Susan Lozier (2021–2023)
- Lisa Graumlich (2023–2025)
- Michael Brandon Jones (2025–)

=== Executive directors ===
While more than 40 presidents have provided scientific leadership for the AGU since 1919, operational leadership has been provided by a larger team. The first senior team member was John Adam Fleming, who was elected Secretary in 1925 and changed the name of his position to General Secretary. He served as a volunteer while working at the Department of Terrestrial Magnetism at the Carnegie Institution. By 1943, with the membership nearing 2,000, AGU recognized the need for a full-time professional administrator. The post was renamed Executive Secretary and Waldo E. Smith was hired. He served until 1970 and then Athelstan Spilhaus, Jr. was hired as executive director. Christine McEntee replaced him in 2010. Medals have been named after Fleming and Smith. The AGU leadership in 2021 included, in addition to the president, a CEO, 4 executive vice presidents, 6 vice presidents, 7 directors, and a chief digital officer.

== Recognition ==
The AGU offers several awards, medals and fellowships.

=== Awards ===
- The Africa Award for Research Excellence in Earth or Ocean Sciences (established 2015), awarded annually to an early career scientist from the continent of Africa, "for completing significant work that shows the focus and promise of making outstanding contributions to research in Earth or ocean sciences."
- The Africa Award for Research Excellence in Space Science (established 2015), awarded annually to an early career scientist from the continent of Africa, "for completing significant work that shows the focus and promise of making outstanding contributions to research in space science."
- The Ambassador Award (established 2013), awarded annually to up to five honorees in recognition "for outstanding contributions to one or more of the following area(s): societal impact, service to the Earth and space community, scientific leadership, and promotion of talent/career pool." This is the only AGU award whose recipients are conferred AGU Fellows.
- The Athelstan Spilhaus Award (established 2006), named after Athelstan Frederick Spilhaus, Sr. who created the bathythermograph and also a long-running science cartoon, "for enhancement of the public understanding of Earth and space science."
- The Charles S. Falkenberg Award (established in 2002), named after Falkenberg, who applied data visualization and information technology to earth sciences, to an individual "scientist under 45 years of age who has contributed to the quality of life, economic opportunities, and stewardship of the planet through the use of Earth science information and to the public awareness of the importance of understanding our planet."
- The Pavel S. Molchanov Climate Communications Prize (established in 2011 and permanently endowed by Pavel S. Molchanov in 2023) is awarded "in recognition of the communication of climate science to promote scientific literacy, clarity of message, and efforts to foster respect and understanding of science-based values, particularly around climate change."
- The David Perlman Award (established 2000), named after the science editor of the San Francisco Chronicle, "for excellence in researching and reporting a news story that meets one or more of the following criteria: brings new information or concepts about AGU sciences to the public's attention, identifies and corrects misconceptions about AGU sciences, or makes AGU sciences accessible and interesting to general audiences, without sacrificing accuracy."
- The Edward A. Flinn III Award (established 1990), named after a leader of the NASA Geodynamics Program who directed efforts to detect motion of the Earth's crust using laser ranging, to an "individual who personifies the Union's motto 'unselfish cooperation in research' through their facilitating, coordinating, and implementing activities."
- The Excellence in Geophysical Education Award (established in 1995) "to acknowledge a sustained commitment to excellence in geophysical education by a team, individual, or group. To educators who have had a major impact on geophysical education at any level (kindergarten through postgraduate), who have been outstanding teachers and trainers for a number of years, or who have made a long-lasting, positive impact on geophysical education through professional service."
- The International Award (established 2007) "to recognize an individual scientist or a small team for making an outstanding contribution to furthering the Earth and space sciences and using science for the benefit of society in less favored nations."
- The Outstanding Student Presentation Award (OSPA), "are awarded to promote, recognize and reward undergraduate, Master's and PhD students for quality research in the geophysical sciences. Each year, Sections recruit judges to assess and score student oral and poster presentations at meetings. Typically the top 2–5% of presenters in each Section are awarded an OSPA."
- The Robert C. Cowen Award (established 1991), named after a long-time editor of The Christian Science Monitor, "for a journalist or a group that has made significant, lasting, and consistent contributions to accurate reporting or writing on the geophysical sciences for the general public."
- The Science for Solutions Award (established 2012) "for significant contributions in the application and use of Earth and space sciences to solve societal problems."
- The Walter Sullivan Award for Excellence in Science Journalism (established 2000), named after the renowned science writer of The New York Times, awarded annually for science feature writing.
- The William Kaula Award (established 2003), named after geophysicist and physical geodesist William M. Kaula, for "extraordinary dedication to, and exceptional efforts on behalf of, the Union's publications program." (Awarded on even-numbered years.)

=== Fellowships ===
AGU nominates members for fellowship in the society. According to the AGU website "To be elected a Fellow of AGU is a special tribute for those who have made exceptional scientific contributions to Earth and space sciences as valued by their peers and vetted by section and focus group committees." A maximum of 0.1% of the membership can be elected each year.

=== Medals ===
- The Charles A. Whitten Medal (established 1984), named after Charles A. Whitten, a former AGU General Secretary and geodesist, "for outstanding achievement in research on the form and dynamics of the Earth and planets."
- The Devendra Lal Memorial Medal (established 2016) was named after Devendra Lal. Lal had a founding role in developing the field in which cosmic rays produced isotopes on Earth and are used as tracers to investigate a wide range of Earth Science problems. The Medal is awarded "for outstanding Earth and/or space sciences research by a scientist belonging to and working in a developing country."
- The James B. Macelwane Medal (established 1961), named after James B. Macelwane, a former AGU president who was deeply interested in teaching young scientists, "to be awarded annually for significant contributions by outstanding young scientists." Recipients must be no more than 10 years past their highest degree.
- The Joanne Simpson Medal (established in 2017), named after Joanne Simpson, the first woman in the United States to receive a PhD in meteorology, "for significant contributions to the earth and space sciences by an outstanding mid-career scientist."
- The John Adam Fleming Medal (established 1960), named after John Adam Fleming, a major contributor to magnetic standards and measurements, "for original research and technical leadership in geomagnetism, atmospheric electricity, aeronomy, space physics, and related sciences."
- The Maurice Ewing Medal (established 1974 and co-sponsored by the United States Navy), named after Maurice Ewing, a major contributor to oceanography, "for significant original contributions to the scientific understanding of the processes in the ocean; for the advancement of oceanographic engineering, technology, and instrumentation; and for outstanding service to the marine sciences."
- The Harry H. Hess Medal (established 1984), named after Harry Hammond Hess, who made major contributions to the study of the oceanic lithosphere, "for outstanding achievements in research of the constitution and evolution of Earth and other planets."
- The Inge Lehmann Medal (established 1995), named after Inge Lehmann, the discoverer of the Earth's inner core, "for outstanding contributions to the understanding of the structure, composition, and dynamics of the Earth's mantle and core."
- The Robert E. Horton Medal (established 1974), named after Robert E. Horton, who provided many of the analytical concepts for understanding the hydrologic cycle "for outstanding contributions to hydrology."
- The Roger Revelle Medal (established 1991), named after Roger Revelle, an oceanographer notable for his contribution to the understanding of global change, "for outstanding contributions in atmospheric sciences, atmosphere-ocean coupling, atmosphere-land coupling, biogeochemical cycles, climate, or related aspects of the Earth system."
- The Waldo E. Smith Medal (established 1982), named after Waldo E. Smith, the first Executive Secretary of AGU, to recognize "individuals who have played unique leadership roles in such diverse areas as scientific associations, education, legislation, research, public understanding of science, management, and philanthropy, and whose accomplishments have greatly strengthened and helped advance the geophysical sciences."
- The Walter H. Bucher Medal (established 1966), named after Walter Hermann Bucher, a former AGU president and major contributor to crustal problems, "for original contributions to the basic knowledge of the crust and lithosphere."
- The William Bowie Medal is the highest AGU honor and is awarded at most annually for "outstanding contributions to fundamental geophysics and for unselfish cooperation in research"; its namesake was the first recipient in 1939.

== Sections ==
The AGU is divided into 25 sections that provide the main structure for managing volunteers, developing leaders and honoring scientists. These sections also reflect the breadth of science within Earth and space science: atmospheric and space electricity; atmospheric sciences; biogeosciences; cryosphere sciences; Earth and planetary surface processes; Earth and space science informatics; education; geodesy; geohealth; geomagnetism; paleomagnetism and electromagnetism; hydrology; mineral and rock physics; natural hazards; near surface geophysics; nonlinear geophysics; ocean sciences; paleoceanography; planetary sciences; seismology; societal impacts and policy sciences; space physics and aeronomy; study of the Earth's deep interior; tectonophysics; volcanology, geochemistry, and petrology.

== Meetings ==
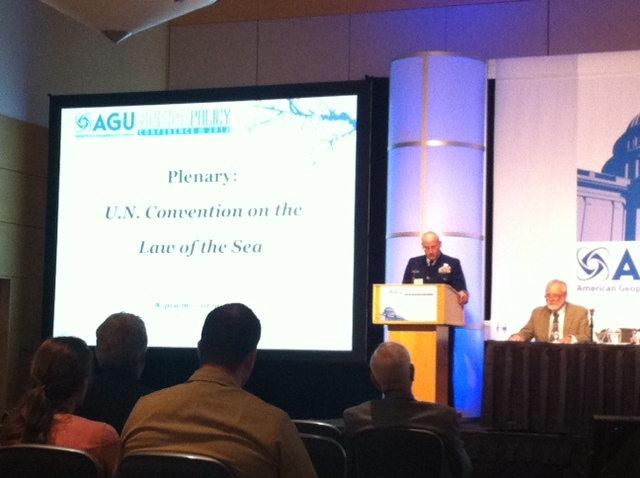
Plenary session at an American Geophysical Union policy conference in Washington, DC in May 2012

AGU holds an annual meeting every December (known as the Fall Meeting). Until 2017, the meeting was held yearly in San Francisco. Because of renovations at the San Francisco venue, the 2017 meeting took place in New Orleans and the 2018 meeting in Washington, DC. It returned to San Francisco in 2019 and its location will rotate among San Francisco, New Orleans, Chicago, and Washington, DC. Previously, a second meeting was held every Spring (April through May) in locations around the world. The latter grew out of AGU's annual Spring meeting, which had been held for many years in Baltimore, until declining interest caused AGU to move the meeting to different locations, starting with Boston in 1998. With the 2003 meeting in Nice, France, it became known as the Joint Assembly because AGU co-sponsors it with other societies such as the Geochemical Society, the Mineralogical Society of America (MSA), the Canadian Geophysical Union (CGU), and the European Geosciences Union (EGU). The Fall Meeting had more than 25,000 attendees in 2018.

In addition to the Fall meeting that covers all areas of the geophysical sciences, AGU sponsors many specialized meetings that are intended to serve the needs of particular scientific disciplines or geographical areas, including the Ocean Sciences Meeting, which is held in even numbered years. Small, highly focused meetings are offered through the Chapman Conferences.

The large numbers and international participation in the Fall Meeting results in a large contribution to greenhouse gases. The 9500 participants in the 2002 meeting traveled an average of 8,000 kilometres (5,000 mi) to attend, producing 1.3 metric tons of carbon dioxide, or one-sixteenth of the average yearly emissions for Americans. The AGU has made some adjustments such as asking shuttle bus drivers to turn off their engines when they are not moving, but 95% of the emissions come from jet fuel. In an unpublished study, David Scott and Lawrence Plug of Dalhousie University estimated that the AGU could reduce emissions by 7.7% if it moved the Fall Meeting to Denver, Colorado.

In 2017, the first joint JpGU-AGU meeting was held in Chiba, Japan. The meeting was a joint effort between AGU and the Japan Geoscience Union.

== Science and society ==
On occasion the AGU Council issues position statements on matters affecting public policy that are related to geophysics. These include biological evolution, natural hazards, science education and funding, and climate change. The AGU adopted its first position statement on climate change in December 1998. That statement began

Atmospheric concentrations of carbon dioxide and other greenhouse gases have substantially increased as a consequence of fossil fuel combustion and other human activities. These elevated concentrations of greenhouse gases are predicted to persist in the atmosphere for times ranging to thousands of years. Increasing concentrations of carbon dioxide and other greenhouse gases affect the Earth-atmosphere energy balance, enhancing the natural greenhouse effect and thereby exerting a warming influence at the Earth's surface.

The statement continued,

Present understanding of the Earth climate system provides a compelling basis for legitimate public concern over future global and regional-scale changes resulting from increased concentrations of greenhouse gases.

After a discussion of scientific uncertainties the statement concluded

AGU believes that the present level of scientific uncertainty does not justify inaction in the mitigation of human induced climate change and/or the adaptation to it.

The adopted position statement was backed up by a detailed supporting document. The AGU position statement has undergone several revisions, most recently revised and reaffirmed in 2012.

In 2014, AGU developed the Sharing Science program to provide scientists with the skills and tools that they need to communicate science with any audience. The program offers resources, workshops, hands-on support, and opportunities to help scientists more effectively communicate with broader audiences about Earth and space science. Audiences range from journalists, educators and students, policy makers, and the broader public.

Members of the AGU who work in politically controversial fields have come under legal attack. For example, Michael Mann, a Fellow of the AGU and lead author of the original "hockey stick graph" study, faced a legal demand to turn over his private emails from Kenneth Cuccinelli II, at the time the attorney general of the state of Virginia, a conservative Republican who argues that there is no persuasive evidence that human activity is warming the planet. The court rejected Cuccinelli's demand. However, such legal challenges continue, so in 2012 AGU entered in a partnership with the Climate Science Legal Defense Fund to offer legal counseling at the Fall Meeting.

== Scientific ethics ==
In 2011, AGU created a Task Force on Scientific Ethics, "to review and update existing policies and procedures for dealing with scientific misconduct." This effort received a setback when its chairman, Peter Gleick, announced that he had lied to obtain internal documents from the Heartland Institute and then leaked them to the public. Gleick, a climate scientist and recipient of the MacArthur Fellowship, said he was motivated by frustration with the efforts of groups such as the Heartland Institute to attack climate science and scientists, but admitted that it was a serious lapse of judgement. He resigned from the task force on February 16, 2012, and was replaced by Linda Gundersen, director of the Office of Science Quality and Integrity at the United States Geological Survey (USGS).

In 2017, AGU adopted and updated ethics policy, called the AGU Scientific Integrity and Professional Ethics. Among other updates, the policy updated its definitions of what counts as scientific misconduct to include harassment, bullying, and discrimination. The change came, in part, as a result of a 2016 workshop AGU convened to address the challenge of sexual and gender-based harassment, with co-sponsorship by the American Association for the Advancement of Science, the American Chemical Society (ACS), the American Geosciences Institute (AGI), the Association for Women Geoscientists (AWG), and the Earth Science Women's Network (ESWN). Additionally, AGU staff are trained in how to address incidents of harassment at their annual meeting and wear "Safe AGU" buttons to signify themselves as resources.

On February 27, 2018, AGU CEO Chris McEntee testified before the House Committee on Science, Space, & Technology Subcommittee on Research and Technology Hearing – A Review of Sexual Harassment and Misconduct in Science. His testimony was alongside those of Rhonda Davis, head of the National Science Foundation's (NSF) Office of Diversity and Inclusion, Kathryn Clancy, an anthropologist at the University of Illinois at Urbana-Champaign, and attorney Kristina Larsen.

In July 2019, the AGU was awarded a three-year grant from the Alfred P. Sloan Foundation to launch the AGU Ethics and Equity Initiative, a collaboration among the AGU and the National Center for Professional and Research Ethics at the University of Illinois at Urbana–Champaign. The initiative will tackle issues around sexual harassment and gender-based discrimination by developing new educational resources and tracking tools to measure impact.

In December 2022, AGU punished climate scientists Rose Abramoff and Peter Kalmus for misconduct, who interrupted a plenary session of the annual Fall Meeting with a call for scientists to engage in protest against climate change. AGU removed their research presentations from the meeting, banned them from participation, launched a misconduct inquiry, and complained to Abramoff's employer, Oak Ridge National Laboratory. Kalmus and Abramoff further claimed that AGU threatened to have them arrested if they returned to the meeting. Abramoff was fired by Oak Ridge in January 2023.

== Corporate sponsorship ==
In 2014, the AGU accepted 5469 gifts, grants and pledges from individuals and corporations. Of these, the 1919 Society (gifts of over $100,000) included ExxonMobil, Integrated Ocean Drilling Program Management International, and Nature's Own. AGU also was found to have many annual events sponsored by corporations, including an annual Student Breakfast (supported by ExxonMobil) and Amazon Web Services supported research grants and that offer access to its cloud computing resources. In 2015, the AGU Board approved a new Organizational Support Policy. The policy covers subjects such as advertorials and member surveys. It requires that partnerships contribute to AGU's mission, vision and goals and that the AGU "apply vetting to ascertain that partners are not engaged in false misinterpretations of science."

The sponsorship of AGU by ExxonMobil became a source of concern for many members after evidence surfaced that ExxonMobil had known about climate change for decades but had actively worked to undermine climate science. On February 22, 2016, a letter signed by 100 scientists was delivered to the AGU, requesting that they cut all ties with ExxonMobil and other companies that foster climate misinformation. The AGU Board of Directors met on April 22, 2016, and voted to continue accepting sponsorship from ExxonMobil, arguing that there was not unequivocal evidence that ExxonMobil continues to participate in climate misinformation. Instead of making a short-term political statement, the Board wished to engage with the energy industry over the long term. In response, Senator Sheldon Whitehouse and Representative Ted Lieu sent a critical letter saying that ExxonMobil continues to fund climate denial and is misleading the AGU. The Union of Concerned Scientists also sent a letter urging them to reconsider. However, in a meeting on September 23, 2016, the Board upheld its previous decision.

== Fossil fuel divestment ==
In November 2021, AGU announced in a video presentation that, as a consequence of its Environmental, social, and corporate governance policies, it no longer had any direct investments in fossil-fuel companies and it was beginning to divest its investment portfolio from mutual fund holdings in fossil-fuel companies.

== See also ==
- Geological Society of America
- List of geoscience organizations
- List of geophysicists
- Scientific consensus on climate change
