= John Orcutt =

American geophysicist

John Orcutt is an American geophysicist who served as distinguished professor at the Scripps Institution of Oceanography. He received his master's degree from the University of Liverpool and his doctorate from the Scripps Institute of Oceanography. He was the president of the American Geophysical Union from 2002 to 2004. He founded and served as chief editor of the union's open-access journal Earth & Space Science.
