= Erica Davidson (disambiguation) =

Erica Davidson or Erika Davidson may refer to:

- Erika Davidson (1926–2007), American photographer of live theatre
- Erica Davidson (Prisoner), a character from the Australian TV series Prisoner, played by Patsy King
- Erica Davidson (Wentworth), a character from the Australian TV series Wentworth, played by Leeanna Walsman

== See also ==
- Eric Davidson (disambiguation)
