= William C. Ackermann =

William C. Ackermann (1914–1988) was an American hydrologist. He was the president of the American Geophysical Union from 1966 to 1968. He was elected to the National Academy of Engineering in 1967, had the William C. Ackermann Medal named after him by the American Water Resources Association.
