= Michael McPhaden =

American oceanographer

Michael McPhaden is an American oceanographer who served as president of the American Geophysical Union. He received his BS in physics from the University at Buffalo in 1973 and his PhD in physical oceanography from the Scripps Institution of Oceanography in 1980. He is a fellow of the The Oceanography Society and the American Meteorological Society, and senior fellow of the Cooperative Institute for Climate, Ocean, and Ecosystem Studies. He has served as a senior scientist at the National Oceanic and Atmospheric Administration.
