= Margaret Leinen =

American scientist

Margaret Sandra Leinen
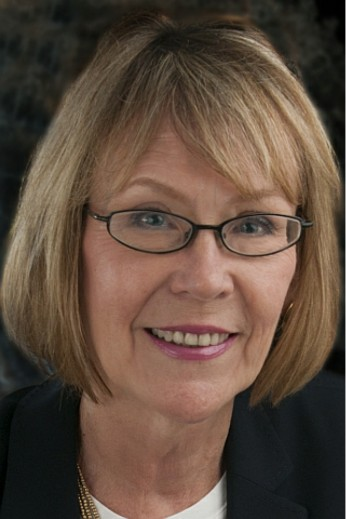
- Margaret S. Leinen, 2011. NSF (USA), Geological Sciences Directorate
- Born: September 20, 1946 (age 80); Chicago, Illinois, USA
- Education: University of Rhode Island
- Occupations: Academic, University Administrator, Director
- Known for: Cenozoic marine sediment characteristics, university and government administration
- Scientific career
- Fields: Paleoceanography, Paleoclimatology
- Workplaces: Scripps Institution of Oceanography; University of California, San Diego; University of Rhode Island
- Thesis: Paleochemical signatures in Cenozoic Pacific sediments (1979)
- Doctoral advisor: G. Ross Heath
- Website: mleinen.scrippsprofiles.ucsd.edu

Margaret S. Leinen (born September 20, 1946) is an American paleoceanographer and paleoclimatologist. In the 1990s she served as a dean and the Vice Provost for Marine and Environmental Programs at the University of Rhode Island and was appointed as the head of the Geosciences Directorate of the National Science Foundation in January, 2000. She founded the Climate Response Fund, a non-profit focused on enabling better understanding, regulation and responsible use of climate engineering research, and served as its president. She also served as chief science officer for a startup company in green technology and climate change mitigation. She served the executive director of the Harbor Branch Oceanographic Institute Marine and Environmental Initiatives at Florida Atlantic University. In 2013, Leinen was appointed the 11th director of the Scripps Institution of Oceanography, as well as the dean of the School of Marine Sciences at the University of California, San Diego. She has also served as the U.S. Department of State science envoy for the oceans to Latin America and the Pacific.

== Early life and education ==
Margaret Leinen was born in Chicago, Illinois, on 20 September 1946 to Earl John Leinen and Ester Louis Leinen. She earned a Bachelor of Science degree in geology from the [University of Illinois Urbana-Champaign]] in 1969, a master's degree in geological oceanography from Oregon State University in 1975, and a doctorate in oceanography from the University of Rhode Island in 1980.

== Professional career ==
Upon earning her doctoral degree, Leinen began her career as a research scientist and faculty member at URI, and quickly demonstrated a talent for academic administration. From 1991 to 1999 she served the Vice Provost for Marine and Environmental Programs at the University of Rhode Island, and between 1995 and 1999, simultaneously served as the dean of two URI colleges (Graduate School of Oceanography and College of the Environment and Life Sciences). In January, 2000 Leinen was appointed as the head of the Geosciences Directorate of the National Science Foundation. She founded the Climate Response Fund, a 501-c3 non-profit organization focused on enabling better understanding, regulation and responsible use of climate engineering research, and served as its president for a time. For two years, Leinen also worked as chief science officer for a startup company in green technology and climate change mitigation. She served the executive director of the Harbor Branch Oceanographic Institute Marine and Environmental Initiatives at Florida Atlantic University. In 2013, Leinen was appointed the 11th director of the Scripps Institution of Oceanography, as well as the Vice Chancellor for Marine Sciences at the University of California, San Diego, and served until 2025.

== Honors ==
Dr. Leinen was elected fellow of the American Association for the Advancement of Science and of the Geological Society of America. In 2016, she was selected as a U.S. Science Envoy by the United States State Department. In 2020, Leinen was elected to the American Academy of Arts and Sciences and was named a fellow of The Oceanography Society and an Honorary Member of the American Meteorological Society in 2022.

== Service ==
Dr. Leinen was selected to serve as co-chair of the Decade Advisory Board for UN Decade of Ocean Science for Sustainable Development and is a member of the Leadership Council of the Joint Ocean Commission Initiative. She has served as president of the American Geophysical Union, chair of the Atmospheric and Hydrospheric Science Section of the American Academy for the Advancement of Science, and president of the Oceanography Society. She serves on the boards of the California Ocean Science Trust and Science Counts. She is the vice chair of the research board of the $500 million Gulf of Mexico Research Initiative.

== Selected publications ==
- Leinen, Margaret (1989), "The pelagic clay province of the North Pacific Ocean", The Eastern Pacific Ocean and Hawaii, North America: Geological Society of America, pp. 323–335, doi:10.1130/dnag-gna-n.323, ISBN 0-8137-5208-6
- Blank, Marsha; Leinen, Margaret; Prospero, Joseph M. (March 1985). "Major Asian aeolian inputs indicated by the mineralogy of aerosols and sediments in the western North Pacific". Nature. 314 (6006): 84–86. Bibcode:1985Natur.314...84B. doi:10.1038/314084a0. ISSN 1476-4687.
- Schmidt, Gavin A.; Severinghaus, Jeff; Abe-Ouchi, Ayako; Alley, Richard B.; Broecker, Wallace; Brook, Ed; Etheridge, David; Kawamura, Kenji; Keeling, Ralph F.; Leinen, Margaret; Marvel, Kate; Stocker, Thomas F. (July 2017). "Overestimate of committed warming". Nature. 547 (7662): E16–E17. Bibcode:2017Natur.547E..16S. doi:10.1038/nature22803. ISSN 1476-4687. PMC 5885753. PMID 28703191.
- Doh, Seong-Jae; King, John W.; Leinen, Margaret (August 1988). "A rock-magnetic study of giant piston core LL44-GPC3 from the central North Pacific and its paleoceanographic implications". Paleoceanography. 3 (1): 89–111. Bibcode:1988PalOc...3...89D. doi:10.1029/PA003i001p00089. ISSN 0883-8305.
- Rea, David K.; Leinen, Margaret; Janecek, Thomas R. (February 15, 1985). "Geologic Approach to the Long-Term History of Atmospheric Circulation". Science. 227 (4688): 721–725. Bibcode:1985Sci...227..721R. doi:10.1126/science.227.4688.721. ISSN 0036-8075. PMID 17796713.
- Leinen, Margaret; Prospero, Joseph M.; Arnold, Eve; Blank, Marsha (October 20, 1994). "Mineralogy of aeolian dust reaching the North Pacific Ocean: 1. Sampling and analysis". Journal of Geophysical Research: Atmospheres. 99 (D10): 21017–21023. Bibcode:1994JGR....9921017L. doi:10.1029/94JD01735. ISSN 0148-0227.
