= Tustumena Glacier =

Glacier in Alaska, United States

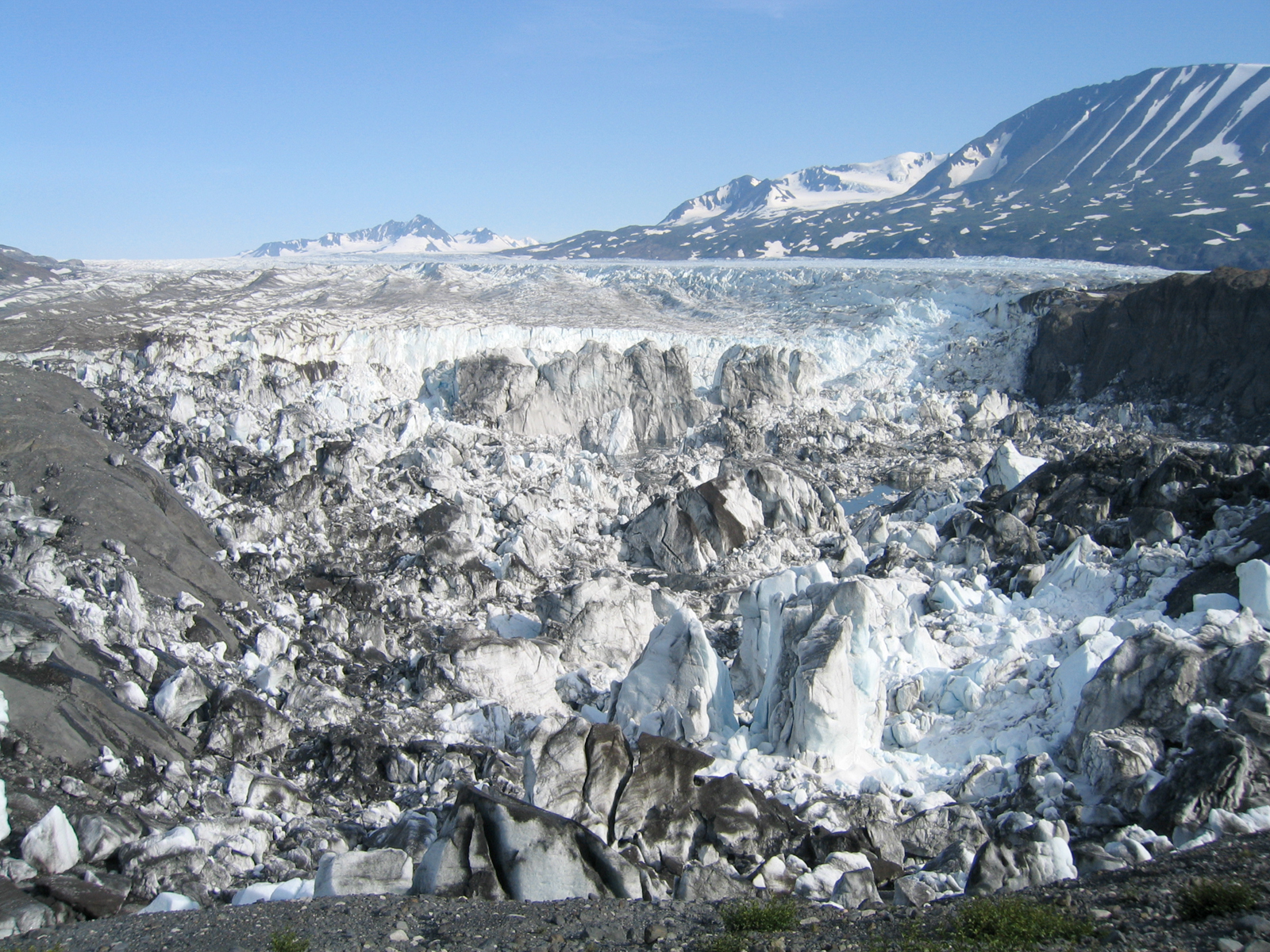
- View of the Tustemena Glacier across the drained ice-margin Arctic Lake.

- Location within Alaska
- Interactive map of Tustumena Glacier
- Type: Mountain glacier
- Location: Kenai Peninsula Borough, Alaska, U.S.
- Coordinates: 59°59′47″N 150°21′34″W
- Length: 20 m (66 ft)
- Terminus: Glacial lake
- Status: Retreating

The Tustumena Glacier is a glacier located on the Kenai Peninsula of Alaska. The Tustumena Glacier begins in the Harding Icefield and makes its way down west for about 20 miles (32 km) until its terminus roughly 5 miles (8.0 km) before Tustumena Lake. The glacier is retreating due to global warming.

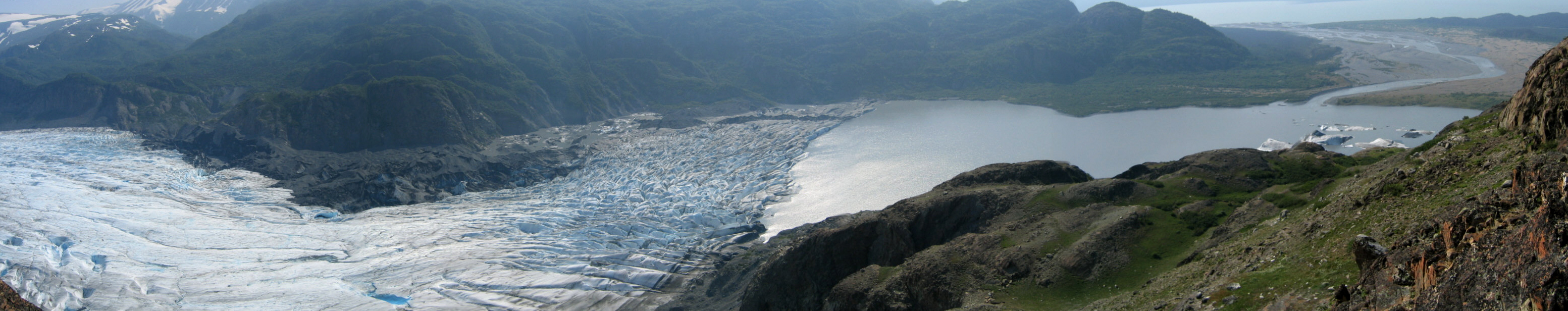
Tustemena Glacier, and its outflow into Tustemena Lake

A small lake called Arctic Lake sits alongside Tustumena Glacier, with its outflow underneath the ice. This lake periodically fills up and then drains as the glacier moves, leaving icebergs stranded in the sand.

The Alaska Marine Highway ferry Tustumena derives its name from this glacier.

== See also ==
- List of glaciers
