= Brendan Jones =

Brendan Jones may refer to:

- Brendan Jones (golfer) (born 1975), Australian golfer
- Brendan Jones (radio personality) (born 1968), Australian radio presenter
- Brendan Jones (baseball), American baseball player

== See also ==
- Brenden Jones (born 1974), American politician
- Brandon Jones (disambiguation)
