= Tim Grove =

American geologist

Timothy L. Grove is an American geologist who served as president of the American Geophysical Union, of which he is a fellow and received a Harry H. Hess medal, from 2008 to 2010.

In 2008, Grove was elected as a member of the American Academy of Arts and Sciences.
