= Arthur E. Maxwell =

American scientist

Arthur E. Maxwell (1925-2019) was an American World War II veteran and scientist who was the president of the American Geophysical Union from 1976 to 1978. He also served as president of the Marine Technology Society. He received his bachelor's degree from New Mexico Tech and his graduate degree from the Scripps Institute of Oceanography.
