= David Perlman =

American science journalist (1918–2020)

- Born: December 30, 1918; Baltimore, Maryland, U.S.
- Died: June 19, 2020 (aged 101); San Francisco, California, U.S.
- Education: Columbia University (BA, MA)
- Occupation: Journalist

David Perlman (December 30, 1918 – June 19, 2020) was an American science journalist based in San Francisco, California, who was the science editor for the San Francisco Chronicle.

== Early life and education ==
Perlman was born in Baltimore, Maryland, and raised on the Upper West Side of Manhattan. Perlman graduated from Columbia College, where he worked for the student newspaper Columbia Daily Spectator in 1939 and the Columbia University Graduate School of Journalism in 1940.

== Career ==
He began his career as a reporter in 1940 at the San Francisco Chronicle, where he started covering science in 1957, after breaking his leg while skiing and reading about astronomy during his recovery. He became the Chronicle's science editor emeritus after retiring in August 2017 at the age of 98. In a 2017 interview for Poynter, he stated that cuts to science coverage in the media are "absolutely obscene" and create "a generation with a major disability in what they can think about and understand."

In 2000, the American Geological Union recognized his contributions to science news reporting by instituting the "David Perlman Award for Excellence in Science Journalism—News". A former president of the National Association of Science Writers and the Council for the Advancement of Science Writing, he was a Fellow of the California Academy of Sciences. He was the recipient of journalism awards from the American Association for the Advancement of Science, the Society of Professional Journalists, the American Chemical Society, the American Geophysical Union and the United States Geological Survey.

== Death ==
Perlman died on June 19, 2020, at the age of 101.
