= Eric A. Davidson =

Eric Davidson
- Education: Oberlin College (B.A.); North Carolina State University (Ph.D.)
- Known for: Soil nitrogen and carbon cycling research Global biogeochemical budgets of nitrogen and nitrous oxide
- Scientific career
- Fields: Biogeochemistry; Ecology; Soil science
- Workplaces: University of California, Berkeley (1986-1989); NASA Ames Research Center (1989-1991); Woods Hole Research Center (1991-2013); University of Maryland Center for Environmental Science (2015-2025); Spark Climate Solutions (2022-present)

Eric Davidson is an American biogeochemist whose research focuses on terrestrial nutrient cycling, greenhouse gas emissions from soils, and sustainable agriculture. He was previously President of the American Geophysical Union and President and Executive Director at the Woods Hole Research Center (now Woodwell Climate Research Center), and Professor and Director of the University of Maryland Center for Environmental Science (UMCES) Appalachian Laboratory. Davidson is currently Principal Scientist of Spark Climate Solutions and Professor Emeritus at UMCES and is a fellow of the American Association for the Advancement of Science.

Davidson has been frequently designated a Highly Cited Researcher by Clarivate (2007, 2015-2022, 2025-2026).

== Early life and education ==
Davidson grew up in Montana. He received his B.A. in biology from Oberlin College in 1978 and his Ph.D. from the Department of Forestry at North Carolina State University in 1986. He subsequently held postdoctoral positions in soil microbiology and biogeochemistry at the University of California, Berkeley and at the NASA Ames Research Center.

== Career ==
Davidson joined the Woods Hole Research Center in 1991 as a research scientist and later served as its President and Executive Director (2011-2013). He subsequently became a professor at the Appalachian Laboratory of the University of Maryland Center for Environmental Science, where he also served as Director for six years before becoming Professor Emeritus.

Since 2022, he has served as Principal Scientist at Spark Climate Solutions.

=== Editorial roles ===
Davidson has served as Senior Editor of AGU Advances since 2019. He previously served as Senior Editor of Global Biogeochemical Cycles and Senior Subject Editor of Global Change Biology, and as a member of the editorial board of the Soil Science Society of America Journal. He was North American Center Director of the International Nitrogen Initiative from 2010 to 2014 and a project scientist for NASA's Large-Scale Biosphere-Atmosphere Experiment in Amazonia (LBA) from 2008 to 2011.

== Research ==
Davidson's research examines the exchange of greenhouse gases—including nitrous oxide, methane, and carbon dioxide—between soils and the atmosphere, including the environmental consequences of nitrogen losses from agriculture. His work spans forest, pasture, and agricultural ecosystems in North and South America.

Davidson was a chapter co-lead for the United Nations Environment Programme (UNEP) synthesis report on nitrous oxide sources, inventories, and projections, and has participated in a range of international scientific coordination efforts related to nitrogen and climate. His research is frequently cited in literature on sustainable agriculture, with more than 70,000 citations, and has been covered in outlets including NPR and Canary Media.

In 2000, Davidson published his first book, "You Can't Eat GNP: Economics As Though Ecology Mattered" via Perseus Books Group. In 2022, he published his second book, "Science for a Green New Deal: Connecting Climate, Economics, and Social Justice" in Johns Hopkins University Press. He has stated he wrote the latter because "I wanted to instill a sense of hope and offer an antidote for a growing sense of doom regarding climate change, wealth disparity, and social injustice."

== Books ==
- Davidson, Eric A. (2000). You Can't Eat GNP: Economics As If Ecology Mattered. Cambridge, MA: Perseus Publishing. ISBN 0-7382-0487-0.
- Davidson, Eric A. (2022). Science for a Green New Deal: Connecting Climate, Economics, and Social Justice. Baltimore, MD: Johns Hopkins University Press. ISBN 9781421444345.

== Awards and recognition ==
- Fulbright-Nehru Distinguished Senior Scholar, 2025.
- Jefferson Science Fellow, National Academy of Sciences, U.S. Dept. of State, 2021-2022.
- Fellow, American Geophysical Union, 2019.
- Fellow, American Association for the Advancement of Science, 2010.
- ISI/Clarivate/Publons Highly Cited Researcher, 2007, 2015-2022, 2025.
