= Cryosphere =

Earth's surface where water is frozen

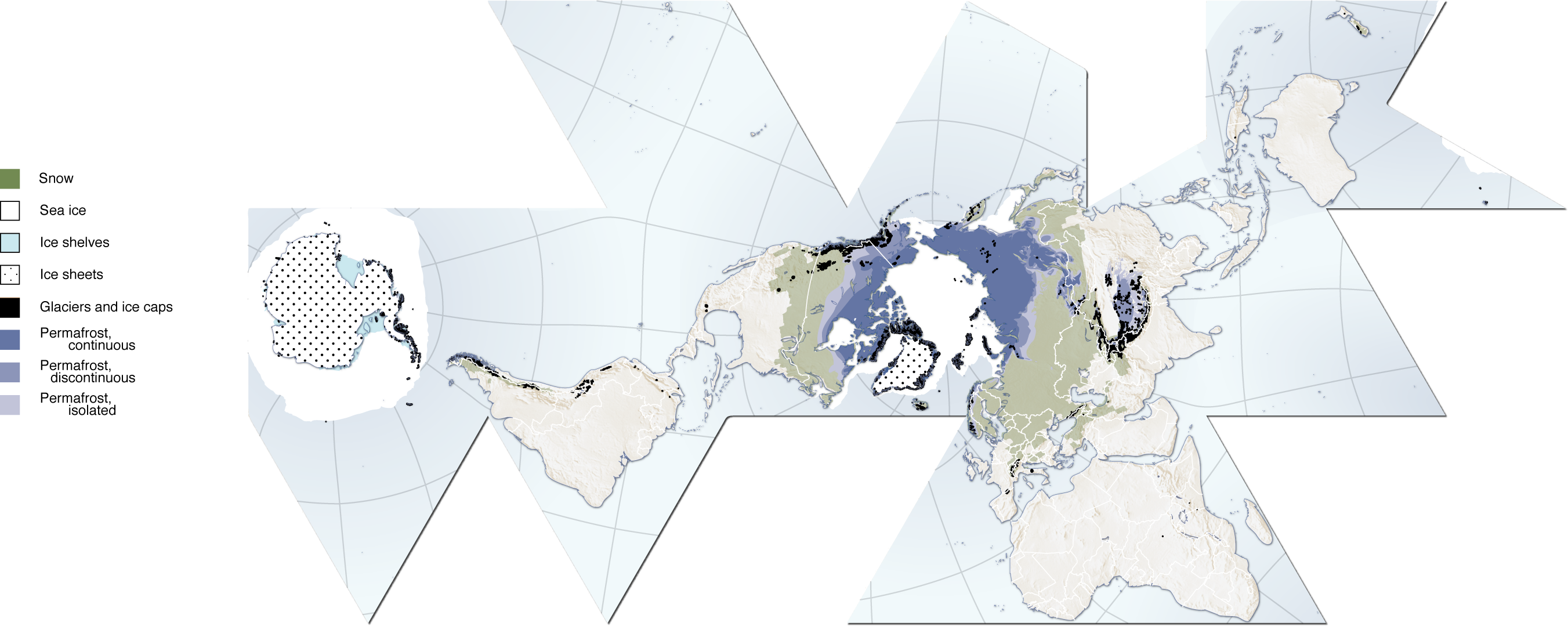
Overview of the cryosphere and its larger components

The cryosphere is an umbrella term for those portions of Earth's surface where water is in solid form. This includes sea ice, ice on lakes or rivers, snow, glaciers, ice caps, ice sheets, and frozen ground (which includes permafrost). Thus, there is an overlap with the hydrosphere. The cryosphere is an integral part of the global climate system. It also has important feedbacks on the climate system. These feedbacks come from the cryosphere's influence on surface energy and moisture fluxes, clouds, the water cycle, atmospheric and oceanic circulation.

Through these feedback processes, the cryosphere plays a significant role in the global climate and in climate model response to global changes. Approximately 10% of the Earth's surface is covered by ice, but this is rapidly decreasing. Current reductions in the cryosphere (caused by climate change) are measurable in ice sheet melt, glaciers decline, sea ice decline, permafrost thaw and snow cover decrease.

== Definition and terminology ==
The cryosphere describes those portions of Earth's surface where water is in solid form. Frozen water is found on the Earth's surface primarily as snow cover, freshwater ice in lakes and rivers, sea ice, glaciers, ice sheets, and frozen ground and permafrost (permanently frozen ground).

The cryosphere is one of five components of the climate system. The others are the atmosphere, the hydrosphere, the lithosphere and the biosphere.

The term cryosphere comes from the Greek word kryos, meaning cold, frost or ice and the Greek word sphaira, meaning globe or ball.

Cryospheric sciences is an umbrella term for the study of the cryosphere. As an interdisciplinary Earth science, many disciplines contribute to it, most notably geology, hydrology, and meteorology and climatology; in this sense, it is comparable to glaciology.

The term deglaciation describes the retreat of cryospheric features.

== Properties and interactions ==
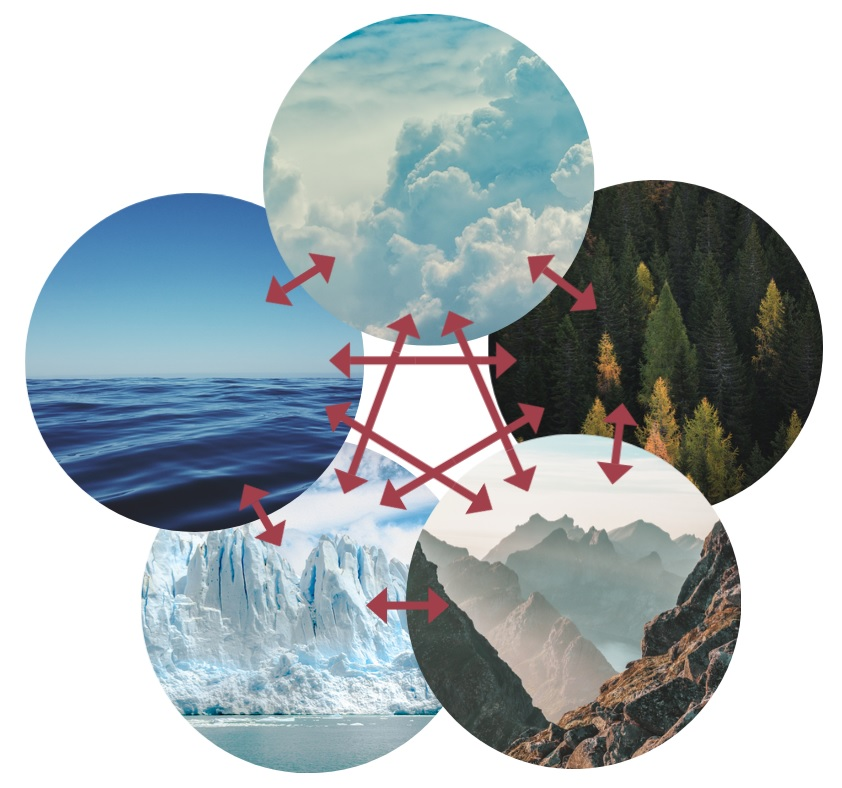
The cryosphere (bottom left) is one of five components of the climate system. The others are the atmosphere, the hydrosphere, the lithosphere and the biosphere.

There are several fundamental physical properties of snow and ice that modulate energy exchanges between the surface and the atmosphere. The most important properties are the surface reflectance (albedo), the ability to transfer heat (thermal diffusivity), and the ability to change state (latent heat). These physical properties, together with surface roughness, emissivity, and dielectric characteristics, have important implications for observing snow and ice from space. For example, surface roughness is often the dominant factor determining the strength of radar backscatter. Physical properties such as crystal structure, density, length, and liquid water content are important factors affecting the transfers of heat and water and the scattering of microwave energy.

=== Residence time and extent ===
The residence time of water in each of the cryospheric sub-systems varies widely. Snow cover and freshwater ice are essentially seasonal, and most sea ice, except for ice in the central Arctic, lasts only a few years if it is not seasonal. A given water particle in glaciers, ice sheets, or ground ice, however, may remain frozen for 10–100,000 years or longer, and deep ice in parts of East Antarctica may have an age approaching 1 million years.

Most of the world's ice volume is in Antarctica, principally in the East Antarctic Ice Sheet. In terms of areal extent, however, Northern Hemisphere winter snow and ice extent comprise the largest area, amounting to an average 23% of hemispheric surface area in January. The large areal extent and the important climatic roles of snow and ice is related to their unique physical properties. This also indicates that the ability to observe and model snow and ice-cover extent, thickness, and radiative and thermal properties is of particular significance for climate research.

=== Surface reflectance ===
The surface reflectance of incoming solar radiation is important for the surface energy balance (SEB). It is the ratio of reflected to incident solar radiation, commonly referred to as albedo. Climatologists are primarily interested in albedo integrated over the shortwave portion of the electromagnetic spectrum (~300 to 3500 nm), which coincides with the main solar energy input. Typically, albedo values for non-melting snow-covered surfaces are high (~80–90%) except in the case of forests.

The higher albedos for snow and ice cause rapid shifts in surface reflectivity in autumn and spring in high latitudes, but the overall climatic significance of this increase is spatially and temporally modulated by cloud cover. (Planetary albedo is determined principally by cloud cover, and by the small amount of total solar radiation received in high latitudes during winter months.) Summer and autumn are times of high-average cloudiness over the Arctic Ocean so the albedo feedback associated with the large seasonal changes in sea-ice extent is greatly reduced. It was found that snow cover exhibited the greatest influence on Earth's radiative balance in the spring (April to May) period when incoming solar radiation was greatest over snow-covered areas.

=== Thermal properties of cryospheric elements ===
The thermal properties of cryospheric elements also have important climatic consequences. Snow and ice have much lower thermal diffusivities than air. Thermal diffusivity is a measure of the speed at which temperature waves can penetrate a substance. Snow and ice are many orders of magnitude less efficient at diffusing heat than air. Snow cover insulates the ground surface, and sea ice insulates the underlying ocean, decoupling the surface-atmosphere interface with respect to both heat and moisture fluxes. The flux of moisture from a water surface is eliminated by even a thin skin of ice, whereas the flux of heat through thin ice continues to be substantial until it attains a thickness in excess of 30 to 40 cm. However, even a small amount of snow on top of the ice will dramatically reduce the heat flux and slow down the rate of ice growth. The insulating effect of snow also has major implications for the hydrological cycle. In non-permafrost regions, the insulating effect of snow is such that only near-surface ground freezes and deep-water drainage is uninterrupted.

While snow and ice act to insulate the surface from large energy losses in winter, they also act to retard warming in the spring and summer because of the large amount of energy required to melt ice (the latent heat of fusion, 3.34 × 10^{5} J/kg at 0 °C). However, the strong static stability of the atmosphere over areas of extensive snow or ice tends to confine the immediate cooling effect to a relatively shallow layer, so that associated atmospheric anomalies are usually short-lived and local to regional in scale. In some areas of the world such as Eurasia, however, the cooling associated with a heavy snowpack and moist spring soils is known to play a role in modulating the summer monsoon circulation.

=== Climate change feedback mechanisms ===
There are numerous cryosphere-climate feedbacks in the global climate system. These operate over a wide range of spatial and temporal scales from local seasonal cooling of air temperatures to hemispheric-scale variations in ice sheets over time scales of thousands of years. The feedback mechanisms involved are often complex and incompletely understood. For example, Curry et al. (1995) showed that the so-called "simple" sea ice-albedo feedback involved complex interactions with lead fraction, melt ponds, ice thickness, snow cover, and sea-ice extent.

The role of snow cover in modulating the monsoon is just one example of a short-term cryosphere-climate feedback involving the land surface and the atmosphere.

== Components ==
=== Glaciers and ice sheets ===
Representation of glaciers on a topographic map

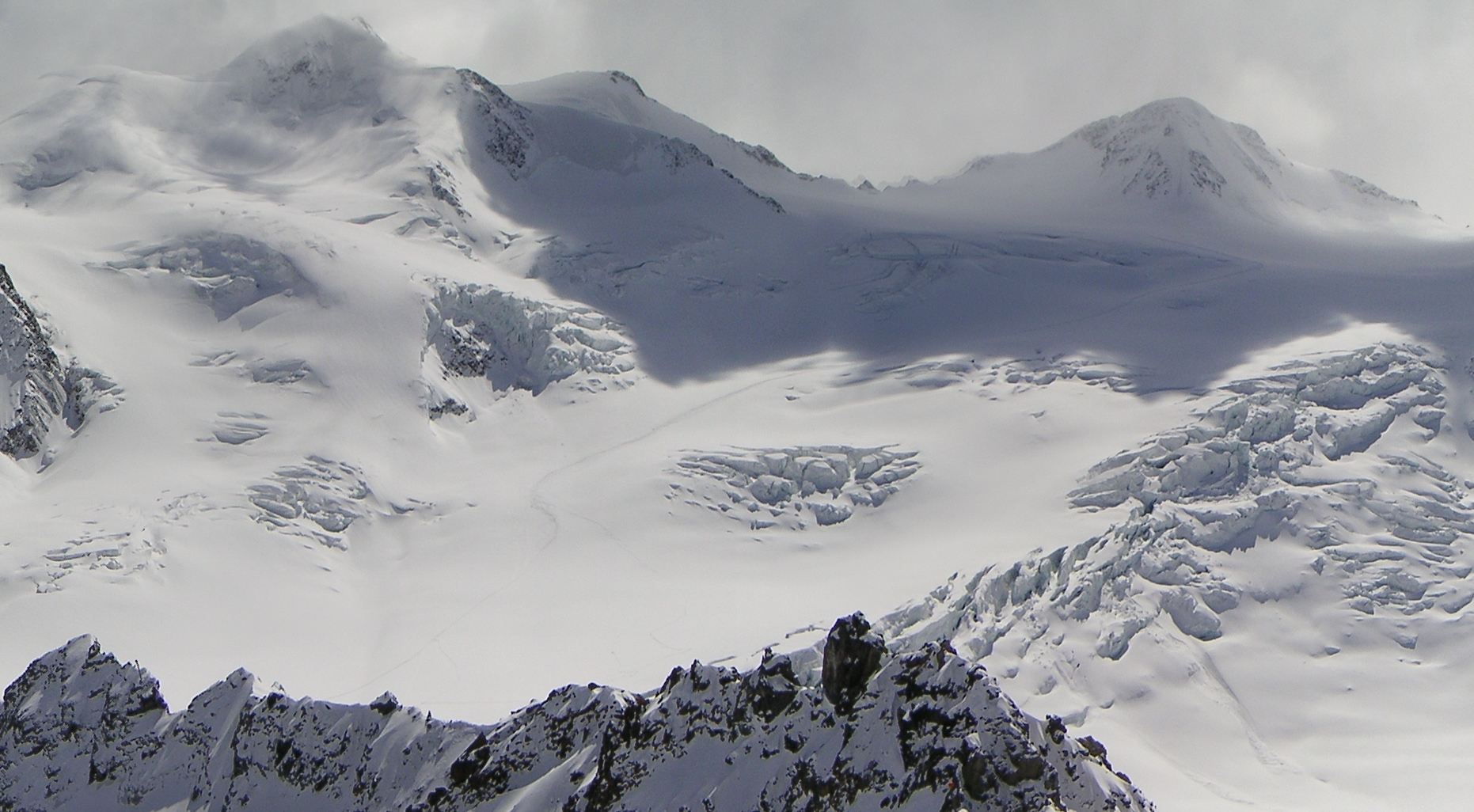
The Taschachferner glacier in the Ötztal Alps in Austria. The mountain to the left is the Wildspitze (3.768 m), second highest in Austria. To the right is an area with open crevasses where the glacier flows over a kind of large cliff.

Ice sheets and glaciers are flowing ice masses that rest on solid land. They are controlled by snow accumulation, surface and basal melt, calving into surrounding oceans or lakes and internal dynamics. The latter results from gravity-driven creep flow ("glacial flow") within the ice body and sliding on the underlying land, which leads to thinning and horizontal spreading. Any imbalance of this dynamic equilibrium between mass gain, loss and transport due to flow results in either growing or shrinking ice bodies.

Aerial view of the ice sheet on Greenland's east coast

Relationships between global climate and changes in ice extent are complex. The mass balance of land-based glaciers and ice sheets is determined by the accumulation of snow, mostly in winter, and warm-season ablation due primarily to net radiation and turbulent heat fluxes to melting ice and snow from warm-air advection Where ice masses terminate in the ocean, iceberg calving is the major contributor to mass loss. In this situation, the ice margin may extend out into deep water as a floating ice shelf, such as that in the Ross Sea.

A glacier (US: /ˈɡleɪʃər/; UK: /ˈɡlæsiə/ or /ˈɡleɪsiə/) is a persistent body of natural ice, a form of rock, that is constantly moving under its own weight. A glacier forms where the accumulation of snow exceeds its ablation over many years, often centuries. It slowly flows and deforms under stresses induced by gravity, undergoing both ductile and brittle deformation, and acquiring distinguishing surface features, such as crevasses and seracs. As a glacier moves, it abrades underlying rock and debris to create glacial landforms, such as cirques, moraines, and fjords. Although a glacier may flow into a body of water, and can include ice shelves and ice tongues, it originates only on land and is distinct from the much thinner sea ice and lake ice that form on the surface of freezing bodies of water.

On Earth, 99% of glacial ice is contained within vast ice sheets (also known as "continental glaciers") in the polar regions, but glaciers may be found in mountain ranges on every continent other than the Australian mainland, including Oceania's high-latitude oceanic island countries such as New Zealand. Between latitudes 35°N and 35°S, glaciers occur only in the Himalayas, Andes, and a few high mountains in East Africa, Mexico, New Guinea and on Zard-Kuh in Iran. With more than 7,000 known glaciers, Pakistan has more glacial ice than any other country outside the polar regions. Glaciers cover about 10% of Earth's land surface. Continental glaciers cover nearly 13 million km^{2} (5 million sq mi) or about 98% of Antarctica's 13.2 million km^{2} (5.1 million sq mi), with an average thickness of ice 2,100 m (7,000 ft). Greenland and Patagonia also have huge expanses of continental glaciers. The volume of glaciers, not including the ice sheets of Antarctica and Greenland, has been estimated at 170,000 km^{3}.

Glacial ice is the largest reservoir of fresh water on Earth, holding with ice sheets about 69% of the world's freshwater. Many glaciers from temperate, alpine and seasonal polar climates store water as ice during the colder seasons and release it later in the form of meltwater as warmer summer temperatures cause the glaciers to melt, creating a water source that is especially important for plants, animals and human uses when other sources may be scant. However, within high-altitude and Antarctic environments, the seasonal temperature difference is often not sufficient to release meltwater.

In glaciology, an ice sheet, also known as a continental glacier, is a mass of glacial ice that covers surrounding terrain and is greater than 50,000 km^{2} (19,000 sq mi).

Ice sheets are the largest glacial bodies on Earth, distinguished from smaller ice caps, ice fields, and glaciers. Ice sheets can have multiple ice domes, the topographic highs from which ice flows outwards, and are typically drained by ice streams and outlet glaciers around their periphery. The two extant ice sheets on Earth are the Antarctic ice sheet and the Greenland ice sheet.

Although the surface is cold, the base of an ice sheet is generally warmer by means of geothermal heat. In places, melting occurs and the melt-water lubricates the ice sheet so that it flows more rapidly. This process produces fast-flowing channels within the ice sheet called ice streams. Ice sheets are continually in motion as the ice gradually flows outward from the highest points of the ice sheet towards its margins. The slope of the ice sheet is low around the plateau but increases steeply at its margins.

The growth of ice sheets is a signature of glacial periods, which occur during ice ages. There have been many different ice sheets over Earth's history. At the maximum of the Last Glacial Period, the historic Laurentide and Cordilleran ice sheets merged with the Greenland Ice Sheet to cover much of North America. In the same period, the Weichselian Ice Sheet covered Northern Europe and the Patagonian Ice Sheet covered southern South America. The retreat and disappearance of these ice sheets marked the beginning of the current Holocene interglacial period, and the ongoing retreat and future fate of the Greenland and Antarctic ice sheets plays a major role in climate change and sea level rise.

=== Sea ice ===
Broken pieces of Arctic sea ice with a snow cover

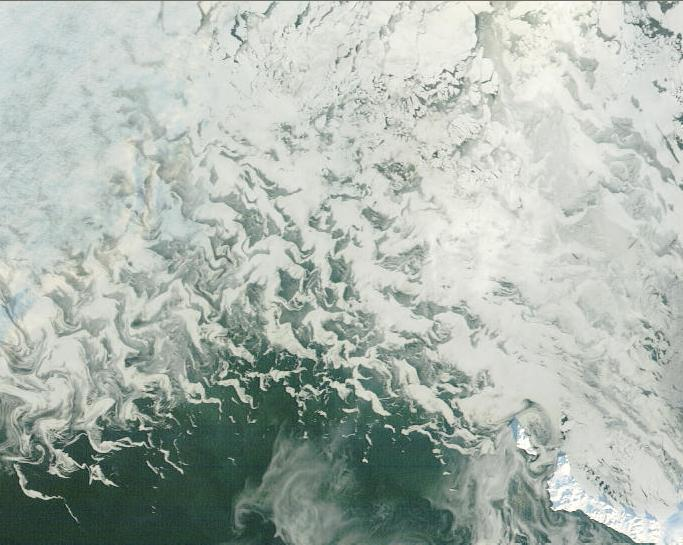
Satellite image of sea ice forming near St. Matthew Island in the Bering Sea

Sea ice covers much of the polar oceans and forms by freezing of sea water. Satellite data since the early 1970s reveal considerable seasonal, regional, and interannual variability in the sea ice covers of both hemispheres. Seasonally, sea-ice extent in the Southern Hemisphere varies by a factor of 5, from a minimum of 3–4 million km^{2} in February to a maximum of 17–20 million km^{2} in September. The seasonal variation is much less in the Northern Hemisphere where the confined nature and high latitudes of the Arctic Ocean result in a much larger perennial ice cover, and the surrounding land limits the equatorward extent of wintertime ice. Thus, the seasonal variability in Northern Hemisphere ice extent varies by only a factor of 2, from a minimum of 7–9 million km^{2} in September to a maximum of 14–16 million km^{2} in March.

The ice cover exhibits much greater regional-scale interannual variability than it does hemispherical. For instance, in the region of the Sea of Okhotsk and Japan, maximum ice extent decreased from 1.3 million km^{2} in 1983 to 0.85 million km^{2} in 1984, a decrease of 35%, before rebounding the following year to 1.2 million km^{2}. The regional fluctuations in both hemispheres are such that for any several-year period of the satellite record some regions exhibit decreasing ice coverage while others exhibit increasing ice cover.

=== Frozen ground and permafrost ===
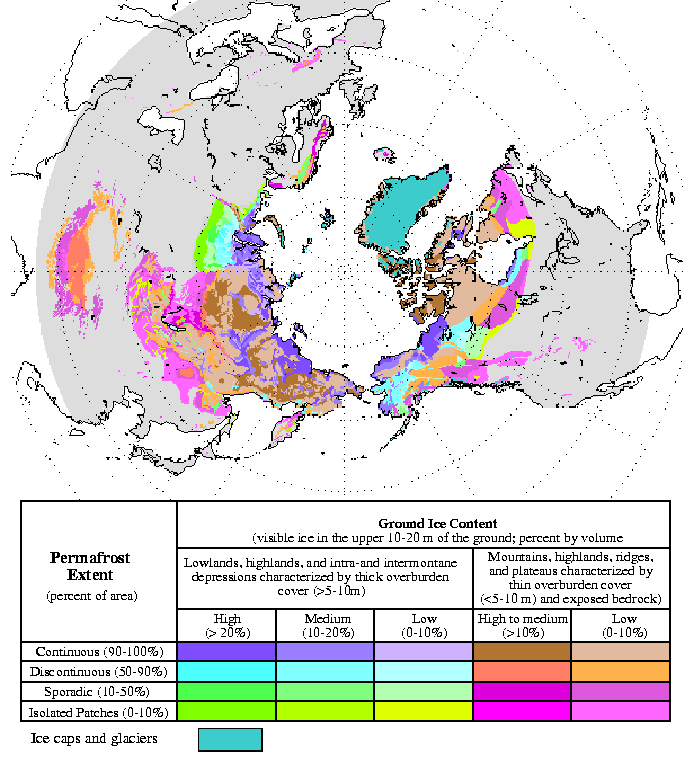
Extent and types of permafrost in the Northern Hemisphere as per International Permafrost Association

Permafrost (from perma- 'permanent' and frost) is soil or underwater sediment which continuously remains below 0 °C (32 °F) for two years or more; the oldest permafrost has been continuously frozen for around 700,000 years. Whilst the shallowest permafrost has a vertical extent of below a meter (3 ft), the deepest is greater than 1,500 m (4,900 ft). Similarly, the area of individual permafrost zones may be limited to narrow mountain summits or extend across vast Arctic regions. The ground beneath glaciers and ice sheets is not usually defined as permafrost, so on land, permafrost is generally located beneath a so-called active layer of soil which freezes and thaws depending on the season.

Around 15% of the exposed land surface of the Northern Hemisphere, and 11% of the global land surface, is underlain by permafrost, covering a total area of around 18 million km^{2} (6.9 million sq mi). This includes large areas of Alaska, Canada, Greenland, and Siberia. It is also located in high mountain regions, with the Tibetan Plateau being a prominent example. Only a minority of permafrost exists in the Southern Hemisphere, where it is consigned to mountain slopes like in the Andes of Patagonia, the Southern Alps of New Zealand, or the highest mountains of Antarctica.

Permafrost contains large amounts of dead biomass that has accumulated throughout millennia without having had the chance to fully decompose and release its carbon, making tundra soil a carbon sink. As global warming heats the ecosystem, frozen soil thaws and becomes warm enough for decomposition to start anew, accelerating the permafrost carbon cycle. Depending on conditions at the time of thaw, decomposition can release either carbon dioxide or methane, and these greenhouse gas emissions act as a climate change feedback. The emissions from thawing permafrost will have a sufficient impact on the climate to impact global carbon budgets. It is difficult to accurately predict how much greenhouse gases the permafrost releases because the different thaw processes are still uncertain. There is widespread agreement that the emissions will be smaller than human-caused emissions and are not large enough to result in runaway warming. Instead, the annual permafrost emissions are likely comparable with global emissions from deforestation, or to annual emissions of large countries such as Russia, the United States or China.

=== Snow cover ===
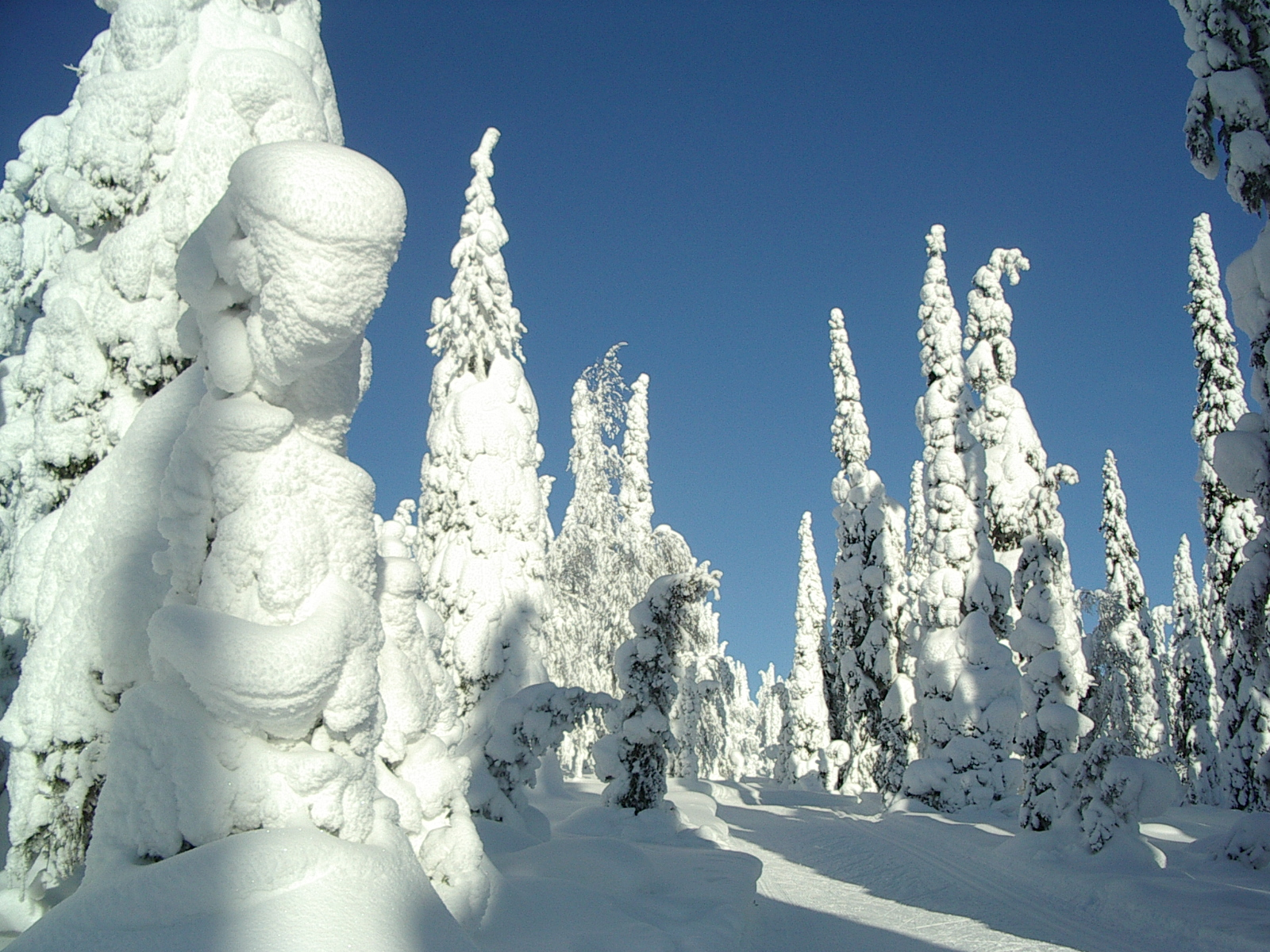
Snow-covered trees in Kuusamo, Finland

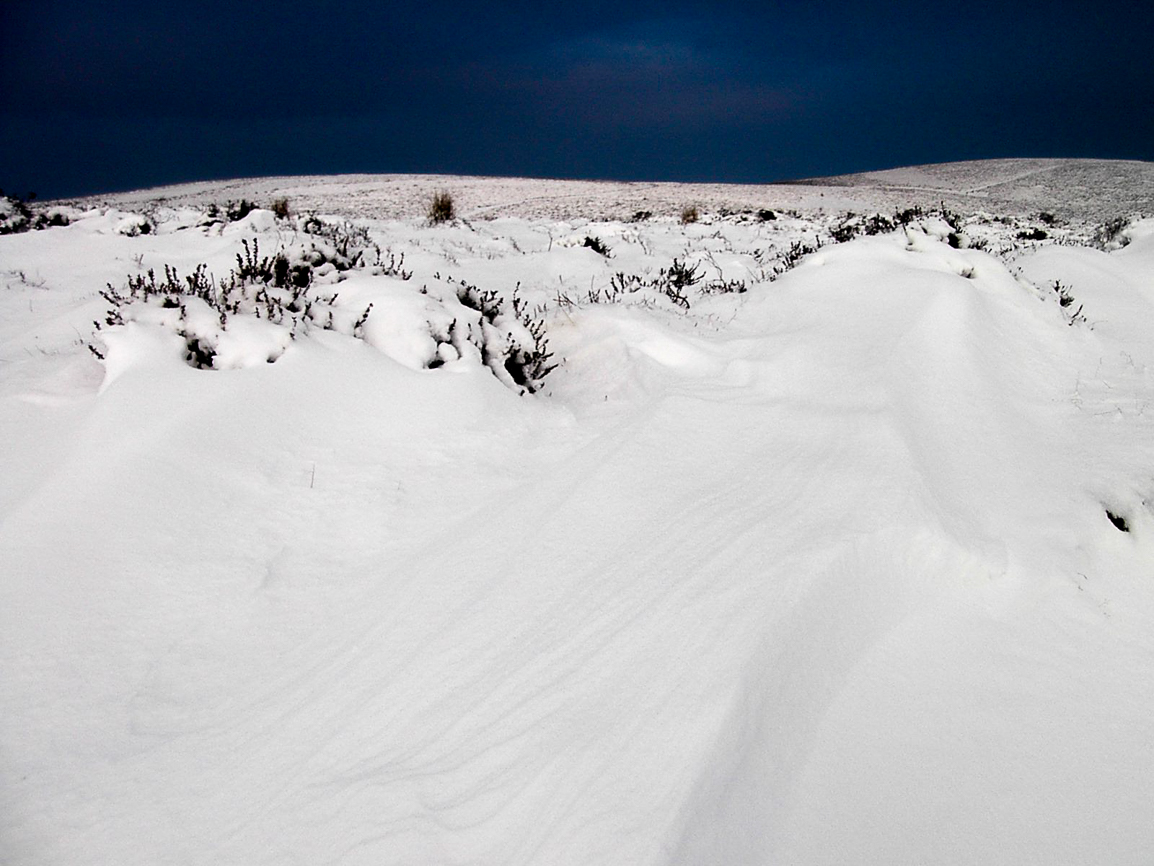
Snow drifts forming around downwind obstructions

Most of the Earth's snow-covered area is located in the Northern Hemisphere, and varies seasonally from 46.5 million km^{2} in January to 3.8 million km^{2} in August.

Snow cover is an extremely important storage component in the water balance, especially seasonal snowpacks in mountainous areas of the world. Though limited in extent, seasonal snowpacks in the Earth's mountain ranges account for the major source of the runoff for stream flow and groundwater recharge over wide areas of the midlatitudes. For example, over 85% of the annual runoff from the Colorado River basin originates as snowmelt. Snowmelt runoff from the Earth's mountains fills the rivers and recharges the aquifers that over a billion people depend on for their water resources.

Furthermore, over 40% of the world's protected areas are in mountains, attesting to their value both as unique ecosystems needing protection and as recreation areas for humans.

=== Ice on lakes and rivers ===
Ice forms on rivers and lakes in response to seasonal cooling. The sizes of the ice bodies involved are too small to exert anything other than localized climatic effects. However, the freeze-up/break-up processes respond to large-scale and local weather factors, such that considerable interannual variability exists in the dates of appearance and disappearance of the ice. Long series of lake-ice observations can serve as a proxy climate record, and the monitoring of freeze-up and break-up trends may provide a convenient integrated and seasonally-specific index of climatic perturbations. Information on river-ice conditions is less useful as a climatic proxy because ice formation is strongly dependent on river-flow regime, which is affected by precipitation, snow melt, and watershed runoff as well as being subject to human interference that directly modifies channel flow, or that indirectly affects the runoff via land-use practices.

Lake freeze-up depends on the heat storage in the lake and therefore on its depth, the rate and temperature of any inflow, and water-air energy fluxes. Information on lake depth is often unavailable, although some indication of the depth of shallow lakes in the Arctic can be obtained from airborne radar imagery during late winter (Sellman et al. 1975) and spaceborne optical imagery during summer (Duguay and Lafleur 1997). The timing of breakup is modified by snow depth on the ice as well as by ice thickness and freshwater inflow.

== Changes caused by climate change ==
Failure to return to 1.5 °C threshold

Many impacts from cryosphere loss will be irreversible on human timescales even if global temperatures are returned to 1.5 °C, especially if thresholds and tipping points are crossed. These include sea-level rise from the melting of ice sheets and glaciers, water security challenges from glacier and snow loss, greenhouse gas emissions from permafrost thaw, polar ocean warming, acidification, ocean circulation disruption, and ecosystem and biodiversity loss.

— International Cryosphere Climate Initiative
2 November 2026

The cryosphere, the area of the Earth covered by snow or ice, is extremely sensitive to changes in global climate. There has been an extensive loss of snow on land since 1981. Some of the largest declines have been observed in the spring. During the 21st century, snow cover is projected to continue its retreat in almost all regions.

=== Ice sheet melt ===
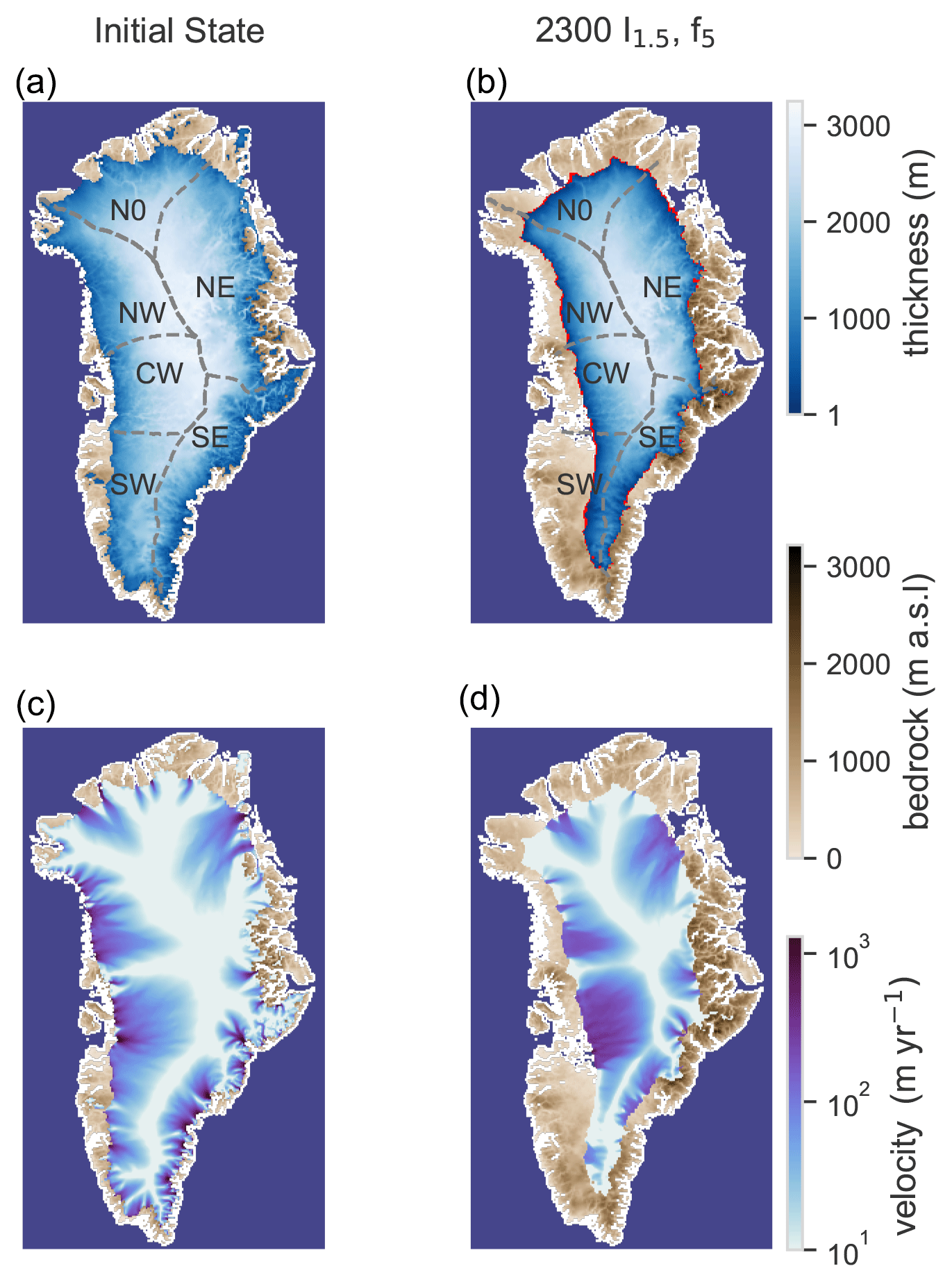
2023 projections of how much the Greenland ice sheet may shrink from its present extent by the year 2300 under the worst possible climate change scenario (upper half) and of how much faster its remaining ice will be flowing in that case (lower half)

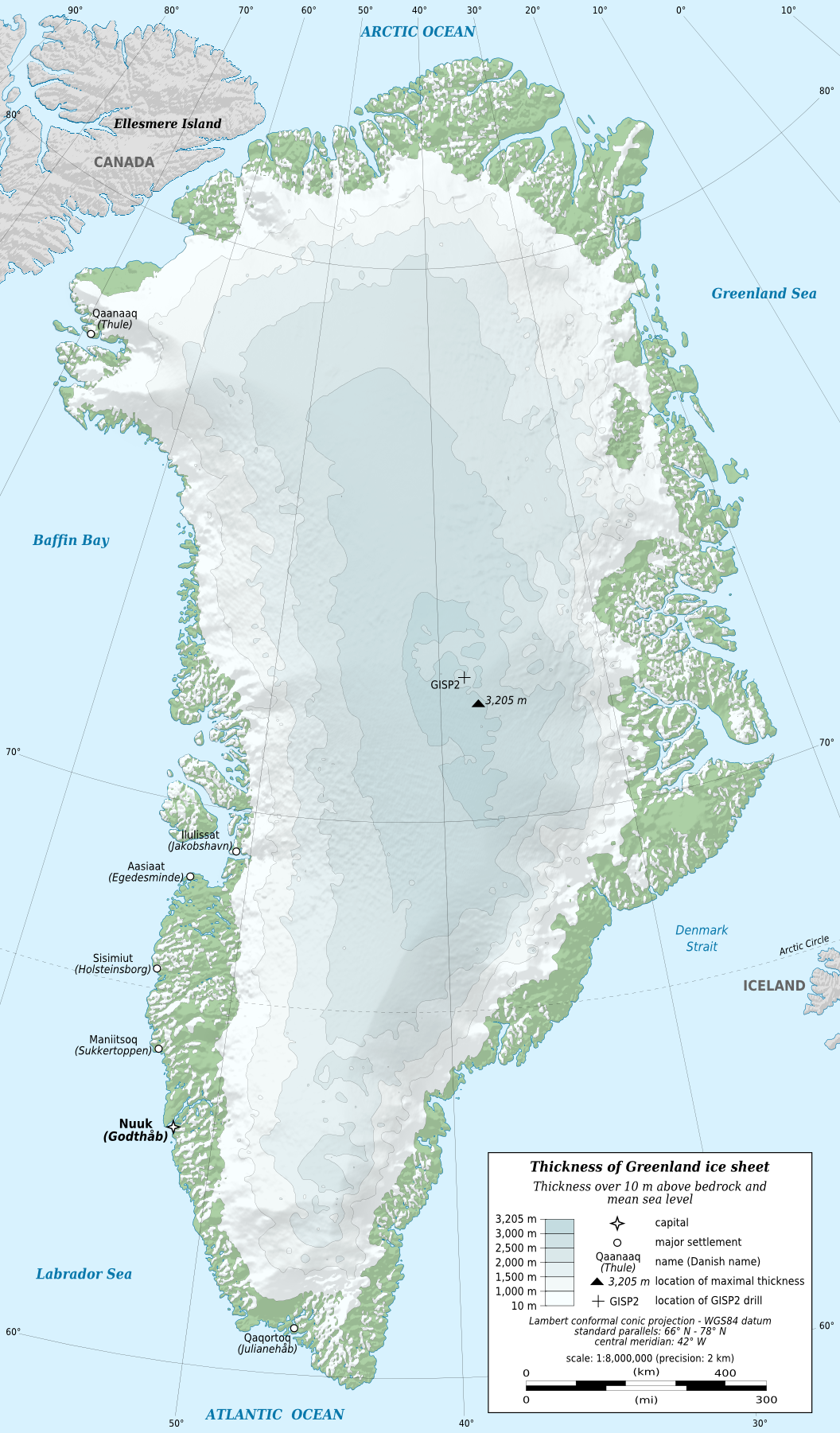

The Greenland ice sheet is an ice sheet which forms the second-largest body of ice in the world. It is an average of 1,673 m (5,489 ft) thick and over 3,488 m (11,444 ft) thick at its maximum. It is almost 2,900 kilometres (1,800 mi) long in a north–south direction, with a maximum width of 1,100 kilometres (680 mi) at a latitude of 77°N, near its northern edge. The ice sheet covers 1,700,000 square kilometres (656,000 sq mi), around 80% of the surface of Greenland, or about 12% of the area of the Antarctic ice sheet. The term 'Greenland ice sheet' is often shortened to GIS or GrIS in scientific literature.

If all 2,900,000 cubic kilometres (696,000 cu mi) of the ice sheet were to melt, it would increase global sea levels by ~7.4 m (24 ft). Global warming between 1.7 °C (3.1 °F) and 2.3 °C (4.1 °F) would likely make this melting inevitable. However, 1.5 °C (2.7 °F) would still cause ice loss equivalent to 1.4 m (4 1/2 ft) of sea level rise, and more ice will be lost if the temperatures exceed that level before declining. If global temperatures continue to rise, the ice sheet will likely disappear within 10,000 years. At very high warming, its future lifetime goes down to around 1,000 years. Beneath the Greenland ice sheet are mountains and lake basins.

The West Antarctic ice sheet is likely to melt completely unless temperatures are reduced by 2 °C (3.6 °F) below 2020 levels. The loss of that ice sheet would take between 500 and 13,000 years. A sea level rise of 3.3 m (10 ft 10 in) would occur if the ice sheet collapses, which would leave ice caps on the mountains, and a rise of 4.3 m (14 ft 1 in) would occur if those ice caps also melt. The far more stable East Antarctic ice sheet may cause a sea level rise of only 0.5 m (1 ft 8 in) to 0.9 m (2 ft 11 in) from the current level of warming, a small fraction of the 53.3 m (175 ft) contained in the full ice sheet. With global warming being around 3 °C (5.4 °F), vulnerable areas like Wilkes Basin and Aurora Basin may collapse over around 2,000 years, potentially adding up to 6.4 m (21 ft 0 in) to sea levels.

=== Decline of glaciers ===
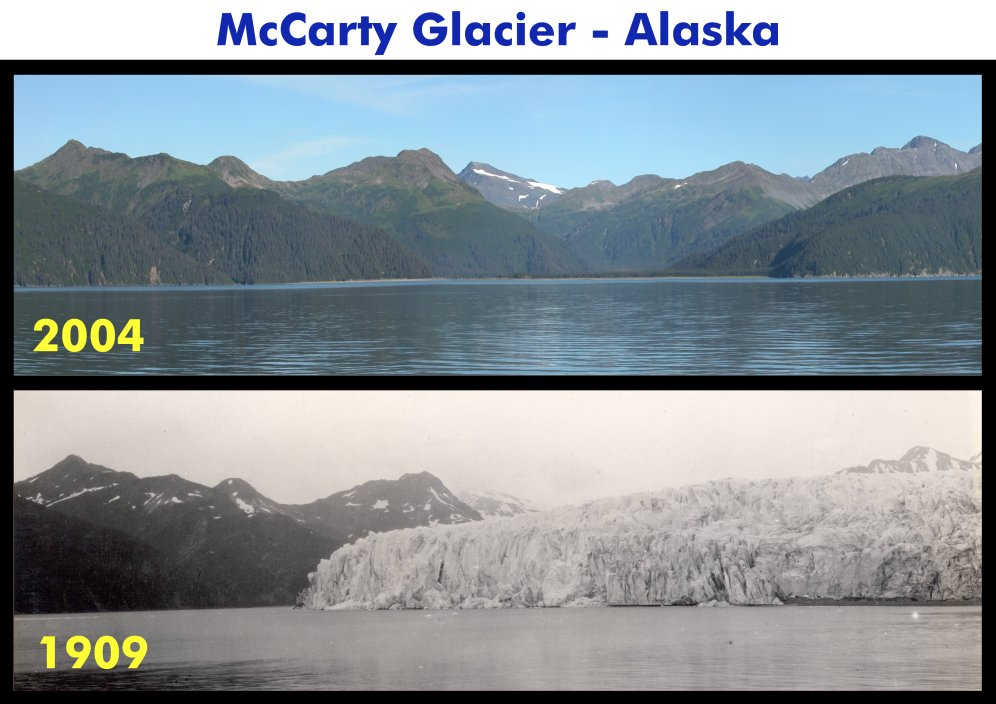
Alaska's McCarty Glacier retreated about 15 kilometres (9.3 mi) in less than a century, and dense, diverse vegetation has become established on the slopes.

The retreat of glaciers since 1850 is a well-documented effect of climate change. The retreat of mountain glaciers provides evidence for the rise in global temperatures since the late 19th century. Examples include mountain glaciers in western North America, Asia, the Alps in central Europe, and tropical and subtropical regions of South America and Africa. Since glacial mass is affected by long-term climatic changes, e.g. precipitation, mean temperature, and cloud cover, glacial mass changes are one of the most sensitive indicators of climate change. The retreat of glaciers is also a major reason for sea level rise. Excluding peripheral glaciers of ice sheets, the total cumulated global glacial losses over the 26 years from 1993 to 2018 were likely 5500 gigatons, or 210 gigatons per year.

On Earth, 99% of glacial ice is contained within vast ice sheets (also known as "continental glaciers") in the polar regions. Glaciers also exist in mountain ranges on every continent other than the Australian mainland, including Oceania's high-latitude oceanic island countries such as New Zealand. Glacial bodies larger than 50,000 km^{2} (19,000 sq mi) are called ice sheets. They are several kilometers deep and obscure the underlying topography.

=== Sea ice decline ===
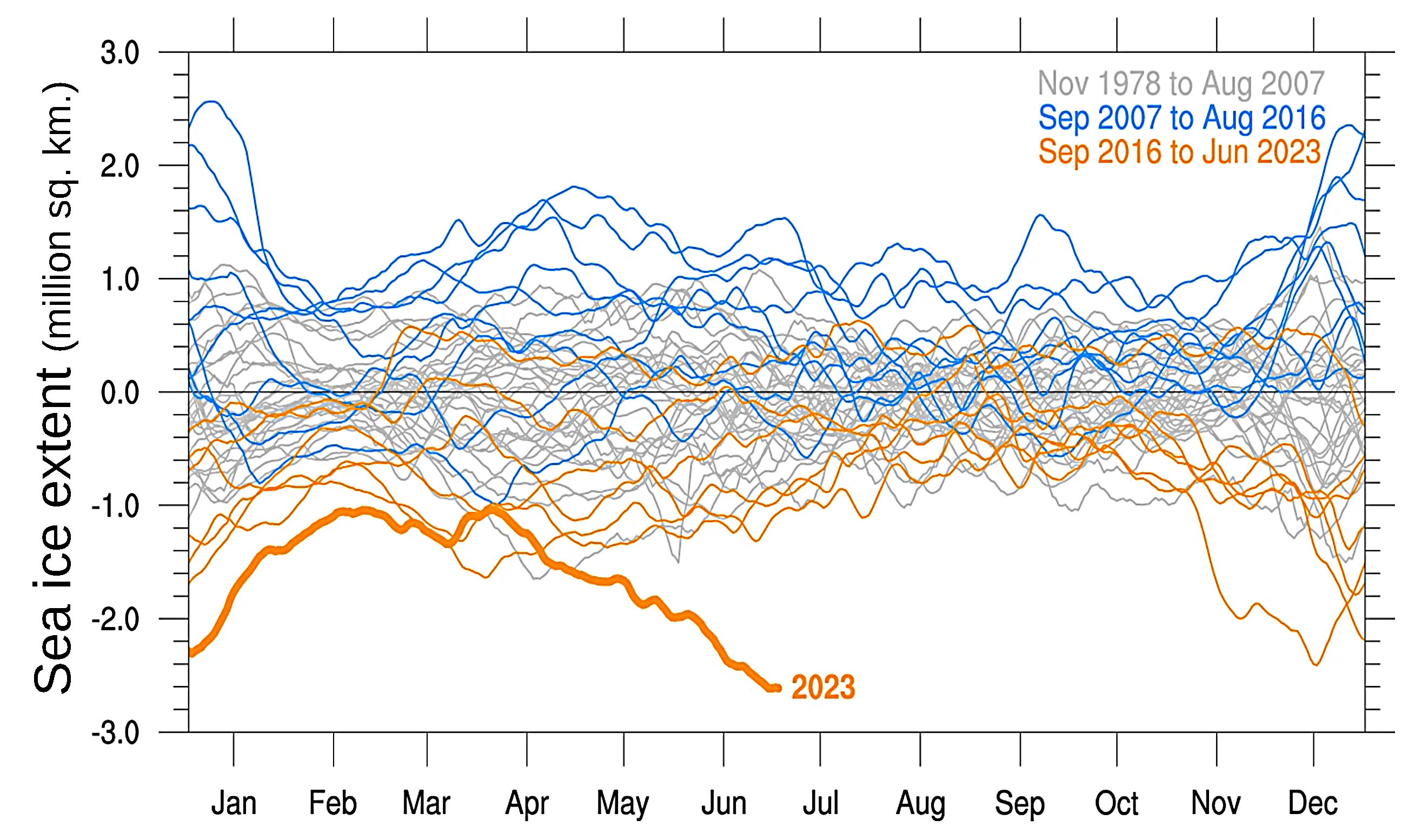
Reporting the reduction in Antarctic sea ice extent in mid 2023, researchers concluded that a "regime shift" may be taking place "in which previously important relationships no longer dominate sea ice variability".

Sea ice reflects 50% to 70% of the incoming solar radiation back into space. Only 6% of incoming solar energy is reflected by the ocean. As the climate warms, the area covered by snow or sea ice decreases. After sea ice melts, more energy is absorbed by the ocean, so it warms up. This ice-albedo feedback is a self-reinforcing feedback of climate change. Large-scale measurements of sea ice have only been possible since satellites came into use.

Sea ice in the Arctic has declined in recent decades in area and volume due to climate change. It has been melting more in summer than it refreezes in winter. The decline of sea ice in the Arctic has been accelerating during the early twenty-first century. It has a rate of decline of 4.7% per decade. It has declined over 50% since the first satellite records. Ice-free summers are expected to be rare at 1.5 °C (2.7 °F) degrees of warming. They are set to occur at least once every decade with a warming level of 2 °C (3.6 °F). The Arctic will likely become ice-free at the end of some summers before 2050.

Sea ice extent in Antarctica varies a lot year by year. This makes it difficult to determine a trend, and record highs and record lows have been observed between 2013 and 2023. The general trend since 1979, the start of the satellite measurements, has been roughly flat. Between 2015 and 2023, there has been a decline in sea ice, but due to the high variability, this does not correspond to a significant trend.

=== Permafrost thaw ===
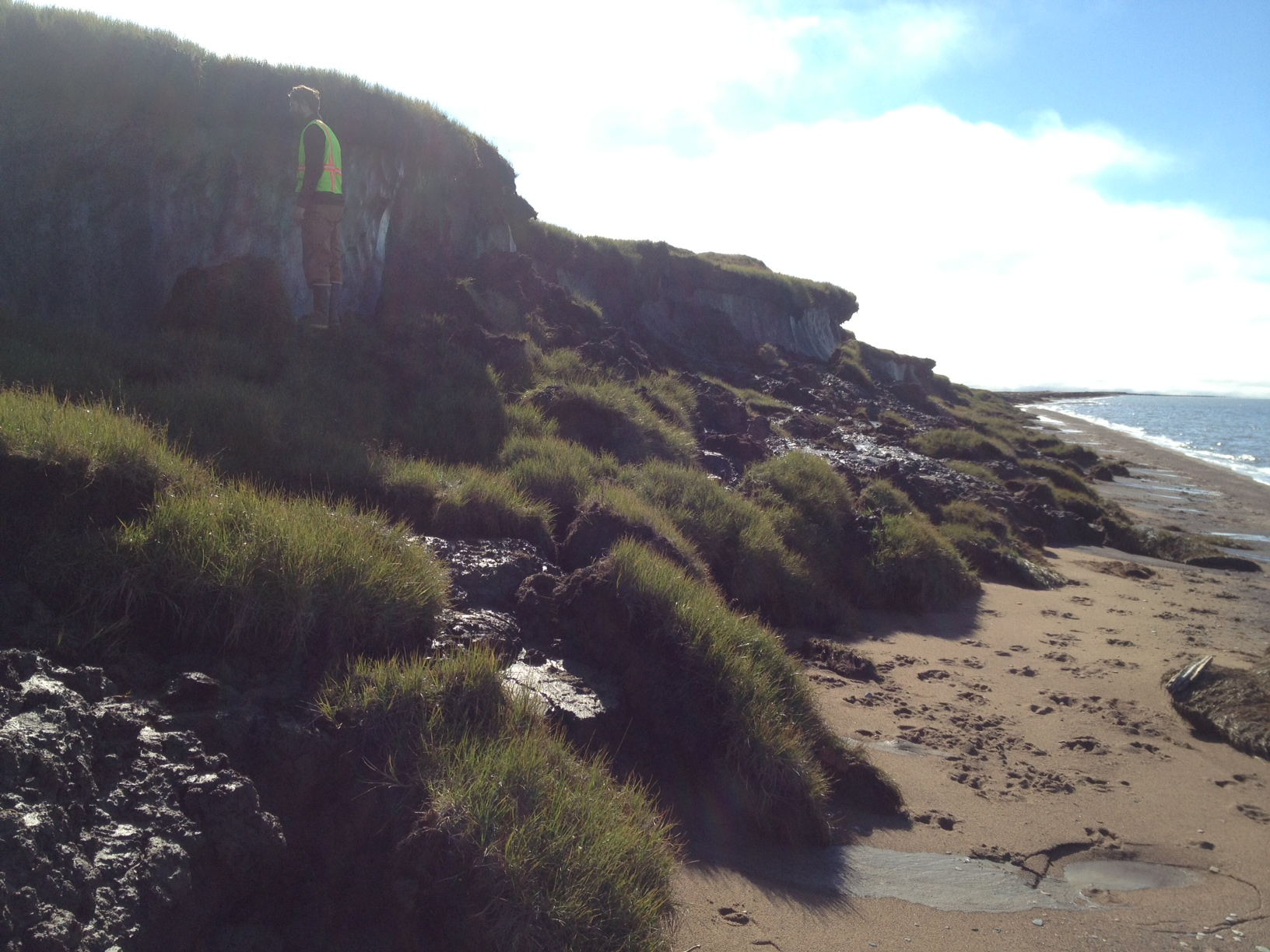
Recently thawed Arctic permafrost and coastal erosion on the Beaufort Sea, Arctic Ocean, near Point Lonely, Alaska in 2013.

=== Snow cover decrease ===
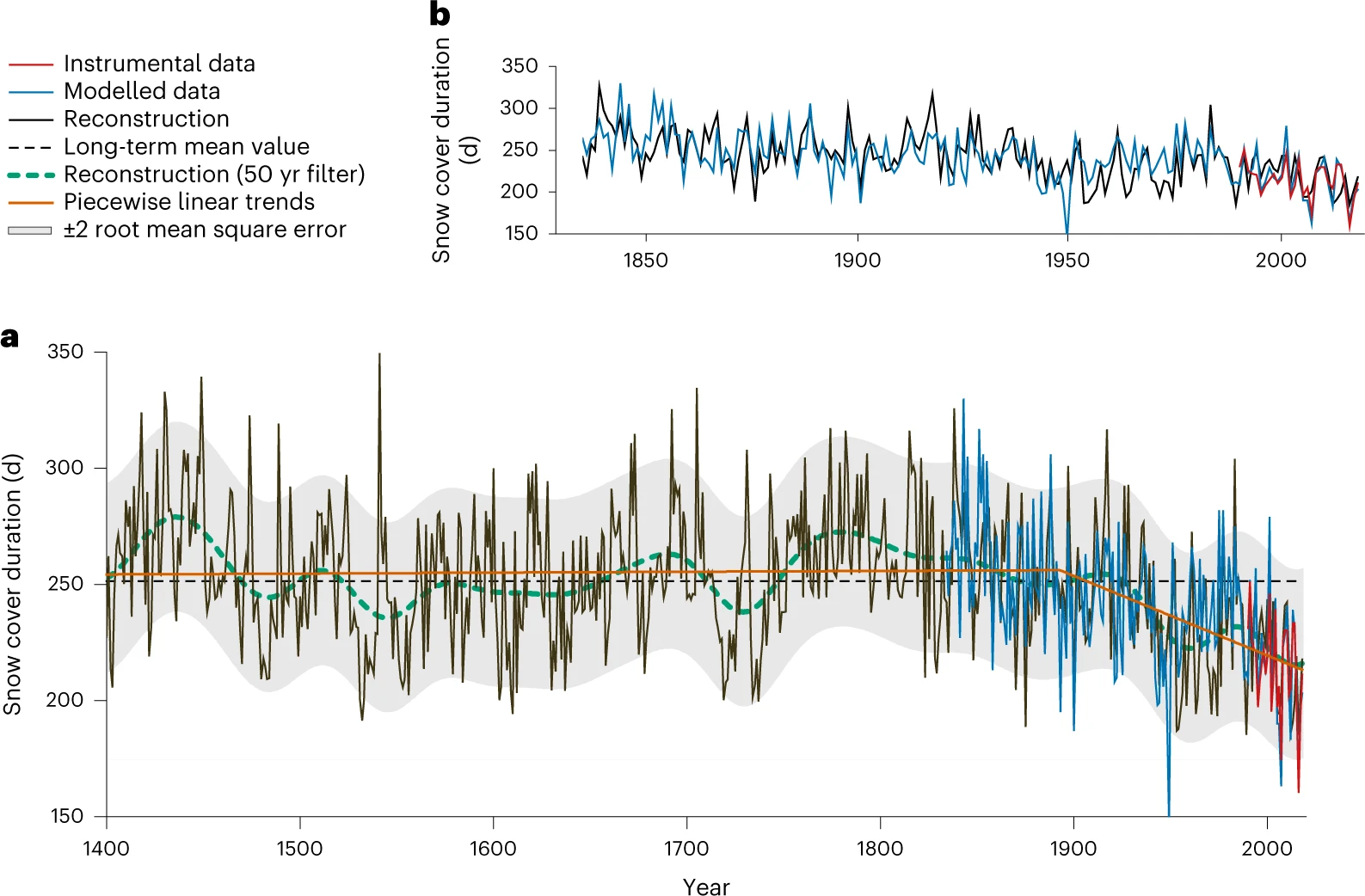
Shrinkage of snow cover duration in the Alps, starting ca. end of the 19th century, highlighting climate change adaptation needs

Studies in 2021 found that Northern Hemisphere snow cover has been decreasing since 1978, along with snow depth. Paleoclimate observations show that such changes are unprecedented over the last millennia in Western North America.

North American winter snow cover increased during the 20th century, largely in response to an increase in precipitation.

Global warming is expected to result in major changes to the partitioning of snow and rainfall, and to the timing of snowmelt, which will have important implications for water use and management. These changes also involve potentially important decadal and longer time-scale feedbacks to the climate system through temporal and spatial changes in soil moisture and runoff to the oceans.(Walsh 1995). Freshwater fluxes from the snow cover into the marine environment may be important, as the total flux is probably of the same magnitude as desalinated ridging and rubble areas of sea ice.

== See also ==
- Cryobiology
- International Association of Cryospheric Sciences (IACS)
- Polar regions of Earth
- Special Report on the Ocean and Cryosphere in a Changing Climate
- Water cycle
