= Michael Brandon Jones =

American geophysicist

- Education: Lincoln University; University of Delaware
- Scientific career
- Workplaces: United States Environmental Protection Agency; National Science Foundation
- Thesis: Settlement of brachyuran megalopae in Delaware Bay : an analysis of time series data (1994)

Michael Brandon Jones is an American geophysicist who is program director at the National Science Foundation. He has worked on the development of geosciences education. He took office as president of the American Geophysical Union in 2025.

== Early life and education ==
Jones was born in Ohio. He was an undergraduate student at Lincoln University and was an intern at the Chesapeake Bay Foundation, working on a research project analyzing the chemistry of the water in Chesapeake Bay. He moved to the University of Delaware for graduate research, where he specialized in marine studies. His research considered the physical mechanisms that drive the formation of crab patches in the Delaware Bay. During his PhD, Jones worked as a field coordinator for the University of Delaware Marine Advisory Service on various ocean missions, including a deep sea submarine cruise. He then spent one year as a contractor for the United States Environmental Protection Agency.

== Research and career ==
In 2004, Jones was appointed Global Ecology program manager for the United States Environmental Protection Agency. He held various leadership positions at the EPA, including overseeing the Office for Research and Development and the Environmental Innovation and Sustainable Education. He was responsible for the ESA Science to Achieve Results (STAR) Program, which supported research and education that would help address environmental issues in society.

Jones was made program director at the National Science Foundation in 2013. He has concentrated on developing research opportunities for research fellows, expanding geosciences education and improving representation. He leads the education team of the NSF Directorate for Geosciences, who research and report on best practice in geoscience education.

Jones was elected President of the American Geophysical Union in 2021.

== Awards and honors ==
- 2005 United States Environmental Protection Agency Suzanne E. Olive Award
- 2014 University of Delaware Presidential Award for Outstanding Achievement
- 2022 NASA Group Achievement Award GLOBE Program
