= McCarty Glacier =

Glacier in Alaska, United States

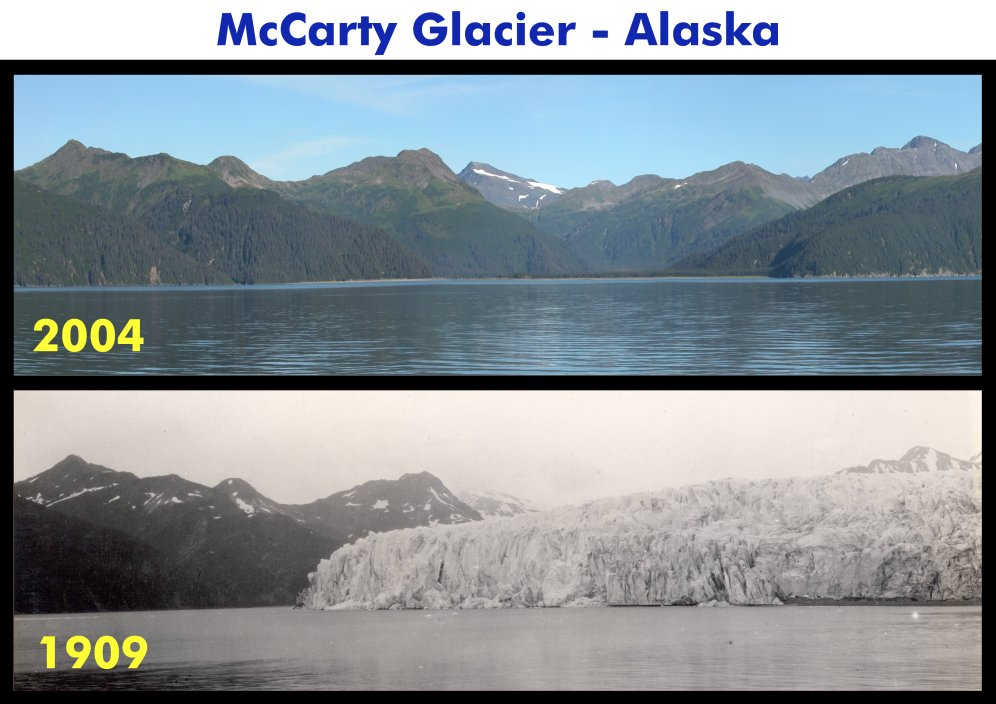
- Comparison of the size of McCarty Glacier in 1909 versus its size in 2004

- Location within Alaska
- Interactive map of McCarty Glacier
- Type: Tidewater glacier
- Location: Kenai Peninsula Borough, Alaska, U.S.
- Coordinates: 59°46′12″N 150°13′15″W
- Area: 15 miles^{2} (24.6 km^{2})
- Length: 10 m (33 ft)
- Terminus: McCarty Fiord
- Status: Retreating

The McCarty Glacier is a tidewater glacier located in the Harding Icefield in the Kenai Mountains of the Kenai Peninsula, Alaska.

The glacier is named for William McCarty, a former resident of Seward.

The glacier has been severely affected by global warming and since the early 1900s its terminus has receded 15 km from the mouth of the bay.

== See also ==
- List of glaciers and icefields
