= Niels Christian Brøgger =

Norwegian essayist, novelist, journalist and critic

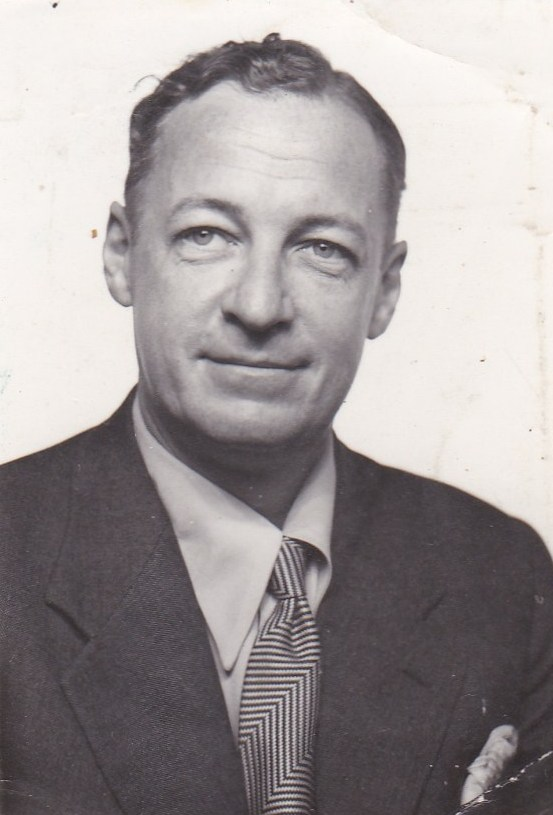
Niels Christian Brøgger (1954)

Niels Christian Ursin Brøgger (4 June 1914 – 17 August 1966) was a Norwegian essayist, novelist, journalist and critic.

He was born in Kristiania as a son of Anton Wilhelm Brøgger (1884–1951) and Inger Ursin (1882–1941). He was a great-grandson of the book printer Anton Wilhelm Brøgger, a grandson of geologist Waldemar Christofer Brøgger and a brother of writer Waldemar Christofer Brøgger. He was the uncle of anthropologist Jan Brøgger.

Brøgger studied the history of literature at the University of Oslo and in London. His first book was Den nye moral og andre essays, an essay collection released in 1934. In the same year he was hired as a critic in Tidens Tegn, a newspaper to which his father also contributed. His brother was hired as a journalist in 1937, and became a theatre critic the following year. Both brothers left Tidens Tegn in 1940.

During the occupation of Norway by Nazi Germany during World War II, Niels Brøgger was a member of the resistance movement. He was arrested by Gestapo in November 1942, and was held at Grini concentration camp from 3 November 1942 to 21 April 1943. Both his father and brother spent time at Grini as well.

After the war, in 1945, he was hired in the newspaper Nationen. He also contributed with pieces in Verdens Gang. In 1947 he released the essay collection Før uværet kom. Inntrykk fra 1930-årene. Artikler og essays together with his father. The 1952 release Korset og rosen was a study of Sigrid Undset's novels. He also wrote three books on pre-Christian mythology: Nordens demring. Nordiske myter og sagn (1949), Guder og helter i klassisk tid (1958) and Helter og halvguder hos kelterne (1961). He also wrote crime novels under the pseudonym Johnny W. Lambeth. His last published work was Sangenes sang, a translation of the Song of Songs. He died in August 1966, only 52 years old.
