= Arthur Francis Buddington =

American geologist

- Born: November 29, 1890; Wilmington, Delaware, United States
- Died: December 25, 1980 (aged 90); Quincy, Massachusetts, United States
- Education: Brown University; Princeton University
- Awards: Penrose Medal (1954); Roebling Medal (1956); U.S. Department of the Interior Distinguished Service Award
- Scientific career
- Fields: Geology
- Workplaces: Princeton University; U.S. Geological Survey; Brown University
- Thesis: Pre-Cambrian rocks of southeast Newfoundland (1916)
- Doctoral advisor: Charles Henry Smyth, Jr.
- Doctoral students: Harry Hammond Hess

Arthur Francis "Bud" Buddington (November 29, 1890 – December 25, 1980) was an American geologist. Born in Wilmington, Delaware, he grew up there and in West Mystic, Connecticut. He was educated at Brown University and Princeton University.

After short stints teaching at Brown and Princeton, serving in the Chemical Warfare Service during World War I, and researching at the Carnegie Institution for Science, Buddington settled at Princeton, where he taught for nearly 40 years. He chaired the Department of Geology from 1936 to 1950. He also had a long career with the U.S. Geological Survey (USGS), doing field work for that agency in Alaska, Oregon, and the northeastern United States.

Buddington was elected to the American Philosophical Society, the National Academy of Sciences, and the American Academy of Arts and Sciences. His years of work for the USGS earned him the Distinguished Service award of the U.S. Department of the Interior.

== Early life and education ==
Buddington was born November 29, 1890, in Wilmington, Delaware, to Mary Salina Buddington (née Wheeler) and Osmer G. Buddington. His parents' families had been in Connecticut since the 1600s, and he was descended from men who fought for the United States in the American Revolution. His father was a Baptist minister who supplemented his income by farming crops and raising chickens. In 1895 his mother died; his father later married Ella Turner. In 1904 the family relocated to West Mystic, Connecticut, where the father became the minister at a church in nearby Poquonock Bridge, Connecticut.

Arthur Buddington was educated in public schools of Wilmington, Mystic, and Westerly, Rhode Island. In 1908 he graduated from Westerly High School. He then matriculated at Brown University. After an unpleasant year in the liberal arts program, he switched to the sciences. He graduated second in his class in 1912 with a bachelor's degree in geology, chemistry, and physics. He was also elected to Sigma Xi in 1912.

After graduating Buddington remained at Brown to earn a Master of Science degree in 1913, writing a master's thesis on fossiliferous Carboniferous shales that had recently been discovered on College Hill, on which Brown is situated. That same year he enrolled in graduate school at Princeton University to study under Charles Henry Smyth, Jr., who was doing some of the first work in chemical petrology (using chemistry to study ordinary rocks rather than minerals) in the United States. Buddington earned his Ph.D. from Princeton in 1916.

== Career ==
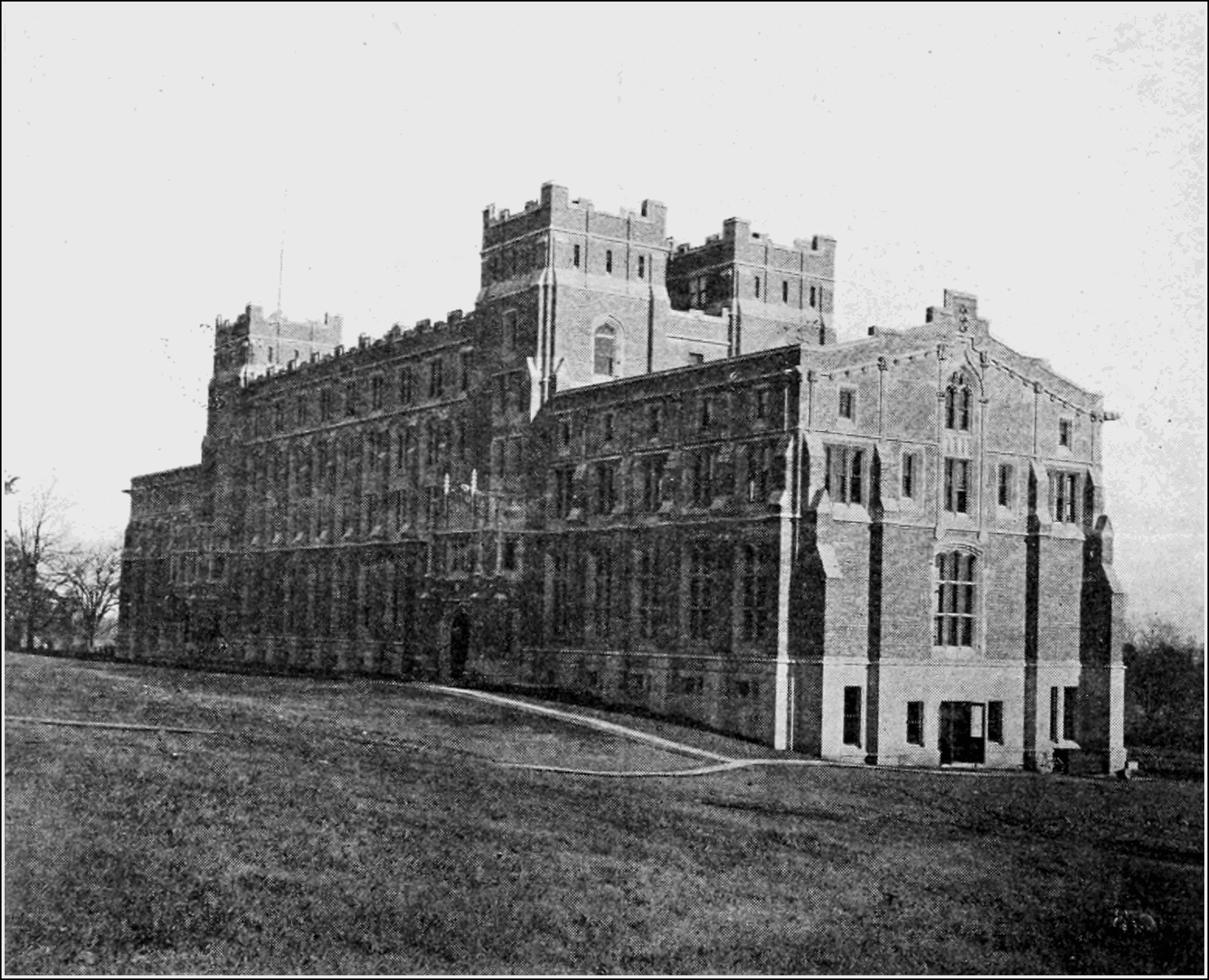
Since 1909 Guyot Hall has housed the Princeton University Department of Geology, where Buddington was a Ph.D. student, a professor, and department chair.

After earning his Ph.D. Buddington had a series of brief appointments. He was first a postdoctoral fellow at Princeton, but in 1917 he took a position teaching at Brown. In early 1918, with World War I raging, he returned to Princeton to teach military aerial observation in its aviation ground school. Specifically he taught map-reading, range-finding, and telegraphy. In April he enlisted as a private in the U.S. Army's Signal Corps. He trained briefly as an aerial observer and photo interpreter before being reassigned to the Chemical Warfare Service, where he did research under Richard C. Tolman. He was discharged at war's end in 1919 as a sergeant first class and then returned to Brown once again to teach. Later that year he joined the Geophysical Laboratory of the Carnegie Institution for Science in Washington, D.C.

In 1920 Buddington was appointed assistant professor at Princeton, where he remained until retiring in 1959. He put a great emphasis on teaching. Each year he gave a senior-level undergraduate course in petrology and one graduate course in petrology or chemical geology. As chair of the Department of Geology from 1936 to 1950, he built Princeton's reputation in petrology and studies of ore in addition to its traditional strength in paleontology. Harry Hammond Hess and John Tuzo Wilson were among his students.

Buddington also had a long association with the U.S. Geological Survey (USGS). He spent the summers from 1921 to 1925 producing geological maps of southeastern Alaska. The summer of 1930 was devoted to mapping Oregon portions of the Cascade Range. In 1943 the USGS appointed him head of what would become a 17-year field project on the iron ores of the northeastern United States. This large collaboration produced some important scientific results and identified several economically compelling ore deposits.

=== Awards and honors ===
- 1931 – elected to the American Philosophical Society
- 1943 – elected to the National Academy of Sciences
- 1947 – elected to the American Academy of Arts and Sciences
- 1954 – Penrose Medal of the Geological Society of America
- 1956 – Roebling Medal of the Mineralogical Society of America
- 1963 – Distinguished Service Award of the United States Department of the Interior

Buddington held honorary degrees from Brown, Franklin and Marshall College, and the University of Liège.

=== Professional service ===
- 1942 – President of the Mineralogical Society of America
- 1943 and 1947 – Vice President of the Geological Society of America
- 1954–57 – Chairman of the Geology Section of the National Academy of Sciences

== Later life and legacy ==
Despite formally retiring in 1959, Buddington remained active. That same year he was named Elmer Bair Professor of Geology, and he published 23 papers in the following years. He died December 25, 1980, in Quincy, Massachusetts, and was buried in Princeton.

Buddingtonite is named in his honor.

== Personal life ==
During his time at the Geophysical Laboratory, Buddington met Jene Elizabeth Muntz, originally of David City, Nebraska. They married in 1924 and remained married until her death in 1975. She played an important role in his field work: he had never learned to drive a car, so she drove him through the Adirondacks. They had one child, a daughter.
