= Anton Wilhelm Brøgger =

Norwegian archaeologist and politician (1884–1951)

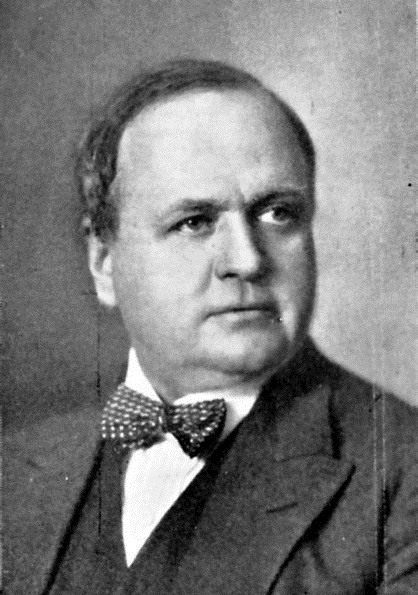
Anton Wilhelm Brøgger

Anton Wilhelm Brøgger (11 October 1884 – 29 August 1951) was a Norwegian archaeologist and politician.

== Personal life ==
He was born in Stockholm as a son of professor of geology Waldemar Christofer Brøgger (1851–1940) and Antonie Scheel Siewers (1854–1933). He was a grandson of the book printer Anton Wilhelm Brøgger.

In September 1909 he married Inger Ursin (1882–1941). He had the sons Waldemar Christofer Brøgger (1911–1991) and Niels Christian Brøgger (1914–1966), and through the former, the grandson Jan Brøgger.

== Career ==
Brøgger finished his secondary education in 1903, but his higher education was sporadic. Without a formal examination, he wrote the paper Øxer av Nøstvettypen, which was published in 1905 by the Norwegian Geological Survey. He participated in the archaeological investigations of Svarthola outside Stavanger, and wrote a report on the first paleolithic kitchen midden found in Norway, published in the Annals of Stavanger Museum for 1907. Already in 1909 he completed his Dr.philos. degree with the thesis Den arktiske stenalder i Norge (The Arctic Stone Age in Norway). From 1909 to 1913 he worked as a curator at Stavanger Museum. He wrote a book on the city's medieval history and founded the local branch of the Society for the Preservation of Ancient Norwegian Monuments. He also became involved in Stavanger Aftenblad and contributed to Dagbladet and Tidens Tegn.

He was hired at Universitetets Oldsaksamling at the Royal Frederick University in 1913, and became its director and a professor in 1915. He also contributed via the Institute for Comparative Research in Human Culture, and was a driving force in establishing the Viking Ship Museum. From 1918 to 1934 he chaired Norske Museers Landsforbund, a forerunner of Norges Museumsforbund. He edited the journals Oldtiden, St. Hallvard and Acta Archaeologica, and was also a co-editor for volumes seven through ten of the biographical dictionary Norsk biografisk leksikon. He contributed to the encyclopedia Salmonsens Konversationsleksikon, where he wrote the chapter on the prehistory of Norway. Among his most important works is Ertog og øre (1921), where he combined archeological findings with law texts from the Gulating and Frostating. He wanted to become rector of the university, but this did not happen. His father had been rector from 1907 to 1911.

Brøgger was involved in politics as well—again like his father. He became a deputy central board member of the Liberal Left Party in 1929, and advanced to deputy chairman already in 1930. The elected chairman, Karl Wefring, was not able to function, and Brøgger was therefore acting party chairman until 1931. He then continued as a central board member until 1933, then a deputy member. Representing the constituency of Oslo, he served as a deputy representative to the Parliament of Norway during the 1928–1930 term, and participated in sessions of the Standing Committee on Finance in May 1928 and April 1930. In 1930 he headed the party ballot, above Ragna Hørbye. Neither was elected. He was a member of the Norwegian Association for Women's Rights.

Brøgger was a member of the Committee for Cultural War Preparedness (Norwegian: Komiteen for kulturell krigsberedskap), established in 1938 under supervision of the Director for Cultural Heritage, Harry Fett. Shortly after the Second World War broke out in 1939, Brøgger initiated a rescue operation to save the most important items from Oldsaksamlingen, which were secretly evacuated and placed in a bank safe at Fagernes.

Brøgger was also a board member of the National Theatre. In 1941, during World War II and the occupation of Norway by Nazi Germany, the National Theatre board at one point did not abide by the directions of the Nazi government. Several board members were arrested, including Brøgger, who was first suppleant to the board. Unlike the ordinary board members Harald Grieg, Johannes Sejersted Bødtker and Francis Bull, he was not sent to Grini concentration camp, but was held at the prison on Åkebergveien between 28 June and his release on 2 July. However, Brøgger was arrested for a second time in September 1941, together with fellow academics Otto Lous Mohr and Didrik Arup Seip. He spent from 11 to 30 September in the prison at Møllergata 19, and then was at Grini until 22 October 1942. Both his sons spent time at Grini as well.

Brøgger was a member of the Norwegian Academy of Science and Letters from 1914 and the Royal Norwegian Society of Sciences and Letters from 1927, and was decorated with the Order of St. Olav in 1932. He was a co-founder of the Norwegian Archaeological Society, and served as secretary-general until his death. He was declared an honorary member of Norske Museers Landsforbund. Brøgger's health declined during his time in the concentration camp. After the war he returned as a professor, but retired in 1949. His last publication of importance came in 1950: Vikingeskipene. Deres forgjengere og etterfølgere (The Viking Ships: Their Predecessors and Successors), written together with Haakon Shetelig. He died in August 1951. A street in Stavanger, Anton Brøggers gate, is named after him.
