= Waldemar Brøgger =

Waldemar Brøgger may refer to:

- Waldemar Christofer Brøgger (geologist) (1851–1940), Norwegian geologist
- Waldemar Christofer Brøgger (writer) (1911–1991), Norwegian writer
