= Charles Henry Smyth Jr. =

American geologist (1866–1937)

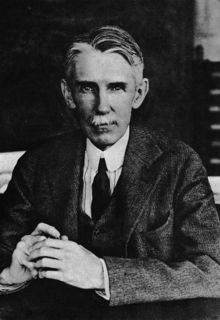
- Born: March 31, 1866; Oswego, New York, United States
- Died: April 4, 1937 (aged 71); Princeton, New Jersey, United States
- Education: Columbia University
- Children: Charles Phelps Smyth; Henry DeWolf Smyth
- Scientific career
- Fields: Geology
- Workplaces: Hamilton College; Princeton University
- Thesis: The Origin of the Clinton Type of Iron Ore (1890)
- Doctoral advisor: James Furman Kemp; Nathaniel Shaler
- Other academic advisors: Harry Rosenbusch
- Doctoral students: Arthur Francis Buddington

Charles Henry Smyth Jr. (/smaɪθ/; March 31, 1866 – April 4, 1937) was an American geologist. Born to a prominent family in Upstate New York, he studied geology at Columbia University before becoming a professor of geology at Hamilton College and Princeton University. At Princeton he strengthened the Department of Geology's graduate program.

Smyth specialized in petrology, chemical geology, and economic geology. He showed the sedimentary origin of iron ore deposits near his native Clinton, New York, mapped the geology of the western Adirondack Mountains, and published a well known monograph on the origins of alkaline igneous rocks. He was a fellow of the American Association for the Advancement of Science, a member of the American Philosophical Society, and a fellow of the Geological Society of America.

== Family ==
Smyth was born March 31, 1866, in Oswego, New York, the second son of Alice DeWolf Smyth and Charles Henry Smyth Sr. In 1873, he moved with his family to nearby Clinton, New York. His mother belonged to a well known Oswego banking and manufacturing family. His father was a prominent local businessman, holding executive positions at the Franklin Iron Works, Clinton Bank, and the company that managed the Niagara Falls Suspension Bridge. He also served on the vestry of the local Episcopal church and was a brigadier general in the New York Guard. The family was considered among the local elite in Clinton. Katharine Blunt was a first cousin.

On July 30, 1891, the younger Charles Smyth married Ruth Anne Phelps, originally of Shreveport, Louisiana. They had two children, Charles Phelps Smyth (1895–1990) and Henry DeWolf Smyth (1898–1986). Both became professors of science at Princeton University.

== Education ==
Smyth studied at Clinton Grammar School in his youth. He became interested in geology at a young age: his native region of Upstate New York had many fossils, and his family's business involved extracting the local iron ore. In 1884, he entered Hamilton College in Clinton, where he studied science. After a year he transferred to the School of Mines at Columbia University. At Columbia he was president of the Glee Club. He graduated in 1888 as one of the top three students in his class.

Smyth continued his studies at Cornell University under James Furman Kemp and Harvard University under Nathaniel Shaler. He also worked as an analytical chemist at the Franklin Iron Works, his father's company. He earned his Ph.D. in geology from Columbia in 1890, writing a dissertation titled "The Origin of the Clinton Type of Iron Ore". He then spent an additional year studying petrology at Heidelberg University under Harry Rosenbusch, the world expert in the field.

== Career ==
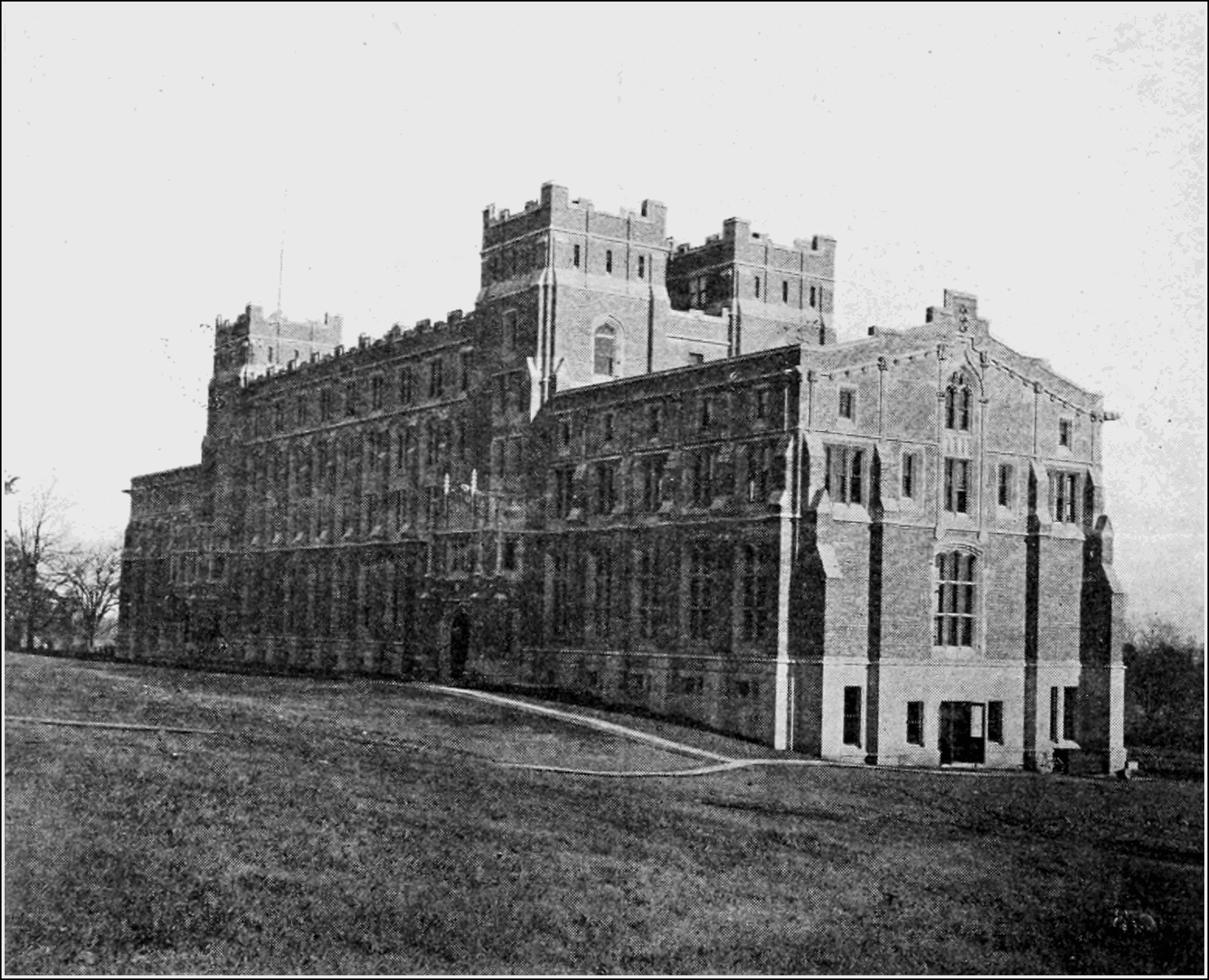
Since 1909 Guyot Hall has housed the Princeton University Department of Geology, where Smyth taught 1905–34.

In 1891 Smyth returned to Hamilton College to become the Stone Professor of Natural History. In addition to his teaching duties at Hamilton, Smyth spent each summer from 1892 to 1903 doing field work for the New York State Museum in the western Adirondack Mountains, which had been studied very little in the fifty years prior. He collaborated with his old advisor Kemp, who specialized in the eastern Adirondacks, and Henry Platt Cushing, who claimed the northern and northeastern sections. He returned to field work a final time in 1908; ill health prevented further expeditions.

In 1905 Woodrow Wilson, then President of Princeton University, convinced Smyth to join the Princeton faculty, where Smyth remained until retiring in 1934. He strengthened the graduate program in the Department of Geology, which awarded only two advanced degrees before 1912; during his 29 years, another 31 degrees were awarded. Among his students were Arthur Francis Buddington and Albert Orion Hayes. His courses in petrology and chemical geology introduced students to subjects that were relatively new in the United States.

Smyth was a fellow of the American Association for the Advancement of Science, a member of the American Philosophical Society, and a fellow of the Geological Society of America. He was also a member of the Society of Economic Geologists, the American Institute of Mining and Metallurgical Engineers, the Washington Academy of Sciences, Phi Beta Kappa, and Sigma Xi.

== Research ==
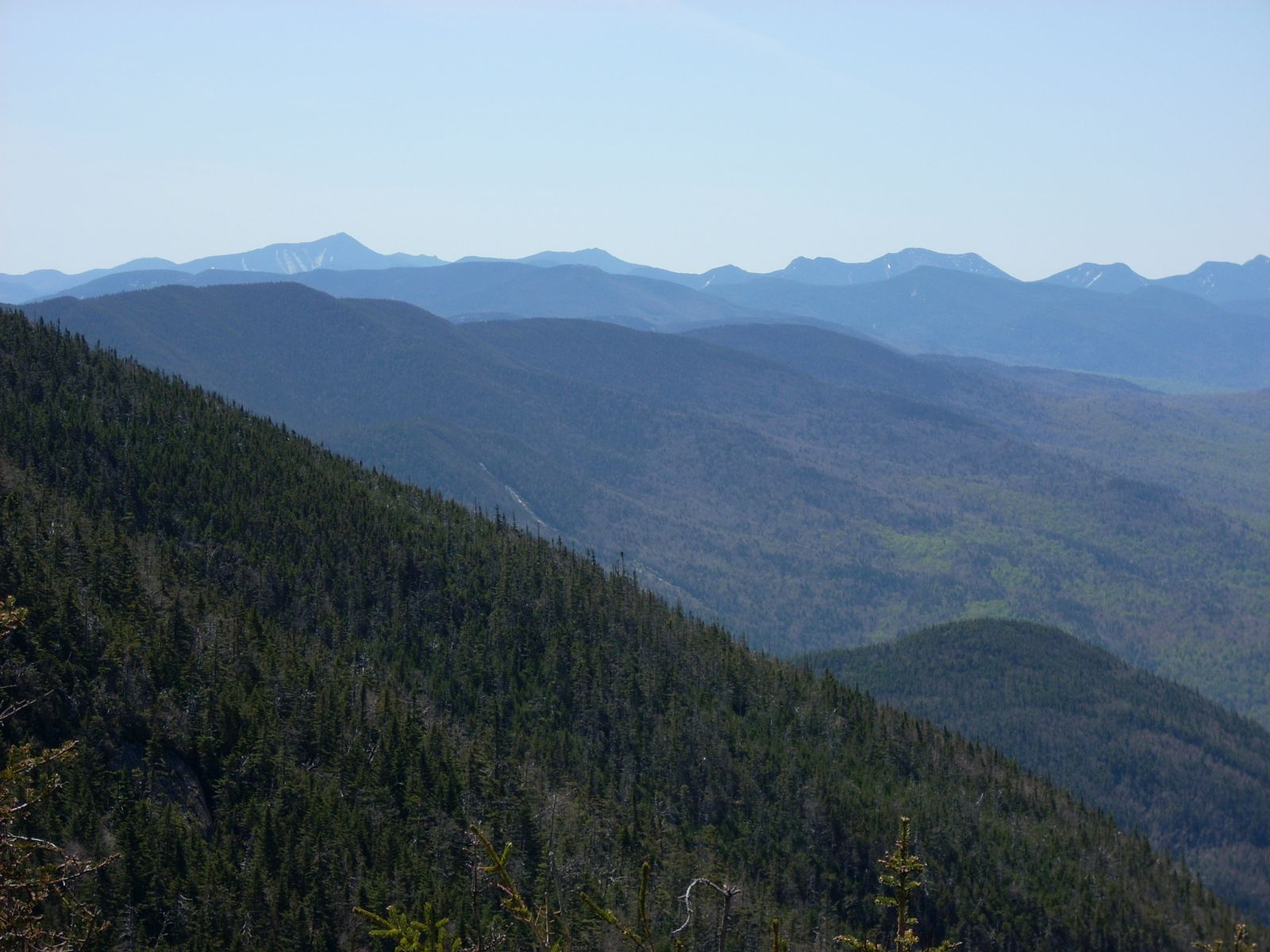
The Adirondack Mountains, where Smyth did much of his research.

Smyth's research was in the subfields of petrology, chemical geology, and economic geology. When he began his research most American geologists who used chemistry were mineralogists, volcanologists, or specialists in ore. Smyth was a pioneer in chemical petrology, applying chemistry to ordinary rocks, in the United States.

In his dissertation he argued that the iron ore near Clinton was a primary sediment; at the time the deposits were believed to be secondary nodules formed by replacement of primary limestone. His Princeton graduate student Hayes proved a similar result about the iron ores of his native Wabana, Newfoundland and Labrador. In 1919, Smyth showed that a green mineral in the Clinton ores was chamosite and also a primary sediment.

Smyth, Kemp, and Cushing's field work in the Adirondacks yielded detailed geological maps of the challenging region. Smyth described the nature and origins of the area's rocks and mineral deposits. His conclusions were still largely accepted at the time of his death in 1937.

His two best known contributions were his work on the Clinton iron ore and a 1927 monograph about the origins of alkaline igneous rocks.

== Later life and legacy ==
In his later years Smyth suffered from poor health, which an obituary in Princeton Alumni Weekly blamed on "overwork in certain rugged inaccessible wilderness portions of the Adirondacks." He contracted tonsillitis during his 1898 expedition to the Adirondacks and suffered heart and digestive troubles thereafter. He died April 4, 1937, at Princeton Hospital. The cause was pneumonia and complications from a recent hip fracture.

The mineral smythite is named after him. Its properties resemble those of pyrrhotite samples Smyth studied in Upstate New York.

== Bibliography ==
- Smyth, C. H. Jr. (June 1892). "On the Clinton iron ore". American Journal of Science. 3. 43 (258): 487–96. Bibcode:1892AmJS...43..487S. doi:10.2475/ajs.s3-43.258.487. S2CID 131123147.
- Smyth, C. H. Jr. (1927). "The genesis of alkaline rocks". Proceedings of the American Philosophical Society. 66: 535–80.
