= Waldemar Christofer Brøgger (writer) =

Norwegian novelist, journalist, translator and editor

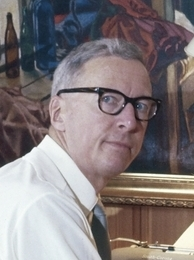
- Waldemar Christofer Brøgger in 1964
- Born: 5 December 1911; Stavanger, Norway
- Died: 14 August 1991 (aged 79)
- Occupation: Novelist
- Spouses: Elin Amalie Thon (m. 1933–1941); Mai Lindegård (m. 1942–1948); Enid Wesenlund (m. 1948–1976)
- Children: 3
- Relatives: Anton Wilhelm Brøgger (father); Niels Christian Brøgger (brother)
- Writing career
- Period: 1932-1985
- Genres: crime fiction, historical novels

Waldemar Christofer Brøgger (5 December 1911 – 14 August 1991) was a Norwegian novelist, journalist, translator and editor.

== Personal life ==
He was born in Stavanger as a son of Anton Wilhelm Brøgger (1884–1951) and Inger Ursin (1882–1941). He was a great-grandson of the book printer Anton Wilhelm Brøgger, a grandson of geologist Waldemar Christofer Brøgger and a brother of writer Niels Christian Brøgger.

Between 1933 and 1941 he was married to Elin Amalie Thon, and between 1942 and 1948 he was married to Mai Lindegård. Finally, between 1948 and 1976 he was married to nurse Enid Wesenlund. He is the father of the geneticist Anton Brøgger, born 1934, the anthropologist Jan Brøgger, born 1936 and Inger Vibeke Brøgger Langfeldt, born 1940.

== Career ==
Brøgger took his examen artium in 1930, and took the examen philosophicum at the Royal Frederick University before taking up a career in writing. His début novel was Den evige vilje ('The Eternal Will', 1932). In the following years he lived in London, Capri, Paris and Berlin, but he moved back to Norway in 1937 due to the harsh political climate. He was hired as a journalist in Tidens Tegn, to which he previously had contributed from abroad. He became a theatre critic in 1938, but resigned in 1940.

During the Norwegian Campaign, as a part of World War II, he participated in the armed resistance that followed the German invasion. During the subsequent occupation of Norway by Nazi Germany he joined the civil resistance. He was arrested by the Nazi authorities on 15 September 1941. After spending five days at Møllergata 19, he sat at Grini concentration camp until 14 March 1942. Both his father and brother spent time at Grini as well. After his release, Brøgger fled to Sweden in 1943. Here he published books under the pseudonyms Carsten Frogner and Peter Valentin. The book Den osynliga fronten ('The Invisible Front', 1943) became controversial, as it was published in German language in Switzerland, and information in it could be used to crack down on Norwegian resistance fighters. Brøgger was acquitted during the legal purge in Norway after World War II, but sharply criticized in the Norwegian Authors' Union.

Nonetheless, Brøgger continued his writing career, releasing mainly historical novels and crime novels. He translated dozens of books to Norwegian, including One Thousand and One Nights which was released in six volumes in 1950. He edited or contributed to the encyclopedias Cappelens ettbindsleksikon (1955), Gyldendals navneleksikon (1958), Combi. Visuelt leksikon (1969–1970), Refleks leksikon (1972), and Cappelens leksikon (1983–1985). He worked for the publishing house J.W. Cappelens Forlag in this period. In his older days he retreated to Tjøme, where he died in August 1991.
