= Longwell =

Longwell is a surname. Notable people with the surname include:

- Chester Ray Longwell (1887–1975), American geologist
- Gary Longwell (born 1971), Irish international rugby player
- Jeff Longwell (born 1960), American politician and businessman
- John Longwell (1883 – ?), American football player, football and basketball coach, and dentist
- Mark Longwell (born 1960), American soccer player
- Ryan Longwell (born 1974), American football player
- Sarah Longwell, American political strategist and publisher
