= William O. Baker =

American chemist (1915–2005)

William Oliver Baker
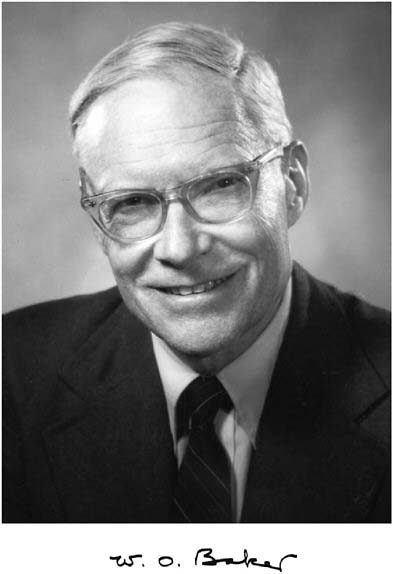

5th President of Bell Labs
- In office 1973–1979
- Preceded by: James Brown Fisk
- Succeeded by: Ian Munro Ross

Personal details
- Born: July 15, 1915 Chestertown, Maryland
- Died: October 31, 2005 (aged 90) Chatham, New Jersey
- Spouse: Frances Burrill (m. 1941; died 1999)
- Education: Washington College (B.S.); Princeton University (Ph.D.)

William Oliver Baker (July 15, 1915 – October 31, 2005) was president of Bell Labs from 1973 to 1979 and advisor on scientific matters to five United States presidents.

== Biography ==
He was born on July 15, 1915, in Chestertown, Maryland.

He received his degree from Washington College and went on to get a doctorate from Princeton University, studying under Charles Phelps Smyth. He later did research for Bell Labs that helped lead to synthetic rubber. He held 11 patents in all. He headed Bell Labs from 1973 to 1979. Prior to being named president, he had served as Bell Labs Vice President for Research since 1955. Baker had lived in the New Vernon section of Harding Township and was a longtime resident of Morristown, New Jersey.

In 1979, he was a resident of Morristown, NJ upon his tenure ending as President of Bell Labs.

He died of heart failure on October 31, 2005, in Chatham, New Jersey.

== Awards and honors ==
- Member of the United States National Academy of Sciences (1961)
- Perkin Medal (1963)
- Member of the American Philosophical Society (1963)
- Fellow of the American Academy of Arts and Sciences (1965)
- Priestley Medal (1966)
- IRI Medal from the Industrial Research Institute (1970)
- American Institute of Chemists Gold Medal (1975)
- Charles Lathrop Parsons Award, American Chemical Society (1976)
- Miles Conrad Award, NFAIS (1977)
- Willard Gibbs Award (1978)
- Vannevar Bush Award (1981)
- SASA Medal of Achievement (1984) Thereafter known as the William Oliver Baker Award
- National Medal of Science (1988)
- Benjamin Franklin Medal for Distinguished Achievement in the Sciences of the American Philosophical Society (2000).
- AAAS Philip Hauge Abelson Prize (1995)
- Marconi Society (2003)
