= Barbara Dutrow =

American geologist

Barbara Lee Dutrow
- Born: 1956 (age 69–70)
- Education: Southern Methodist University; Chadron State College
- Scientific career
- Workplaces: Louisiana State University
- Thesis: A staurolite trilogy : 1. Lithium in staurolite and its petrologic significance. 2. An experimental determination of the upper stability of staurolite plus quartz. 3. Evidence for multiple metamorphic episodes in the Farmington Quadrangle, Maine (1985)

Barbara Dutrow (born 1956) is an American geologist who is the Adolphe G. Gueymard Professor of Geology at Louisiana State University. Dutrow wrote the textbook Manual of Mineral Science. Also, she was elected President of the Geological Society of America in 2021.

== Early life and education ==
Dutrow is from Chadron, Nebraska. Her father was a General Motors dealer. She has stated that she developed an interest in geology at a young age, and collected purple quartz from Lake McConaughy. She was an undergraduate student at Chadron State College. She moved to Texas for graduate studies, joining the Southern Methodist University and working on vertebrate palaeontology. Dutrow remained at the Southern Methodist University for her doctoral studies, switching her focus to vertebrate paleontology and pleistocene mammoth assemblage. She was appointed an Alexander von Humboldt Foundation Fellow at the University of Münster Institut für Mineralogie. After her return in 1989 to the United States, Dutrow was appointed a research associate at the University of Arizona.

== Research and career ==
Dutrow joined Louisiana State University as an assistant professor, and was promoted to the Adolphe G. Gueymard Professor in 2002. In 2009 she was elected president of the Mineralogical Society of America, and has remained on the executive committee since.

In 2020, the International Mineralogical Association named a newly discovered mineral in her honour, Dutrowite. The mineral, Na(Fe^{2+}_{2.5}Ti_{0.5})Al_{6}(Si_{6}O_{18})(BO_{3})_{3}(OH)_{3}O, was discovered in the Apuan Alps and formed from the metamorphism of Rhyolite. Of the many tourmaline species, Dutrowite is the only one to be named after a woman. She was elected President of the Geological Society of America in 2021.

== Awards and honors ==
- 2002 Elected Fellow of the Geological Society of America
- 2007 Elected Fellow of the Mineralogical Society of America
- 2009 Chadron State College Distinguished Alumni Award
- 2021 Elected President of the Geological Society of America

== Selected publications ==
- D. J. Henry; M. Novak; F. C. Hawthorne; A. Ertl; B. L. Dutrow; P. Uher; F. Pezzotta (2011). "Nomenclature of the tourmaline-supergroup minerals" (PDF). American Mineralogist. 96 (5–6): 895–913, 895-913. Bibcode:2011AmMin..96..895H. doi:10.2138/am.2011.3636. ISSN 0003-004X. Wikidata Q55899800.
- Henry, D.J.; Dutrow, B.L. (2012). "Tourmaline at diagenetic to low-grade metamorphic conditions: Its petrologic applicability". Lithos. 154: 16–32. doi:10.1016/j.lithos.2012.08.013. ISSN 0024-4937.
- Holdaway, M. J.; Mukhopadhyay, Biswajit; Dyar, M. D.; Guidotti, C. V.; Dutrow, B. L. (1997-06-01). "Garnet-biotite geothermometry revised; new Margules parameters and a natural specimen data set from Maine". American Mineralogist. 82 (5–6): 582–595. doi:10.2138/am-1997-5-618. ISSN 0003-004X. S2CID 56269990.

=== Books ===
- Klein, Cornelis (2008). The 23rd edition of the manual of mineral science : (after James D. Dana). J. Wiley. ISBN 978-0-471-72157-4. OCLC 1109166232.

== Personal life ==
Dutrow is a long distance runner. She is married to Darrell Henry, a geology professor at Louisiana State University.
