= Katharine Blunt =

American chemist (1876–1954)

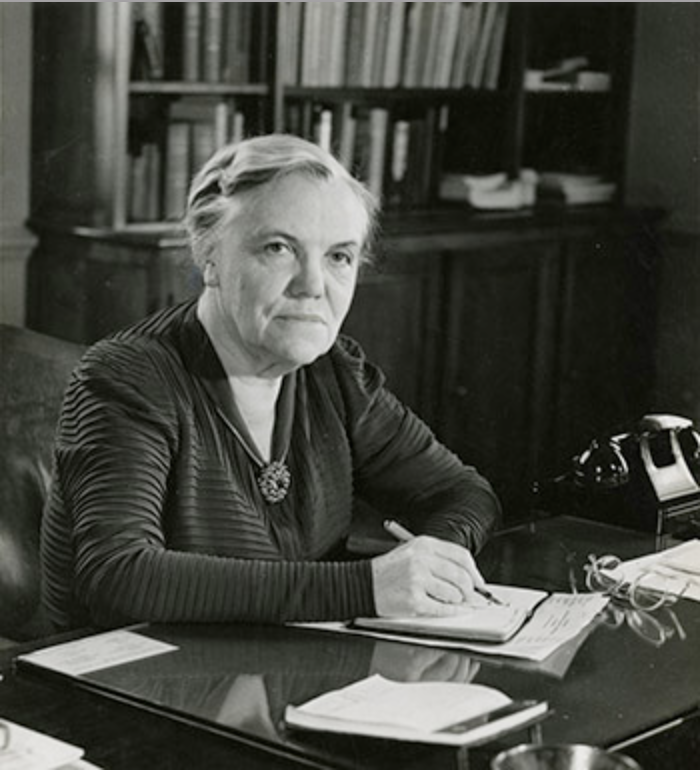
- Born: May 28, 1876; Philadelphia, Pennsylvania, US
- Died: July 29, 1954 (aged 78)
- Education: Vassar College (AB); Massachusetts Institute of Technology; University of Chicago (PhD)
- Occupations: Chemist, nutritionist, educator

Katharine Blunt (May 28, 1876 – July 29, 1954) was an American chemist, professor, and nutritionist who specialized in the fields of home economics, food chemistry and nutrition. Most of her research was on nutrition, but she also made improvements to research on calcium and phosphorus metabolism and on the basal metabolism of women and children. She served on the faculty at The University of Chicago and as the third president of Connecticut College for Women.

== Early life and education ==
Katharine Blunt was born on May 28, 1876, in Philadelphia, Pennsylvania, the eldest of three daughters of Stanhope English Blunt and Fanny (née Smyth) Blunt. The geologist Charles Henry Smyth, Jr., was a first cousin.

Blunt attended The Elms, also known as the Porter School, a private girls' school in Springfield, Massachusetts run by Miss Charlotte Porter. She then enrolled in Vassar College and in 1898 received a Bachelor of Arts (A.B.) degree and was elected to Phi Beta Kappa. After four years at home she enrolled at the Massachusetts Institute of Technology (MIT) for post-graduate studies during 1902–1903. Blunt received her Ph.D. in chemistry and physics from The University of Chicago in 1907. The title of her dissertation, completed under the mentorship of Prof. Julius Stieglitz, was "The Formation of Amidines".

== Career ==
=== Academic positions ===
For one year Blunt was an instructor in chemistry at Pratt Institute in Brooklyn, New York, then returned to Vassar College in 1908 as an instructor in chemistry. In 1913, Blunt left Vassar again, this time for a position as an assistant professor in the department of home economics in the College of Education at the University of Chicago. She was promoted to associate professor in 1918 and full professor in 1925. In 1918, she was named acting chair and in 1925 formal head of the department. While she was chair, the department grew to seventeen staff members and produced researchers, administrators, and nutritionists. She developed in the university's graduate school one of the best departments of home economics in any American university.

Blunt was concerned that home economics would not become an established profession, so she worked to make it an appropriate subject of instruction and to plan a scientific curriculum for training professionals. From 1924 to 1926, she served as president of the American Home Economics Association (AHEA), which had been founded in 1908 and by the mid-1920s had several thousand members. Previously she had served as Illinois Chapter president and as national vice president. Under her leadership, contacts with other organizations increased and came to include the National Education Association, the American Association of University Women, and the American Child Health Association, among others. In 1928, the AHEA observed that Blunt's administration had enhanced the quality of graduate work in the field, and that her own devotion to research had provided an invaluable example to students.

=== Connecticut College ===
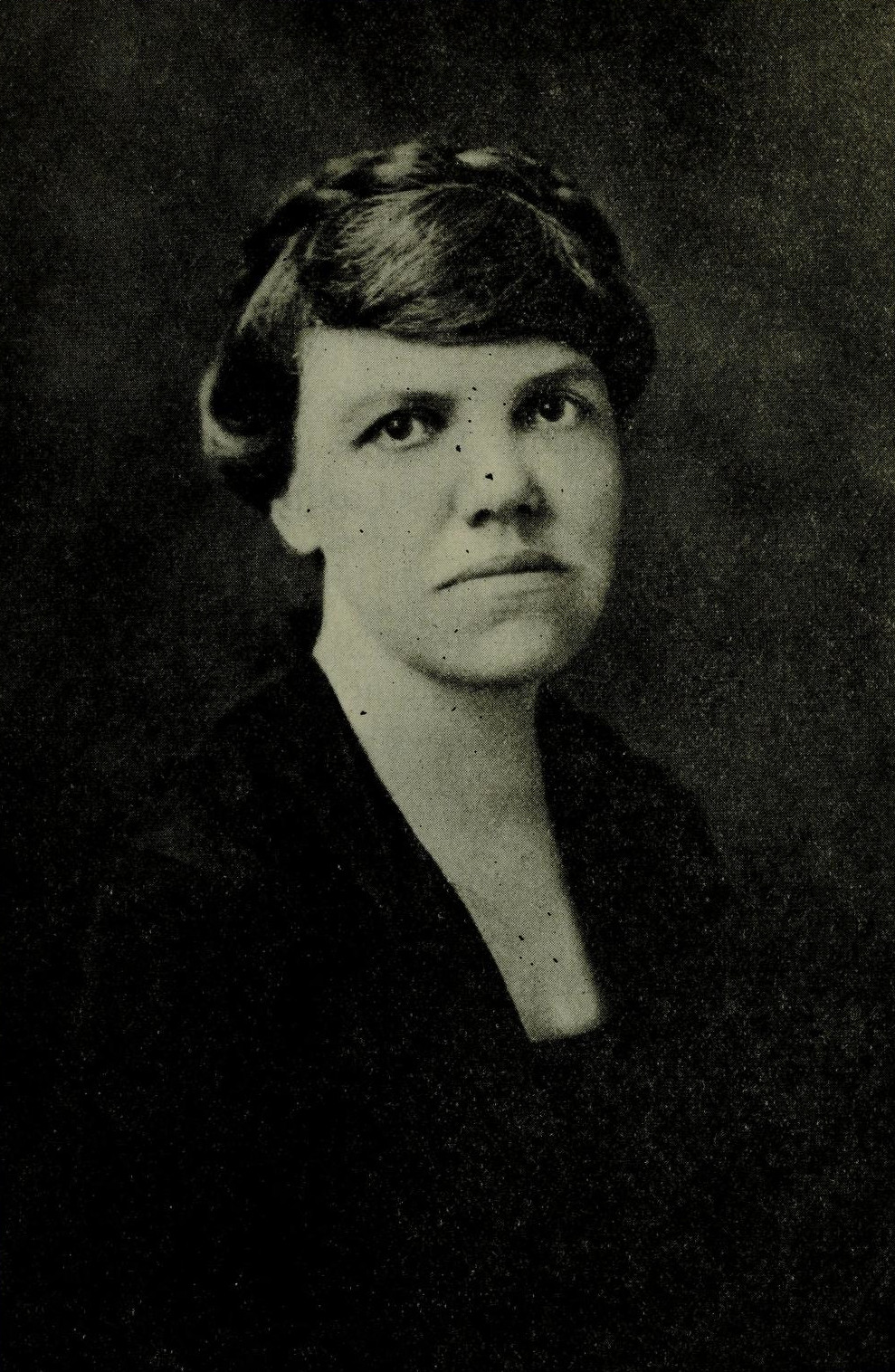
Blunt at the time she became president of Connecticut College

In 1929, Blunt was invited to become the president of Connecticut College for Women, a four-year liberal arts college. She was inaugurated as the third president and first woman president of the college on May 16, 1930. Under her leadership several new buildings were constructed and the size of the student body increased. In 1934, the Connecticut College Arboretum opened and, in 1939, Palmer Auditorium was established. She also secured increased appropriations for faculty salaries and student scholarships, and endowments and fellowships were expanded. It was important to her that the curriculum and extra-curricular activities would help to realize the potential of students in all facets of their lives. The improvements she made led to the college's accreditation in 1932.

"Courageous, with an abundance of initiative, clear headed, full of that pioneering spirit in education", as one colleague noted, "she has in a relatively brief period made Connecticut College one of the outstanding colleges in New England". During her administration the college also came to be ranked scholastically among the top colleges for women in America. In 1943, she retired, aged 67, but was recalled as president in 1945 at the request of the board of trustees. Blunt served in that position for another year.

=== Scholarly and civic contributions ===
During her career Blunt published many articles on nutrition and food chemistry in technical journals, and she served as editor of the University of Chicago's Home Economics Series. She also published articles on the education of women. Blunt believed that "the days of confining college education to the campus are over", and that women "with their belief in the force of education and their fresh political energy, can do much to serve the democracy which has helped them." Together with Ruth Cowan, she published Ultra-Violet Light and Vitamin D in Nutrition, a book summarizing research in the field.

During her career Blunt was a member of many professional and civic societies, including the National Education Association, the American Association of University Women, the American Chemical Society, the Biochemical Society, the League of Women Voters, Omicron Nu and Sigma Xi. She also belonged to the Cosmopolitan Club in New York, was a member of the Connecticut State Board of Education, and in 1944–1945 was chairman of the New London, Connecticut, Red Cross War Fund.

=== Government service ===
During World War I Blunt served the government as a nutrition expert. From 1917–18, she worked for the United States Department of Agriculture and the Food Administration, preparing emergency pamphlets on nutrition and food conservation. The series of 4-page publications, called the United States Food Leaflets, were co-written by Blunt, Florence Powdermaker and Louise Pritchett. The leaflets included recipes and emphasized food choices and the preparation of an adequate diet; among the first titles were "Do You Know Corn Meal?" and "Food for Your Children". One aim of the series was to "provide a large amount of data fundamental to extension teaching and other popular instruction".

In 1918, Blunt was called to Washington, D.C. to serve on a committee of university instructors appointed to plan the introduction of conservation courses into universities and colleges. She was granted a leave of absence by the University of Chicago for the winter quarter of that year. The United States Food Administration published these lessons as a book under the title Food and the War: A Textbook for College Classes.

=== Kappa Mu Sigma ===
In 1921, Blunt was elected as a member of the Kappa Mu Sigma, a women's graduate chemistry fraternity founded in 1920 at the University of Chicago. The aim of the society was "to raise the standards of professional chemistry among women by insisting on the importance of complete training for a professional career", and to promote social cooperation among women in chemistry-related careers. The names of the Greek letters Κ, Μ, and Σ were chosen to signify the name of "Curie, Marie Sklowdowska". Marie Curie and Julius Stieglitz were selected as the first and second honorary members of the society, respectively. In the fall of 1921, Blunt traveled with three others from the society to install a second chapter of Kappa Mu Sigma at Columbia University in New York.

This society was chosen to canvas the University of Chicago for funds, as part of a nation-wide campaign by women, that went toward the purchase of a gram of radium for Madame Curie for her research back in Paris. The radium was presented to Curie on her arrival in the United States in the spring of 1921. Blunt went to New York City in June 1921 as a delegate to meetings honoring Curie. Kappa Mu Sigma appears to have been discontinued sometime after 1927.

== Death ==
After Blunt retired from Connecticut College, she traveled extensively and later died of a pulmonary embolism on July 29, 1954, at Lawrence Memorial Hospital in New London, Connecticut, while recovering from a broken hip. She was buried at Oak Grove Cemetery in Springfield, Massachusetts.

== Publications ==
- Blunt, Katharine & Feeney, Clara M. (1915). The smoking temperatures of edible fats. J. Home Econ. 7:10, 535–541.
- Blunt, Katharine & Wang, Chi Che (1916). Chinese preserved eggs—pidan. J. Biol. Chem. 28:1, 125–134.
- Recent work on normal adult nutrition (1916). J. Home Econ. 8:12, 623–624.
- Blunt, Katharine; Powdermaker, Florence (1918). Food and the war: a textbook for college classes. Boston: Houghton Mifflin. OCLC 597517316.
- Blunt, Katharine; Swain, Francis L; & Powdermaker, Florence (1918). Food guide for war service at home. Prepared under the direction of the United States Food Administration, with a preface by Herbert Hoover. New York: Charles Scribner's Sons. Food guide for war service at home, | Library of Congress.
- Blunt, Katharine (1916). Chemistry as a field for women. The Chicago Chemical Bulletin 3:4, 48–51.
- Blunt, Katharine & Otis, Florence A. (1917) Losses of iron in cooking vegetables. J. Home Econ. 9:5, 213–218.
- Blunt, Katharine (1919). Digestibility of Bacon. J. Biol. Chem. 38:1, 43–48.
- Blunt, Katharine & Wang, Chi Che (1921). The present status of vitamins. J. Home Econ. 13:3, 97–119.
- Blunt, Katharine & Dye, Marie (1921). Basal metabolism of normal women. J. Biol. Chem. 47:1, 69–87.
- Blunt, Katharine; Nelson, Alta; & Oleson, Harriet Curry (1921) The basal metabolism of underweight children. J. Biol. Chem. 49:1, 247–262.
- McLaughlin, Laura & Blunt, Katharine (1923). Some observations on the creatinine excretion of women. J. Biol. Chem. 58:1, 285–290.
- Blunt, Katharine (1923). School of education: Nutrition work of the department of home economics. University of Chicago Magazine 15:5, 185–186.
- Bauer, Virginia & Blunt, Katharine (1924). Effect of a small breakfast on the energy metabolism of children. J. Biol. Chem. 59:1, 77–82.
- Chaney, Margaret S. & Blunt, Katharine (1925). The effect of orange juice on the calcium, phosphorus, magnesium, and nitrogen retention and urinary organic acids in growing children. J. Biol. Chem. 66:2, 829–845.
- Blunt, Katharine (1925). President's address, 18th annual meeting of the American Home Economics Association. J. Home Econ. 8:1, 537–542.
- McLaughlin, Laura & Blunt, Katharine (1926). Urinary excretion of organic acid and its variant with diet. J. Biol. Chem. 58:1, 267–284.
- Blunt, Katharine; Tilt, Jennie; McLaughlin, Laura; & Gunn, Katherine B. (1926) The basal metabolism of girls. J. Biol. Chem. 67:2, 491–503.
- Willard, Alice & Blunt, Katharine (1927). A comparison of evaporated with pasteurized milk as a source of calcium, phosphorus, and nitrogen. J. Biol. Chem. 75:1, 251–262.
- Blunt, Katharine & Sumner, Emma (1928). The calcium of cheese. J. Home Econ. 20:8, 587–590.
- Blunt, Katharine & Cowan, Ruth (1929). Do adults need Vitamin D? JAMA 93:15, 1141–1143.
- Blunt, Katharine & Cowan, Ruth (1929). Distribution of Vitamin D: cod liver oil. JAMA 93:16, 1219–1223.
- Blunt, Katharine & Cowan, Ruth (1929). Irradiated foods and irradiated ergosterol. JAMA 93:17, 1301–1308.
- Coons, Callie Mae & Blunt, Katharine (1930). The retention of nitrogen, calcium, phosphorus, and magnesium by pregnant women. J. Biol. Chem. 86:1, 1–16.
- Blunt, Katharine; Cowan, Ruth (1930). Ultraviolet light and vitamin D in nutrition. Chicago: University of Chicago Press. OCLC 701695607.
- Blunt, Katharine (1930). What constitutes a good college for women? AAUP Bull. 16:8, 591–594.
- Blunt, Katharine (1934). College living is part of college education. University of Chicago Magazine 26:7, 245–246.

== Awards and honors ==
- 1905–06 The Mary Richardson and Lydia Pratt Babbott Fellowship, 1905–06
- 1936 Doctor of Laws, Wesleyan University
- 1937 Doctor of Laws, Mt. Holyoke College
- 1943 Doctor of Laws, Connecticut College
- 1941 University of Chicago Alumni Medal
- 1949 Citizenship Award, Men's Club of Congregation Beth El
- 1952 Citizenship Award, Connecticut Grand Lodge, Sons of Italy
- 1954 50-Year Member, American Chemical Society
- 1954 Fellow, American Association for the Advancement of Science

== Legacy ==
When Blunt died, the college was bequeathed her residence at 38 Glenwood Avenue, an apartment building at 640 Williams Street, and a portion of the residue of her estate. In 1946, one of the new dormitories at Connecticut College was named in Blunt's honor. Katharine Blunt House is often referred to as "KB". In 1955, the Katharine Blunt Professorship was established by the board of trustees of the college; the professorship is awarded to a faculty member in a department of the natural sciences.
