= Charles Phelps Smyth =

American chemist (1895–1990)

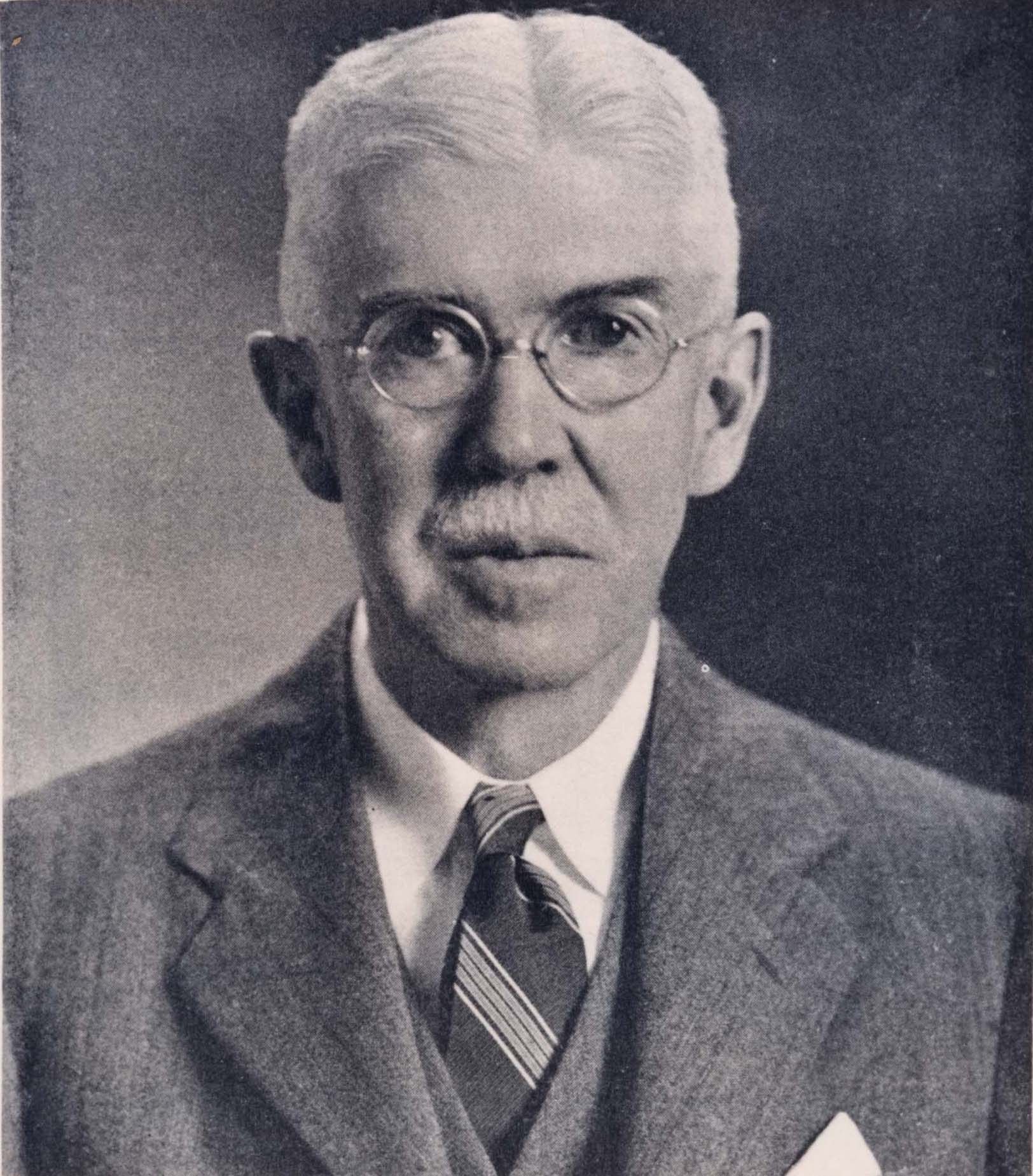
- Born: February 10, 1895; Clinton, New York, United States
- Died: March 18, 1990 (aged 95); Bozeman, Montana, United States
- Education: Princeton University; Harvard University
- Awards: Medal of Freedom (1947); William H. Nichols Medal (1954)
- Scientific career
- Fields: Chemistry
- Institutions: Princeton University
- Thesis: Solid thallium amalgams (1921)
- Doctoral advisor: Theodore William Richards
- Doctoral students: William O. Baker

Charles Phelps "Charlie" Smyth (/smaɪθ/; February 10, 1895 – March 18, 1990) was an American chemist. He was educated at Princeton University and Harvard University. From 1920 to 1963 he was a faculty member in the Princeton Department of Chemistry, and from 1963 to 1970 he was a consultant to the Office of Naval Research. He was awarded the Nichols Medal by the New York Section of the American Chemical Society in 1954.

During World War I he worked in the National Bureau of Standards and the Chemical Warfare Service, and during World War II he worked on the Manhattan Project and Operation Alsos. He was awarded the Medal of Freedom in 1947 for the last.

== Biography ==
Smyth was born February 10, 1895, in Clinton, New York, to Ruth Anne Phelps and Charles Henry Smyth Jr., a professor of geology at Hamilton College. Woodrow Wilson, then President of Princeton University, convinced Smyth pére to join the faculty at Princeton, and in 1905 the family moved to Princeton, New Jersey.

Charles Phelps Smyth and his younger brother, Henry DeWolf Smyth, attended the same primary and secondary schools. The younger brother also received undergraduate and master's degrees from Princeton, but in physics, and became a Princeton faculty member like Charles Phelps Smyth and their father. Both brothers served in the Chemical Warfare Service in World War I and on the Manhattan Project.

In 1955 he married Emily Ellen Vezin. His 1990 The New York Times obituary mentions his wife but does not mention children.

== Education ==
In Princeton, Charles Phelps Smyth attended Miss Fine's School, which later became the Princeton Day School, and the Lawrenceville School. He then entered Princeton as an undergraduate, where he was elected to Phi Beta Kappa as a junior. He received a Bachelor of Arts degree summa cum laude in 1916 and remained at Princeton to obtain a Master of Arts degree in 1917.

During World War I, he served in the National Bureau of Standards, where he worked on electroplating, and the Chemical Warfare Service, where he worked on poison gas. After the war, in 1921, he received a Ph.D. in chemistry from Harvard. Theodore William Richards advised him in his dissertation on thallium amalgam.

== Academic career ==
Smyth was appointed an instructor at Princeton in 1920; he taught a freshman chemistry laboratory class there while finishing his Harvard dissertation. He was made an assistant professor in 1923, an associate professor in 1927, a full professor in 1938, and the David B. Jones Professor of Chemistry in 1958. He retired from Princeton in 1963. From 1963 to 1978 he was involved with the Office of Naval Research (ONR) as a consultant and, in 1969 and 1970, served as the ONR's liaison scientist in London.

Smyth's research was in chemical physics, specifically on dielectric properties of matter. An early discovery on dipole moment proved correct August Kekulé's conjecture on the structure of benzene. His collaborators at Princeton included Karl Taylor Compton. Smyth mentored over 50 doctoral students, including William O. Baker. He published two books and over 300 research articles. He was an associate editor of the Journal of Chemical Physics during 1933–36 and 1952–54.

The New York Section of the American Chemical Society awarded Smyth the William H. Nichols Medal in 1954. He was elected to the American Philosophical Society in 1932 and the National Academy of Sciences in 1955. He was a fellow of the American Physical Society (elected 1937) and a member of the American Chemical Society and the Royal Society of Chemistry.

== World War II ==
Smyth joined the U.S. Navy Reserve in 1937 and was commissioned as a lieutenant commander. He resigned in 1941. From 1943 to 1945 he worked on deuterium in the Manhattan Project, mostly from Princeton. He also served as a consultant to the War Department.

In 1945, close to the end of the war in Europe, Smyth joined the covert Operation Alsos. The 50-year-old chemist flew to Europe to help determine the state of the German nuclear weapons program and capture equipment and personnel. At an abandoned factory in Celle he discovered a centrifuge used for uranium enrichment, inspiring a frantic effort to find Paul Harteck. Smyth also hunted Paul Herold, Eberhardt Elbel, and a Professor Osenberg. Smyth was awarded the Medal of Freedom for his work with Alsos.

== Later years and legacy ==
Smyth remained active in chemistry later in life, publishing a review paper as late as 1982. In 1987 he and his wife Emily moved to Bozeman, Montana, where he died on March 18, 1990.

After his death, Emily endowed a chair in the Chemistry Department in his name. When she died in 2009, she endowed an additional two assistant professorships. The sitting and to date only Charles Phelps Smyth Professor of Chemistry is Herschel Rabitz.
