= Norwegian Archaeological Society =

The Norwegian Archaeological Society (Norwegian: Norsk Arkeologisk Selskap) is a society of Norwegians interested in archaeology.

The group aims to propagate results of Norwegian archaeological research through its magazine, Viking. Formed in 1936, its first secretary-general was Anton Wilhelm Brøgger, who served until his death in 1951.

The current president is Lyder Marstrander. Board members are Sonja Vibecke Robøle, Siri Undall, Per Kristian Skulberg, Ronny Henriksen, Håvard Hoftun, Ellen Drage Støeng, Marianne Vedeler (secretary general) and Thomas Kjær (secretary).
