= Chester Ray Longwell =

American geologist

- Born: 15 October 1887; Spalding
- Died: 15 December 1975 (aged 88); Palo Alto
- Education: Yale University, University of Missouri
- Occupation: Geologist, professor, writer
- Employer: Yale University (1920–1956)
- Position held: president (1949–), chair (1938–1946), professor emeritus (1956–), research associate (1956–)

Chester Ray Longwell (15 October 1887 – 15 December 1975) was an American geologist who conducted extensive research into the geology of the Basin and Range province in Nevada. His fieldwork led to a more complete understanding of Paleozoic and lower Mesozoic stratigraphic sequence in the southern Great Basin.

Elected a Fellow of the Geological Society of America in 1923, Longwell served as society's president in 1949. He was elected a member of the National Academy of Sciences in 1935. From 1953 to 1954, he served as president, American Geological Institute. He was elected to the American Philosophical Society in 1948 and the American Academy of Arts and Sciences in 1953.

Chester Ray Longwell was born on 15 October 1887 near Spalding, Missouri to John Kilgore and Julia (Megown) Longwell. He earned his bachelor's degree at University of Missouri and his Ph.D. at Yale. He taught at Yale from 1920 to 1956. He died at his home in Palo Alto, California on 15 December 1975.

== Selected publictations ==
- R. Ernest Anderson; Chester R. Longwell; Richard Lee Armstrong; Richard F. Marvin (1972). "Significance of K-Ar Ages of Tertiary Rocks from the Lake Mead Region, Nevada-Arizona". Geological Society of America Bulletin. 83 (2): 273. Bibcode:1972GSAB...83..273A. doi:10.1130/0016-7606(1972)83[273:SOKAOT]2.0.CO;2. ISSN 0016-7606. S2CID 128825151. Wikidata Q70943819.
- C. R. Longwell (30 September 1936). "Geology of the Boulder Reservoir floor, Arizona-Nevada". Geological Society of America Bulletin. 47 (9): 1393–1476. Bibcode:1936GSAB...47.1393L. doi:10.1130/GSAB-47-1393. ISSN 0016-7606. S2CID 128829101. Wikidata Q59312065.
- Chester R. Longwell (1945). "Low-angle normal faults in the basin-and-range province". Transactions, American Geophysical Union. 26 (1): 107. Bibcode:1945TrAGU..26..107L. doi:10.1029/TR026I001P00107. ISSN 0002-8606. S2CID 130600449. Wikidata Q66960765.
