= Heinrich Ries =

American geologist (1871–1951)

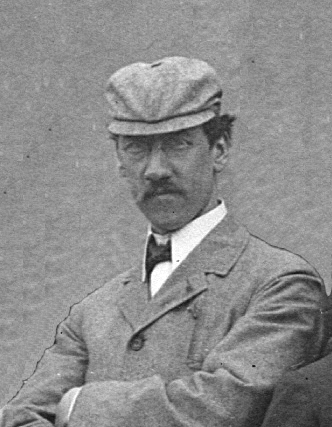
- Born: April 30, 1871; Brooklyn, New York
- Died: April 11, 1951 (aged 79); Ithaca, New York
- Citizenship: American
- Education: Columbia University, University of Berlin
- Scientific career
- Fields: Economic geology, Geology
- Workplaces: Cornell University
- Thesis: The monoclinic pyroxenes of New York State (1896)
- Doctoral advisor: Thomas Egleston; James Furman Kemp

Heinrich Ries (April 30, 1871 – April 11, 1951) was an American economic geologist, born in Brooklyn, New York, and educated at Columbia University and at the University of Berlin. He was employed principally at Cornell University, initially as an instructor (1898–1902), as an assistant professor (1902–1905), as professor, and as head of the geological department (1915- ). Professor Ries made numerous reports on clay published by the United States Geological Survey, the New York State Geological Survey and the Canadian Geological Survey.

His first wife, Millie Timmerman Ries, a botanist and scientific illustrator who collaborated with Elizabeth Britton and Anna Murray Vail, died in 1942. He remarried in 1948, but his second wife, Mrs. Adelyn Halsy Gregg Ries, died early in 1950. He had two sons with his first wife Millie, Professor Victor H. Reis of Ohio State University, and Professor Donald T. Ries of Illinois State Normal University.

Ries was president of the Geological Society of America in 1929.

== Publications ==
- Clay Deposits and Clay Industry in North Carolina: A Preliminary Report (1897)
- Clays and Shales of Michigan: Their Properties and Uses (1900)
- Economic Geology of the United States (1905; third edition, revised, 1911)
- Clays: Their Occurrence, Properties, and Uses (1906, second edition, 1908)
- Clays of Texas (1908)
- History of Clay-Working Industry in the United States (1909), with Henry Leighton
- Building Stones and Clay Products: A Handbook for Architects (1912)
- Engineering Geology (1914; second edition, revised, 1915)
