= J. J. Stevenson (geologist) =

American geologist (1841–1924)

John James Stevenson
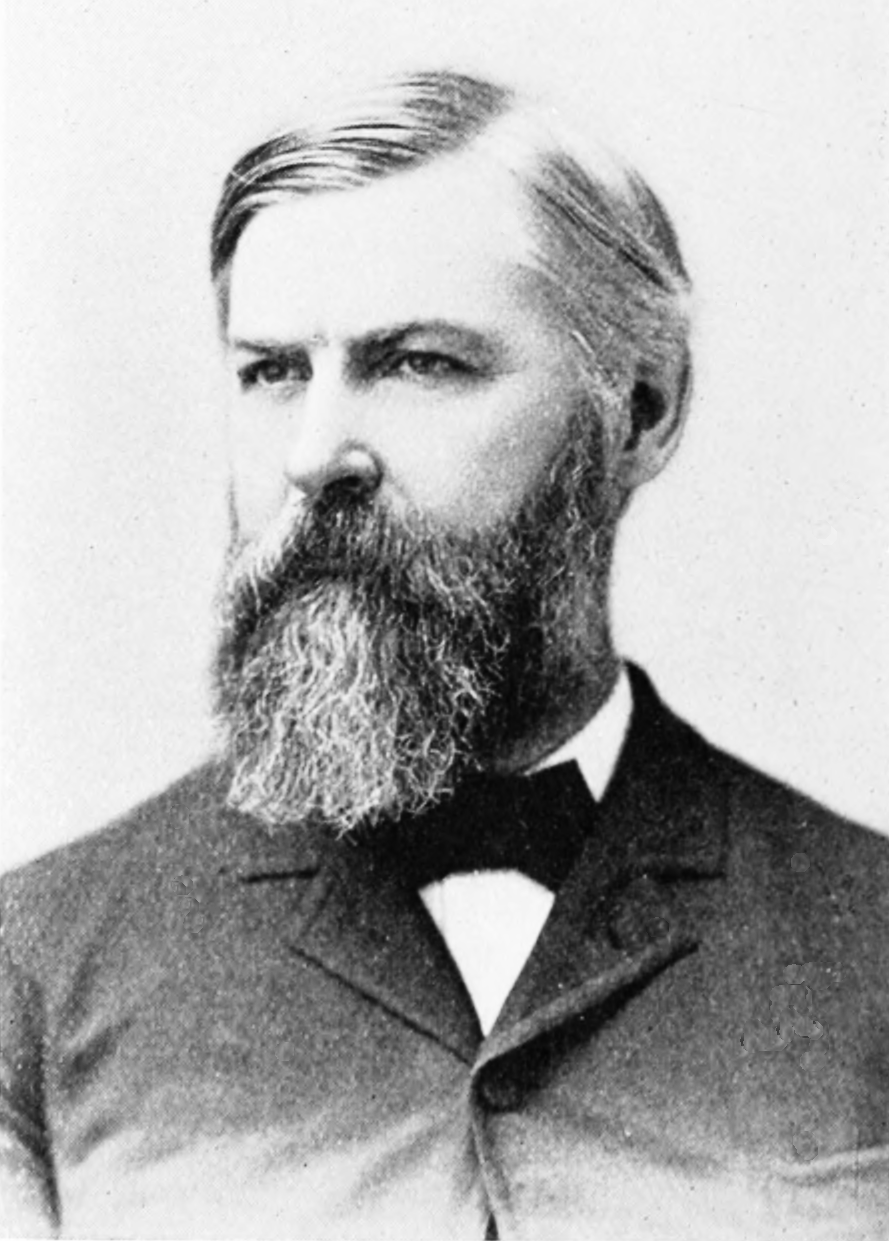
- John James Stevenson in 1897
- Born: October 10, 1841; New York City, New York, U.S.
- Died: August 10, 1924 (aged 82); New Canaan, Connecticut, U.S.
- Education: New York University
- Known for: Geology of Pennsylvania
- Scientific career
- Fields: Geology, Stratigraphy
- Notable students: Israel Charles White

John James Stevenson (October 10, 1841 – August 10, 1924) was an American geologist, born in New York City. He graduated from New York University in 1863, became professor of chemistry at West Virginia University for two years (1869–71), then served as professor of geology at New York University until 1909. During 1873–74 and from 1878 to 1880 he was geologist for the United States Geological Survey. He also served on the Pennsylvania Geological Survey from 1875 to 1878 and from 1881 to 1882. He was president of the Geological Society of America in 1898.

He died in New Canaan, Connecticut on August 10, 1924.

== Selected publications ==
- Notes on the Geology of West Virginia (1873)
- The Geological Relations of the Lignitic Groups (1875)
- On Dr. Peale's Notes on the Age of the Rocky Mountains in Colorado (1877)
- The Upper Devonian Rocks of Southwest Pennsylvania (1878)
- Note on the Fox Hills Group of Colorado (1879)
- Notes on the Geology of Galisteo Creek, New Mexico (1879)
- Notes on the Laramie Group of Southern Colorado and Northern New Mexico (1879)
- Surface Geology of South-West Pennsylvania and Adjacent Portions of West Virginia and Maryland (1879)
- Notes on the Geology of Wise, Lee and Scott Counties, Virginia (1880)
- Notes Respecting a Re-Eroded Channel-Way (1880)
- A Geological Reconnaissance of Parts of Lee, Wise, Scott and Washington Counties, Virginia (1881)
- Report upon Geological Examinations in Southern Colorado and Northern New Mexico during 1878 and 1879 (1881)
- The Upper Freeport Coal Bed Along Laurel Ridge in Preston County of West Virginia (1881)
- Notes on the Quinnimont Coal Group in Mercer Co. of West Virginia and Tazewell Co. of Virginia (1881)
- Notes on the Coal-Field Near Cañon City, Colorado (1881)
- Note on the Laramie Group of Southern New Mexico (1881)
- Note on the Laramie Group in the Vicinity of Raton, New Mexico (1882)
- Memorial Notice of Benjamin Nicholas Martin (1884)
- Notes on the Geologic Structure of Tazewell, Russell, Wise, Smyth and Washington Counties of Virginia (1885)
- Some Notes Respecting Metamorphism (1885)
- A Geological Reconnaissance of Bland, Giles, Wythe and Portions of Pulaski and Montgomery Counties of Virginia (1887)
- Notes on the Lower Carboniferous Groups Along the Easterly Side of the Appalachian Area in Pennsylvania and the Virginias (1887)
- Notes of the Surface Geology of South-West Virginia (1887)
- The Faults of Southwest Virginia (1887)
- The Mesozoic Rocks of Southern Colorado and Northern New Mexico (1889)
- Discussion on the effect of shearing strains (1890)
- Review: Stratigraphy of the Bituminous Coal Field of Pennsylvania, Ohio and West Virginia; by Israel C. White (1892)
- John Strong Newberry (1893)
- On the Use of the Name "Catskill" (1893)
- Origin of the Pennsylvania Anthracite (1893)
- Some Notes on Southeastern Alaska and its People (1893)
- On the New England Coal Fields of the United States (1895)
- Origin of Pennsylvania Anthracite (1895)
- Review: A Summary Description of the Geology of Pennsylvania. J.P. Lesley (1896)
- The Geological Congress at St. Petersburg (1897)
- The Debt of the World to Pure Science (1898)
- 1898 Geological Society of America Presidential Address: Our Society
- Memoir of James Hall (1900)
- Edward Orton (1900)
- Should Latin and Greek be Required for the Degree of Bachelor of Arts (1900)
- The Section at Schoharie, N.Y. (1901)
- Review: History of Geology and Paleontology to the End of the Nineteenth Century. By Karl Alfred von Zittel (1902)
- Carboniferous of the Appalachian Basin (1903–1907)
- J. Peter Lesley (1903)
- The Jurassic Coal of Spitzbergen (1905)
- Recent Geology of Spitzbergen (1905)
- The Centenary of the Geological Society of London (1907)
- Darwin and Geology (1909)
- The Coal Basin of Commentry in Central France (1910)
- The Coal Basin of Decazeville, France (1910)
- Formation of Coal Beds (1911–1913)
- Interrelations of the Fossil Fuels (1916–1918)
- Origin of formkohle (1917)
- Academic unrest and college control (1920)
