= John C. Maxwell (geologist) =

John C. Maxwell (1914–2006) was an American geologist who served as president of the American Geological Institute and the Geological Society of America. He was the William Stamps Farish Chair Professor in Geology at the The University of Texas. He also taught at Princeton University

In 1965, Maxwell was named a fellow of the American Association for the Advancement of Science.
