= Judith Totman Parrish =

British–American geologist and paleoclimatologist

Judith (Judy) Totman Parrish is an American geologist and paleoclimatologist known for her research on deep-time paleoclimate, sedimentary geology, and paleoceanography. She is Professor Emerita in the Department of Geological Sciences at the University of Idaho and a former President of the Geological Society of America (GSA).

Her work focuses on the scientific understanding of ancient climate systems, particularly during the Paleozoic and Mesozoic eras, with a focus on global climate modeling, sedimentology of ancient ocean upwelling systems, Cretaceous polar climate, and the climate of the supercontinent Pangea.

== Biography ==
Parrish was born in September 1950 in California to Bob and Dru Totman. She completed all of her higher education at the University of California, Santa Cruz.

She received a B.A. in Biology in 1972, writing a thesis on female-female interactions among northern elephant seals. She earned an M.A. in Biology in 1976 with a thesis on the movements of the northern elephant seal along the North American coast. In 1977, she was awarded an M.S. in Earth Sciences by examination and completed her Ph.D. in Earth Sciences in 1979 with a dissertation titled "Problems in the Biogeography of Recent and Fossil Benthic Marine Invertebrates." She later undertook leadership training through the University of Arizona Leadership Institute between 2000 and 2003.

== Career ==
Her early career included positions as a research associate at the University of Chicago in the Geophysical Sciences Department from 1978 to 1981, followed by a consulting role for the U.S. Geological Survey (USGS) in 1981. She then worked as a research geologist at the USGS in Denver, Colorado, from 1982 to 1988.

During this time, she led projects on the carbon cycle, petroleum resources, high-latitude Cretaceous climates, and paleo-upwelling. She also participated in studies related to the Arctic National Wildlife Refuge, North Slope basin analysis, and oil and gas resource classification.

In 1988, Parrish joined the University of Arizona as an associate professor with tenure in the Department of Geosciences. She was promoted to full professor in 1992 and remained in that role until 2004. During her time at Arizona, she was Associate Dean of the College of Science from 2000 to 2003, Interim Head of the Department of Atmospheric Sciences in 2001, and Director of the Geosciences Summer Field Camp from 1995 to 1997. She was also a visiting scholar in the Department of Geological and Environmental Sciences at Stanford University in 1994.

In 2003, Parrish became Dean of the College of Science at the University of Idaho and a professor in the Department of Geological Sciences. She served as dean until 2007 and continued as professor until 2011, when she retired and was named Professor Emerita.

She served as President of the Geological Society of America from 2008 to 2009 and as interim Executive Director of both the GSA in 2015 and the STEPPE program from 2013 to 2014. From 2021 to 2025, she served as President of the SEPM (Society for Sedimentary Geology) Foundation.

== Awards and honors ==
- Laurence L. Sloss Award, Sedimentary Geology Division, Geological Society of America (GSA) (2022)
- GSA Distinguished Service Award (2018)
- Earth and Space Sciences Alumni Hall of Fame, University of California, Santa Cruz (2018)
- NASA/Space Grant Mentor (1999–2000)
- Fellow, Geological Society of America (elected 1994)

== Selected publications ==
=== Books and edited volumes ===
- Wang, Chengshan (2013). Graham, S. A; Parrish, J. T; Wan, X. (eds.). "Environmental/climate change in the Cretaceous greenhouse world: Records from Terrestrial scientific drilling of Songliao Basin and adjacent areas of China". Palaeogeography, Palaeoclimatology, Palaeoecology. 385: 1–5. Bibcode:2013PPP...385....1W. doi:10.1016/j.palaeo.2013.05.006. ISSN 0031-0182.
- Parrish, JudithTotman (2004). "Paleoecology, Paleogeography, and Paleoclimatology: A Tribute to A. M. Ziegler on his Retirement". The Journal of Geology. 112 (6): 623–624. Bibcode:2004JG....112..623P. doi:10.1086/424865. ISSN 0022-1376.
- Parrish, Judith Totman (1998). Interpreting pre-Quaternary climate from the geologic record. The Perspectives in paleobiology and earth history series. New York: Columbia University Press. ISBN 978-0-231-10206-3.
- Parrish, Judith Totman; Barron, Eric J. (1986). Paleoclimates and Economic Geology. SEPM (Society for Sedimentary Geology). doi:10.2110/scn.86.18. ISBN 978-1-56576-247-3.

=== Journals ===
- McCabe, Peter J.; Parrish, Judith Totman (1992), Tectonic and climatic controls on the distribution and quality of Cretaceous coals, Geological Society of America Special Papers, vol. 267, Geological Society of America, pp. 1–16, doi:10.1130/spe267-p1, ISBN 0-8137-2267-5
- Chan, Marjorie A.; Parrish, Judith Totman; Hasiotis, Stephen T. (2023). "An erg landscape mystery: An exotic boulder in Jurassic aeolian-fluvial deposits, Grand Staircase Escalante National Monument, Utah, USA". Geological Journal. 58 (12): 4519–4532. Bibcode:2023GeolJ..58.4519C. doi:10.1002/gj.4829. ISSN 0072-1050.
- Parrish, Judith Totman (1993). "Climate of the Supercontinent Pangea". The Journal of Geology. 101 (2): 215–233. Bibcode:1993JG....101..215P. doi:10.1086/648217. ISSN 0022-1376.
- Totman Parrish, Judith; Curtis, Rebecca L. (1982-11-01). "Atmospheric circulation, upwelling, and organic-rich rocks in the Mesozoic and Cenozoic eras". Palaeogeography, Palaeoclimatology, Palaeoecology. Paleogeography and Climate. 40 (1): 31–66. Bibcode:1982PPP....40...31T. doi:10.1016/0031-0182(82)90084-0. ISSN 0031-0182.
- Parrish, Judith Totman; Ziegler, A. M.; Scotese, Christopher R. (1982-11-01). "Rainfall patterns and the distribution of coals and evaporites in the Mesozoic and Cenozoic". Palaeogeography, Palaeoclimatology, Palaeoecology. Paleogeography and Climate. 40 (1): 67–101. Bibcode:1982PPP....40...67P. doi:10.1016/0031-0182(82)90085-2. ISSN 0031-0182.
- Parrish, Judith Totman (1982). "Upwelling and Petroleum Source Beds, With Reference to Paleozoic". AAPG Bulletin. 66 (6): 750–774. ISSN 0149-1423.
- Parrish, Judith Totman; Peterson, Fred (1988-04-01). "Wind directions predicted from global circulation models and wind directions determined from eolian sandstones of the western United States—A comparison". Sedimentary Geology. 56 (1): 261–282. Bibcode:1988SedG...56..261P. doi:10.1016/0037-0738(88)90056-5. ISSN 0037-0738.
- Dubiel, Russell F.; Parrish, Judith Totman; Parrish, J. Michael; Good, Steven C. (1991). "The Pangaean Megamonsoon: Evidence from the Upper Triassic Chinle Formation, Colorado Plateau". PALAIOS. 6 (4): 347–370. Bibcode:1991Palai...6..347D. doi:10.2307/3514963. ISSN 0883-1351. JSTOR 3514963.
- Rowley, David B.; Raymond, Anne; Parrish, Judith Totman; Lottes, Ann L.; Scotese, Christopher R.; Ziegler, Alfred M. (1985-06-01). "Carboniferous paleogeographic, phytogeographic, and paleoclimatic reconstructions". International Journal of Coal Geology. 5 (1): 7–42. Bibcode:1985IJCG....5....7R. doi:10.1016/0166-5162(85)90009-6. ISSN 0166-5162.
- Spicer, Robert A.; Parrish, Judith Totman (1990). "Late Cretaceous–early Tertiary palaeoclimates of northern high latitudes: a quantitative view". Journal of the Geological Society. 147 (2): 329–341. Bibcode:1990JGSoc.147..329S. doi:10.1144/gsjgs.147.2.0329.
- Parrish, Judith Totman; Peterson, Fred; Turner, Christine E (2004-05-15). "Jurassic "savannah"—plant taphonomy and climate of the Morrison Formation (Upper Jurassic, Western USA)". Sedimentary Geology. Reconstruction of the Extinct Ecosystem of the Upper Jurassic Morrison Formation. 167 (3): 137–162. Bibcode:2004SedG..167..137P. doi:10.1016/j.sedgeo.2004.01.004. ISSN 0037-0738.
