= William Bullock Clark =

American geologist (1860–1917)

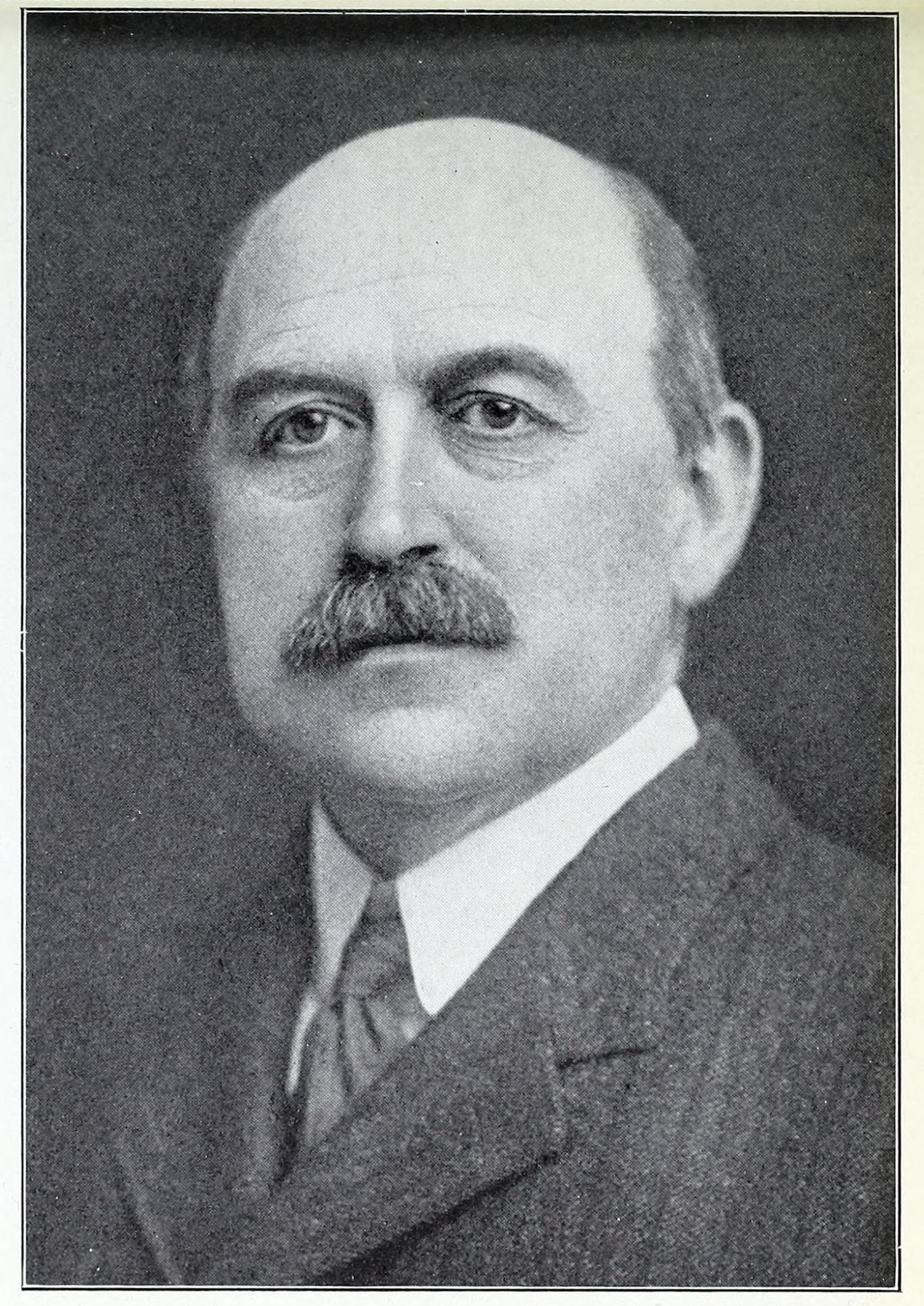
- Clark in 1914 publication
- Born: December 15, 1860; Brattleboro, Vermont, U.S.
- Died: July 27, 1917 (aged 56); North Haven, Maine, U.S.
- Resting place: Druid Ridge Cemetery; Pikesville, Maryland, U.S.
- Education: Amherst College (BA, LLD); Ludwig-Maximilians-Universität München (PhD)
- Spouse: Ellen C. Strong (m. 1892)
- Children: 4
- Scientific career
- Fields: Geology
- Workplaces: Johns Hopkins University

William Bullock Clark (December 15, 1860 – July 27, 1917), was an American geologist.

== Early life ==
William Bullock Clark was born on December 15, 1860, at Brattleboro, Vermont, to Helen (née Bullock) and Barna Atherton Clark. Clark had private tutors and graduated from Brattleboro High School. He graduated with a Bachelor of Arts from Amherst College in 1884. He graduated with a PhD from the Ludwig-Maximilians-Universität München in 1887. Clark graduated from Amherst College with a Doctor of Laws in 1908. He also spent time in the field doing geographical surveys in Great Britain and Prussia.

== Career ==
In 1888 he became connected with the United States Geological Survey. Clark was a professor of geology at Johns Hopkins University who led the department through a period of great growth, during which it awarded forty-six PhDs, twice as many as any other university. He was appointed instructor at Johns Hopkins in 1887, promoted to associate in 1889, and promoted to associate professor in 1892 and professor in 1894. One of these was the first PhD in meteorology ever earned in the United States awarded to Oliver Lanard Fassig. In addition to this, Clark founded and directed both the Maryland State Weather Service (founded in 1891) and the Maryland Geological Survey (1896). Clark served as the State Geologist of Maryland from 1896 to 1917, The State Weather Service was a cooperative venture between Hopkins, the Maryland Agricultural College (now University of Maryland), and the United States Weather Bureau, while the Geological Survey was also a joint effort between the State of Maryland, Hopkins, and the Maryland Agricultural College. In both instances, Johns Hopkins provided facilities and funding for their ongoing support. Clark also served as the State's representative when the Mason–Dixon line was re-surveyed in 1900. He organized and directed Maryland's exhibits at the Pan-American Exposition, Charleston Exposition and the Louisiana Purchase Exposition. In 1904, Clark was appointed to the rehabilitation committee of the burnt district following the Great Baltimore Fire.

Clark was a member of the Maryland State Council. He served as chairman of the committee on national resources. He also served as a member of the Council of National Defense at the time of his death. He served as chairman of the subcommittee on highways and helped draw up plans for troop movement in case of invasion during World War I. He was also appointed by the Secretary of Interior to the Advisory Board on Drainage. Clark also served as executive officer of the Maryland State Forestry commission.

He was elected as a member to the American Philosophical Society in 1902 and the National Academy of Sciences. Clark served as foreign correspondent of the Geological Society of London and was treasurer of the Geological Society of America at the time of his death. He also served as president of the Maryland branch of the National Conservation Association and president of the Children's Aid Society of Baltimore.

== Personal life ==
Clark married Ellen C. Strong of Boston in 1892. They had four children, Edward S., Marion, Atherton and Helen.

In September 1913, Clark had an operation on a twisted intestine. Clark died on July 27, 1917, from a stroke at "Stonecrop", his summer home in North Haven, Maine. He was buried at Druid Ridge Cemetery in Pikesville.

== Legacy ==
For his work at the Johns Hopkins University, one of the dormitories in the Alumni Memorial Residences ("AMRs") has been named after him. The building Clark Hall (also at The Johns Hopkins University), however, is not named after him (Clark Hall is named after donor A. James Clark).
