= James Furman Kemp =

American geologist (1859–1926)

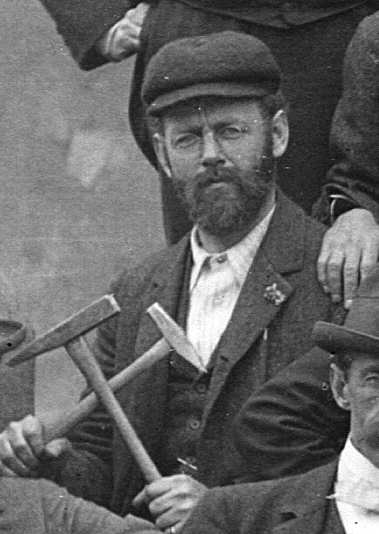
- Born: August 14, 1859; New York City
- Died: November 17, 1926 (aged 67)
- Citizenship: American
- Education: Amherst College, Columbia School of Mines
- Scientific career
- Fields: Geology
- Workplaces: Columbia University, US Geological Survey, New York Botanical Gardens
- Thesis: On the geology of Manhattan Island (1884)
- Doctoral advisor: John Strong Newberry
- Doctoral students: Charles Henry Smyth, Jr. Heinrich Ries

James Furman Kemp (August 14, 1859 – November 17, 1926) was an American geologist.

== Early life ==
He was born in New York City and graduated from Amherst in 1881 and from the Columbia School of Mines in 1884. Amherst gave him an honorary Sc.D. in 1906 and McGill an LL.D. in 1913. Professor Kemp taught at Cornell University from 1886 to 1891 and then at Columbia and served as geologist of the United States and New York State geological surveys of the Adirondack Mountains.

He served as manager and scientific director of the New York Botanical Gardens (after 1898), and lectured on geology at Johns Hopkins, MIT, and McGill.

== Publications ==
Besides numerous articles, reports, and monographs, he published Ore Deposits of the United States and Canada (1893; third edition, rewritten, 1900) and Handbook of Rocks (1896; fifth edition, 1911). Kemp was president of the Geological Society of America in 1921. He was elected to the National Academy of Sciences in 1911, the American Philosophical Society in 1912, and the American Academy of Arts and Sciences in 1921.
