= Geological Society of America =

Nonprofit organization dedicated to geoscience

The Geological Society of America, Inc.
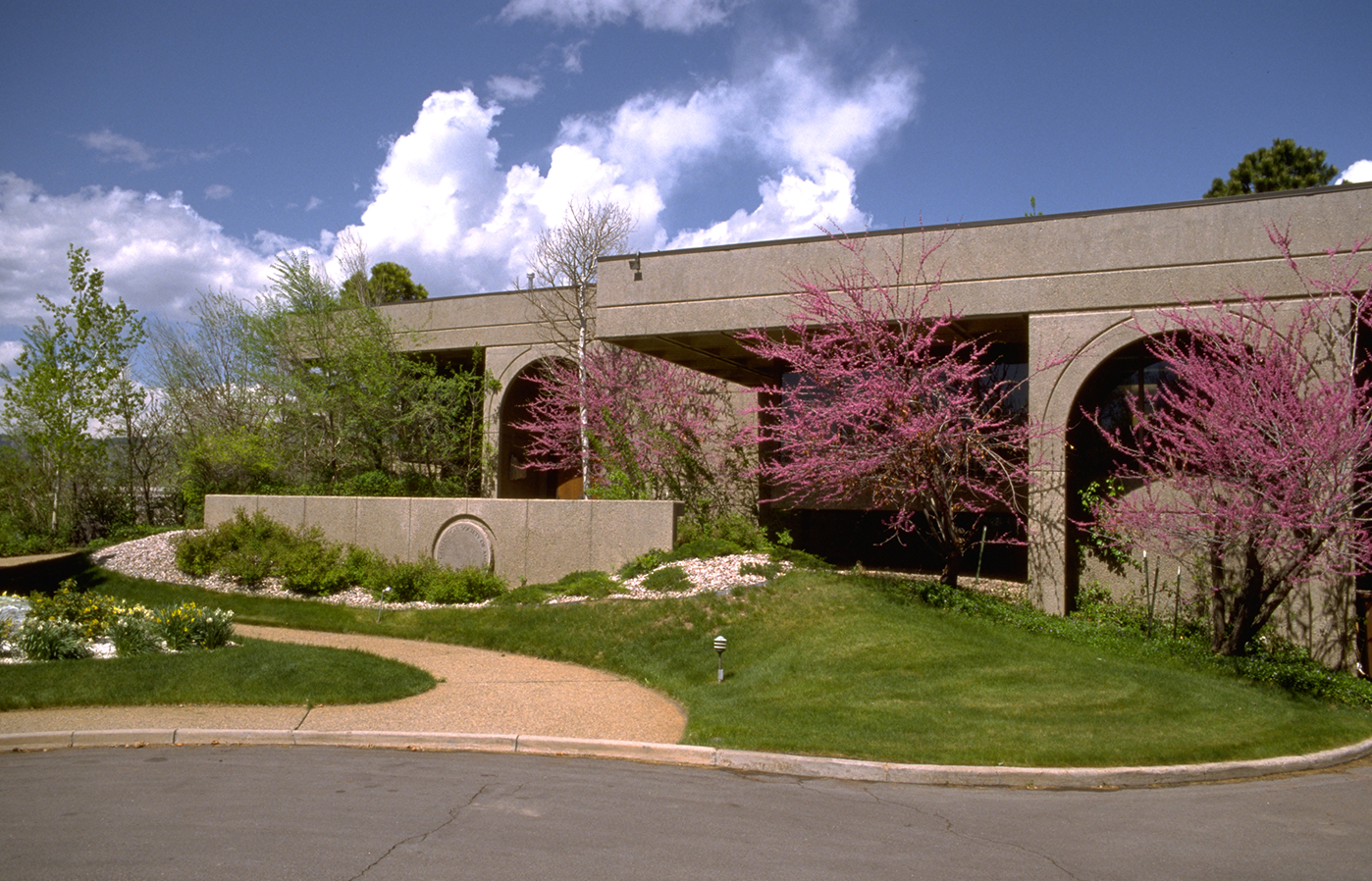
- The GSA headquarters building in Boulder, Colorado, U.S.
- Abbreviation: GSA
- Formation: 1888; 138 years ago
- Type: Scientific society
- Legal status: 501(c)(3) non-profit
- Headquarters: Boulder, Colorado, United States
- Coordinates: 40°02′14.1″N 105°14′59.8″W
- Region served: Worldwide
- Website: geosociety.org

The Geological Society of America (GSA) (Note: In full: The Geological Society of America, Inc.) is a nonprofit organization dedicated to the advancement of the geosciences.

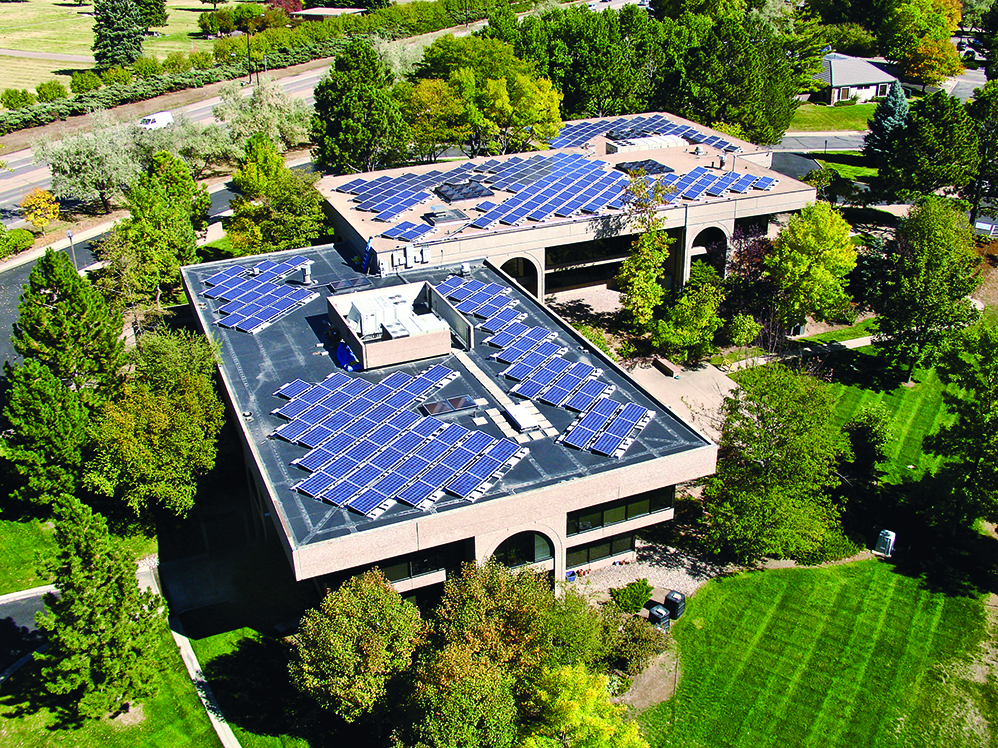
The GSA building in Boulder, Colorado, as seen from above, c. 2013

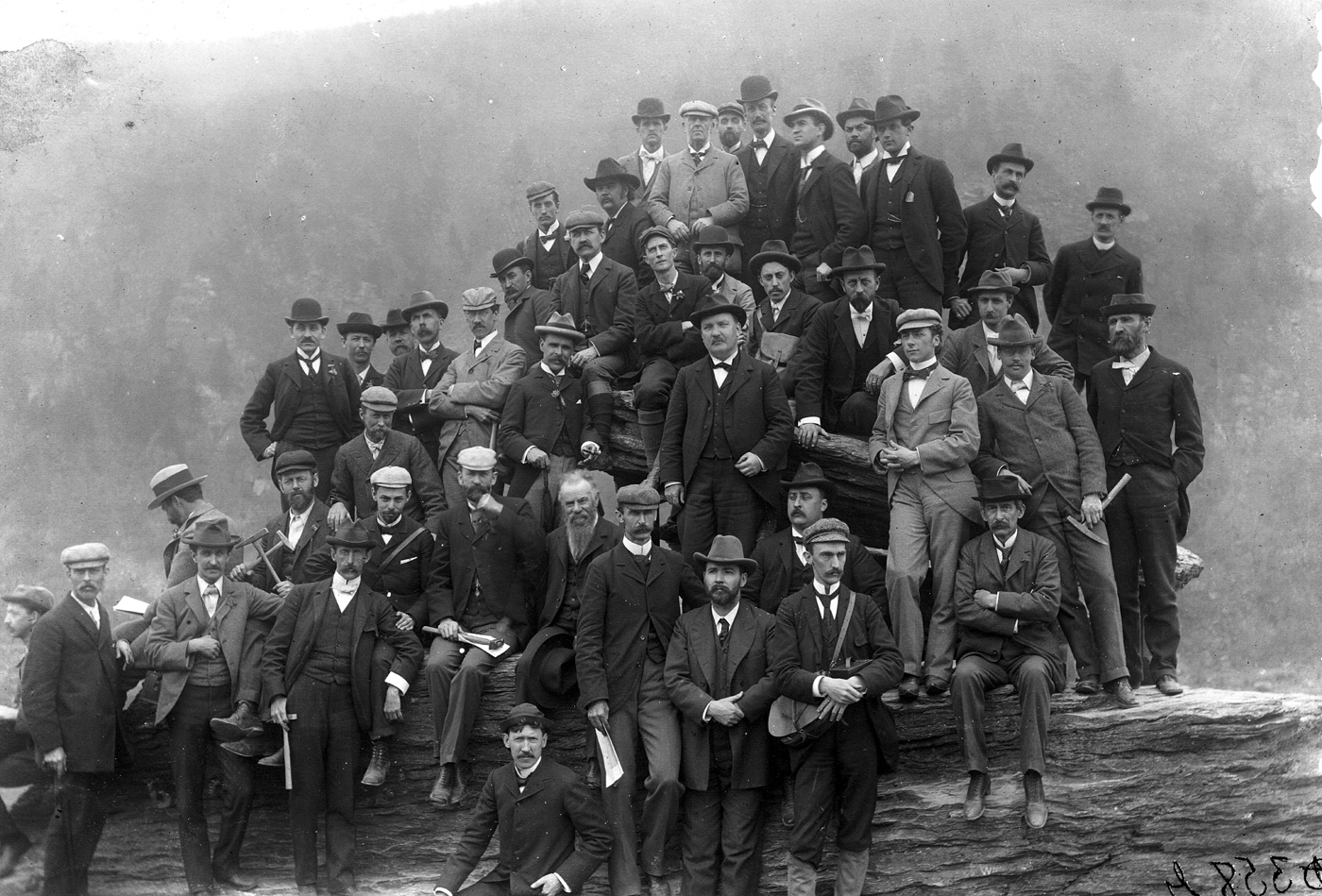
Geological field excursion to Harpers Ferry, West Virginia, April 30, 1897, following the George Huntington Williams Memorial Lectures delivered by Sir Archibald Geikie at Johns Hopkins University. The photograph was taken by Joseph S. Diller at Jefferson Rock, above Harpers Ferry. Individuals in photo include (starting at top): Cleophas C. O'Harra, Sir Archibald Geikie, Frederick H. Newell, Henry B. Kümmel, George Burbank Shattuck, Rollin D. Salisbury, Arthur Clifford Veatch, Louis Marcus Prindle, Harry F. Reid, Charles R. Van Hise, Cleveland Abbe, Jr., George Willis Stose, Thomas Leonard Watson, Edward Vincent D'Invilliers, Clarence Wilbur Dorsey, Frederick J.H. Merrill, Louis A. Bauer, Arthur Coe Spencer, William J. McGee, William B. Clark, Rufus Mather Bagg, Frank Hall Knowlton, Robert T. Hill, Heinrich Ries, Frank D. Adams, Arthur P. Coleman, Timothy William Stanton, Oliver L. Fassig, Samuel F. Emmons, George F. Becker, Albert Berthold Hoen, George O. Smith, James F. Kemp, Bailey Willis, David White, Edward Bennett Mathews, Charles D. Walcott, John W. Powell, Joseph Stanley-Brown, Joseph Austin Holmes, Charles Willard Hayes, Leonidas Chalmers Glenn, Henry S. Williams.

== History ==
The society was founded in Ithaca, New York, in 1888 by Alexander Winchell, John J. Stevenson, Charles H. Hitchcock, John R. Procter and Edward Orton and has been headquartered at 3300 Penrose Place, Boulder, Colorado, US, since 1967.

GSA began with 100 members under its first president, James Hall. In 1889 Mary Emilie Holmes became its first female member. It grew slowly but steadily to 600 members until 1931, when a nearly $4 million endowment from 1930 president R. A. F. Penrose Jr. jumpstarted GSA's growth. As of December 2017, GSA had more than 25,000 members in over 100 countries.

The society has six regional sections in North America and twenty-two scientific divisions. The oldest such regional interest group is the Cordilleran section, which first met December 29–30, 1899 at the California Academy of Sciences in San Francisco. At the time, travel back east was difficult for western geologists during that period of the year. This led to the foundation of a regional geological club.

== Activities ==
The stated mission of GSA is "to advance geoscience research and discovery, service to society, stewardship of Earth, and the geosciences profession". Its main activities are sponsoring scientific meetings and publishing scientific literature, particularly the peer-reviewed journals Geological Society of America Bulletin, published continuously since 1889, and Geology, published since 1973. In 2005, GSA introduced its online-only journal Geosphere, and in February 2009, GSA began publishing Lithosphere (both also peer-reviewed). Geosphere and Lithosphere are open access as of 2018. GSA's monthly news and science magazine, GSA Today, is also open access online. GSA also publishes three book series: Special Papers, Memoirs, and Field Guides. A third major activity is awarding research grants to graduate students.

== Position statements ==
GSA issues Position Statements "in support of and consistent with the GSA's Vision and Mission to develop consensus on significant professional, technical, and societal issues of relevance to the geosciences community. Position Statements, developed and adopted through a well-defined process, provide the basis for statements made on behalf of the GSA before government bodies and agencies and communicated to the media and the general public."

For example, in 2006, the GSA adopted a Position Statement on Global Climate Change:

The Geological Society of America (GSA) supports the scientific conclusions that Earth's climate is changing; the climate changes are due in part to human activities; and the probable consequences of the climate changes will be significant and blind to geopolitical boundaries. Furthermore, the potential implications of global climate change and the time scale over which such changes will likely occur require active, effective, long-term planning.
Current predictions of the consequences of global climate change include: (1) rising sea level, (2) significant alteration of global and regional climatic patterns with an impact on water availability, (3) fundamental changes in global temperature distribution, (4) melting of polar ice, and (5) major changes in the distribution of plant and animal species. While the precise magnitude and rate of climate change cannot be predicted with absolute certainty, significant change will affect the planet and stress its inhabitants.

== Past presidents ==
Past presidents of the Geological Society of America:

- James Hall, 1889
- James Dwight Dana, 1890
- Alexander Winchell, 1891
- Grove Karl "G. K." Gilbert, 1892
- J. William Dawson, 1893
- Thomas C. Chamberlin, 1894
- Nathanial S. Shaler, 1895
- Joseph Le Conte, 1896
- Edward Orton Sr., 1897
- J. J. Stevenson, 1898
- Benjamin K. Emerson, 1899
- George Mercer Dawson, 1900
- Charles D. Walcott, 1901
- N. H. Winchell, 1902
- Samuel F. Emmons, 1903
- John Casper Branner, 1904
- Raphael Pumpelly, 1905
- Israel Cook Russell, 1906
- C. R. Van Hise, 1907
- Samuel Calvin, 1908
- G. K. Gilbert (2nd term), 1909
- Arnold Hague, 1910
- William M. Davis, 1911
- H.L. Fairchild, 1912
- Eugene A. Smith, 1913
- George F. Becker, 1914
- Arthur P. Coleman, 1915
- John M. Clarke, 1916
- Frank D. Adams, 1917
- Whitman Cross, 1918
- J. C. Merriam, 1919
- Israel C. White, 1920
- James F. Kemp, 1921
- Charles Schuchert, 1922
- David White, 1923
- Waldemar Lindgren, 1924
- William B. Scott, 1925
- Andrew Lawson, 1926
- Arthur Keith, 1927
- Bailey Willis, 1928
- Heinrich Ries, 1929
- R.A.F. Penrose Jr., 1930
- Alfred C. Lane, 1931
- Reginald Aldworth Daly, 1932
- C. K. Leith, 1933
- W. H. Collins, 1934
- Nevin M. Fenneman, 1935
- W. C. Mendenhall, 1936
- Charles Palache, 1937
- Arthur Louis Day, 1938
- T. Wayland Vaughan, 1939
- Eliot Blackwelder, 1940
- Charles P. Berkey, 1941
- Douglas W. Johnson, 1942
- E. L. Bruce, 1943
- Adolph Knopf, 1944
- Edward W. Berry, 1945
- Norman L. Bowen, 1946
- A. I. Levorsen, 1947
- James Gilluly, 1948
- Chester Ray Longwell, 1949
- William Walden Rubey, 1950
- Chester Stock, 1951
- Thomas S. Lovering, 1952
- Wendell P. Woodring, 1953
- Ernst Cloos, 1954
- Walter H. Bucher, 1955
- George S. Hume, 1956
- Richard J. Russell, 1957
- Raymond Cecil Moore, 1958
- Marland P. Billings, 1959
- Hollis Dow Hedberg, 1960
- Thomas B. Nolan, 1961
- M. King Hubbert 1962
- Harry H. Hess 1963
- Francis Birch 1964
- Wilmot H. Bradley 1965
- Robert Ferguson Legget 1966
- Konrad B. Krauskopf 1967
- Ian Campbell, 1968
- Morgan J. Davis, 1969
- John Rodgers, 1970
- Richard H. Jahns, 1971
- Luna Leopold, 1972
- John C. Maxwell, 1973
- Clarence R. Allen, 1974
- Julian R. Goldsmith, 1975
- Robert E. Folinsbee, 1976
- Charles L. Drake, 1977
- Peter T. Flawn, 1978
- Leon T. Silver, 1979
- Laurence L. Sloss, 1980
- Howard R. Gould, 1981
- Digby J. McLaren, 1982
- Paul A. Bailly, 1983
- M. Gordon Wolman, 1984
- Brian J. Skinner, 1985
- W. Gary Ernst, 1986
- Jack E. Oliver, 1987
- Albert W. Bally, 1988
- Randolph Bromery, 1989
- Raymond A. Price, 1990
- Doris Malkin Curtis, 1991
- E-An Zen, 1992
- Robert D. Hatcher, 1993
- William R. Dickinson, 1994
- David A. Stephenson, 1995
- Eldridge M. Moores, 1996
- George A. Thompson, 1997
- Victor R. Baker, 1998
- Gail M. Ashley, 1999
- Mary Lou Zoback, 2000
- Sharon Mosher, 2001
- Anthony J. Naldrett, 2002
- B. Clark Burchfiel, 2003
- Rob Van der Voo, 2004
- William A. Thomas, 2005
- Stephen G. Wells, 2006
- John M. "Jack" Sharp Jr., 2007
- Judith Totman Parrish, 2008
- Jean M. Bahr, 2009
- Joaquin Ruiz, 2010
- John Geissman, 2011
- George H. Davis, 2012
- Suzanne Mahlburg Kay, 2013
- Harry "Hap" McSween, 2014
- Jonathan G. Price, 2015
- Claudia I. Mora, 2016
- Isabel P. Montañez, 2017
- Robbie Gries, 2018
- Donald I. Siegel, 2019
- J. Douglas Walker, 2020
- Barbara Dutrow, 2021
- Mark G. Little, 2022
- Christopher "Chuck" Bailey, 2023
- Carmala N. Garzione, 2024
- Nathan A. Niemi, 2025

== See also ==
- Penrose Medal
- Arthur L. Day Medal
- Meinzer Award
- Kirk Bryan Award
- G K Gilbert Award
- Florence Bascom
- Mary C. Rabbitt
- Doris M. Curtis Outstanding Woman in Science Award
