= Arville Irving Levorsen =

American geologist

Arville Irving Levorsen (1894–1965) was an American geologist. He served as the dean of the School of Mineral Sciences at Stanford University.
