= Richard H. Jahns =

Richard H. Jahns was an American geologist who served as president of the Geological Society of America. In 1981, he was named a fellow of the American Association for the Advancement of Science.
