= Oliver Lanard Fassig =

American meteorologist and climatologist

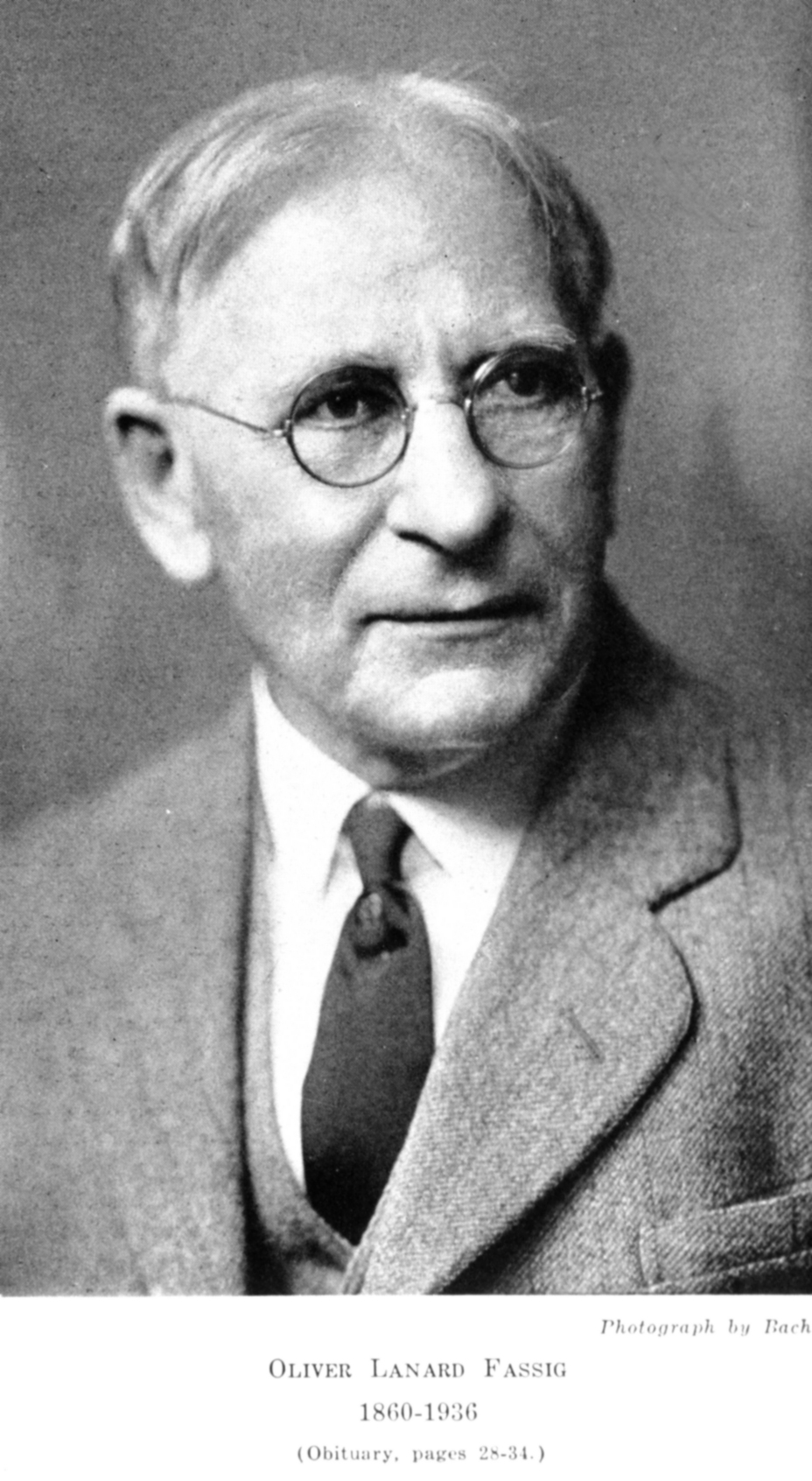
- Born: April 5, 1860; Columbus, Ohio
- Died: December 6, 1936 (aged 76); Washington, D.C.
- Education: Ohio State University, Johns Hopkins University
- Scientific career
- Fields: Meteorology, Climatology, Bibliography
- Workplaces: United States Weather Bureau

Oliver Lanard Fassig (April 5, 1860 – December 6, 1936) was an American meteorologist and climatologist who worked for the United States Weather Bureau initially as part of the Signal Corps of the United States War Department and later affiliated with the United States Department of Agriculture.

Oliver Lanard Fassig was born at Columbus, Ohio, on April 5, 1860, son of Mathias and Elizabeth (Lanard) Fassig. He attended Ohio State University and received a Bachelor of Science degree in 1882. He then studied at Johns Hopkins University under the guidance of American geologist William Bullock Clark, where in 1899 he received the first PhD in meteorology ever earned in the United States. His doctoral thesis was on the broad pressure relations of distinctive types of March weather over North America. On September 14, 1898, he married Ann Green McCoy, of Annapolis, Maryland.

== Meteorological service ==
Fassig's official meteorological service began on January 12, 1883, when he entered the Signal Corps of the United States War Department in Washington, D.C. In May 1883, he was assigned to Fort Myer in Arlington County, Virginia, for instruction, but returned to the Central Office for duty in January 1884. In December 1885, he was sent to New Haven, Connecticut, to work as an assistant and study electrical methods at Yale University. In August 1887 he returned to the Central Office in Washington, D.C., where he worked as a bibliographer and librarian from June 1888 to February 1896. In 1889, he published an extensive bibliography titled the “Bibliography of Meteorology – A classed catalogue of the printed literature of meteorology from the origin of printing to the close of 1881”. He then served as an assistant in Philadelphia, Baltimore, and at Mount Weather, which is located in the Blue Ridge Mountains of Virginia. He was made chairman of the section on History and Bibliography of the International Meteorological Congress, Chicago in 1893. His contacts with meteorologists from abroad led him to take a year's leave of absence to study in Germany, 1896-7, where he took special courses at the University of Berlin and became a member of the German Meteorological Society. He was in charge of the Baltimore station from June 5, 1900, to July 14, 1905; May 31, 1907, to April 2, 1909, and August 10, 1912, to April 14, 1919. While in Baltimore, he gave instruction in meteorology at the Johns Hopkins University and wrote "The Climate and Weather of Baltimore". He was in charge of the station at San Juan, Puerto Rico, from April 2, 1909, to August 10, 1912, and April 14, 1919, to June 10, 1930, where he had general charge of the West Indian and Caribbean service. On leaving San Juan he came once more to the Central Office, this time as Chief of the Climatological Division, which position he retained until his retirement on June 30, 1932.

Fassig was a quiet, unassuming, unhurried scientist. His interests embraced many phases of science. Absolute fairness and sympathetic understanding characterized his dealings not only with his equals but with those under him. He had the courage to do what he thought right even at considerable personal sacrifice, as when he refused to enter politics on behalf of his chief.

Fassig died at the Emergency Hospital in Washington, D.C., on Sunday evening, December 6, 1936, as a result of being struck by an automobile on November 20, 1936.

== List of publications ==
- Fassig, O.L. 1889. Bibliography of Meteorology. United States of America War Department, Signal Office, Washington DC, 475 pp.
- Fassig, O.L. 1893. Proceedings of the meteorological congress held at Chicago August 21–24, 1893. Monthly Weather Review 21(8):227.
- Fassig, O.L. 1895. Statistics of state weather services. Monthly Weather Review 23(6):209-212
- Fassig, O.L. 1896. Automatic cloud photography. Monthly Weather Review 24(12):456-457.
- Fassig, O.L. 1896. Report of the International Meteorological Congress, held at Chicago, Il1inois, August 21–24, 1893, under the auspices of the Congress Auxiliary of the World's Columbian Exposition. United States Department of Agriculture, Weather Bureau Bulletin No. 11, Part 2, 378 pp.
- Fassig, O.L. 1897. The Ninth Annual Convention of the Association of German Agricultural Experiment Stations, 1896. United States Department of Agriculture, Office of Experiment Stations, Experiment Station Record 8(6):447-453.
- Fassig, O.L. 1898. Meteorology at Johns Hopkins University. Monthly Weather Review 26(7):306-306.
- Fassig, O.L. 1899. Types of March weather in the United States. The relations existing between mean atmospheric pressure, the prevailing character of the weather, and the paths of storms. Doctoral thesis, Johns Hopkins University, Baltimore, 340 pp.
- Fassig, O.L. 1899. Types of March weather in the United States. The relations existing between mean atmospheric pressure, the prevailing character of the weather, and the paths of storms. The American Journal of Science, Fourth Series, 8(47):319-338.
- Fassig, O.L. 1899. A sketch of the progress of meteorology in Maryland and Delaware. In: Clark, W.M. (ed), Maryland Weather Service, Vol. I, pp. 331–416.
- Fassig, O.L. 1900. The climate of Allegany County. In: Clark, W.M. (ed), Allegany County. Maryland Geological Survey. Baltimore: The Johns Hopkins Press, pp. 217–231.
- Fassig, O.L. 1901. The westward movement of the daily barometric wave. Monthly Weather Review 29(11):495-496.
- Fassig, O.L. 1902. The westward movement of the daily barometric wave. In: Berry, J. and Phillips, W.F.R. (eds), Proceedings of the Second Convention of Weather Bureau Officials held at Milwaukee, Wis., August 27,28, 29,1901. U.S. Department of Agriculture, Weather Bureau, Bulletin No. 31, pp. 62–65.
- Fassig, O.L. 1902. Maryland climatological studies. In: Berry, J. and Phillips, W.F.R. (eds), Proceedings of the Second Convention of Weather Bureau Officials held at Milwaukee, Wis., August 27,28, 29,1901. U.S. Department of Agriculture, Weather Bureau, Bulletin No. 31, pp. 200–202.
- Fassig, O.L. 1902. The climate of Cecil County. In: Clark, W.M. (ed), Cecil County. Maryland Geological Survey. Baltimore: The Johns Hopkins Press, pp. 249–261.
- Fassig, O.L. 1902. The climate of Garrett County. In: Clark, W.M. (ed), Garrett County. Maryland Geological Survey. Baltimore: The Johns Hopkins Press, pp. 253–273.
- Fassig, O.L. 1902. A waterspout at close range. Monthly Weather Review 30(6):302-302.
- Fassig, O.L. 1903. The meteorological work of the expedition to the Bahamas. Monthly Weather Review 31(7):320-320.
- Fassig, O.L. 1903. Kite flying in the tropics. Monthly Weather Review 31(12):582-587.
- Fassig, O.L. 1905. Climate of the Bahama Islands. In: Shattuck, G.B. (ed), The Bahama Islands, London: MacMillan, pp. 111–125.
- Fassig, O.L. 1905. Exploration of the upper atmosphere at Nassau, New Providence, by means of kites. In: Shattuck, G.B. (ed), The Bahama Islands, London: MacMillan, pp. 129–143.
- Fassig, O.L. 1905. Magnetic observations in the Bahama Islands. In: Shattuck, G.B. (ed), The Bahama Islands, London: MacMillan, pp. 99–108.
- Fassig, O.L. 1905. The Ziegler Relief Expedition. Monthly Weather Review 33(10):438-438.
- Fassig, O.L. 1906. Kite flight of April 5, 1906, at Mount Weather Observatory. Monthly Weather Review 34(3):125-126.
- Fassig, O.L. 1907. The climate and weather of Baltimore. In: Clark, W.B. (ed), Maryland Weather Service, Special Publication 11, Baltimore: Johns Hopkins Press, 515 pp.
- Fassig, O.L. 1907. The use of kites and balloons in the U. S. Weather Bureau. In: Navigating the Air. The Aero Club of America, New York: Doubleday, Page & Co., pp. 204–212.
- Fassig, O.L. 1907. Guilbert's rules for weather prediction. Monthly Weather Review 35(5):210-211.
- Moore, W.L., Humphreys, W.J. and Fassig, O.L. 1907. New problems of the weather. Yearbook of the United States Department of Agriculture 1906, pp. 121–124.
- Fassig, O.L. 1909. Average annual rainfall of Porto Rico, West Indies. Monthly Weather Review 37(11):982-986.
- Fassig, O.L. 1911. The normal temperature of Porto Rico, West Indies. Monthly Weather Review 39(2):299-302.
- Fassig, O.L. 1911. The trade winds in Porto Rico. Monthly Weather Review 39(5):796-799.
- Fassig, O.L. 1911. The climate of Porto Rico, West Indies. United States Department of Agriculture, Weather Bureau Bulletin, 20 pp.
- Fassig, O.L. 1913. Hurricanes of the West Indies. United States Department of Agriculture, Weather Bureau, Bulletin 10, pp. 7–28.
- Fassig, O.L. 1914. Period of safe plant growth in Maryland and Delaware. Monthly Weather Review 42(3):152-158.
- Fassig, O.L. 1915. A revolving cloud camera. Monthly Weather Review 43(6):274-275.
- Fassig, O.L. 1915. A remarkable fall of hail in Maryland. Monthly Weather Review 43(9):446-448
- Fassig, O.L. 1916. Tropical rains - their duration, frequency, and intensity. Monthly Weather Review 44(6):329-337.
- Fassig, O.L. 1917. The climate of Anne Arundel County. In: Clark, W.M. (ed), Anne Arundel County. Maryland Geological Survey. Baltimore: The Johns Hopkins Press, pp. 175–192.
- Fassig, O.L. 1917. Tropical rains - their duration, frequency, and intensity. In: Proceedings of the Second Pan American Scientific Congress, Washington, U.S.A., Vol. II, pp. 460–473
- Fassig, O.L. 1918. A signal corps school of meteorology. Monthly Weather Review 46(12):560-562.
- Fassig, O.L. 1919. The work of the U. S. Weather bureau in the West Indies. Monthly Weather Review 47(12):850-851.
- Fassig, O.L. 1924. Pilot-balloon observations at San Juan, Porto Rico. Monthly Weather Review 52(1):22-22.
- Fassig, O.L. 1925. Rainfall and temperature of Cuba. Washington DC: Tropical Plant Research Foundation, 32 pp.
- Fassig, O.L. 1928. San Felipe - The hurricane of September 13, 1928, at San Juan, P. R. Monthly Weather Review 56(9):350-352.
- Fassig, O.L. 1929. A tentative chart of annual rainfall over the island of Haiti-Santo Domingo. Monthly Weather Review 57(7):296-296.
- Fassig, O.L. 1929. Discussion. Monthly Weather Review 57(8):331-332. (Note: Tropical cyclones in Puerto Rico)
- Fassig, O.L. 1930. On the frequency of hurricanes in the vicinity of Porto Rico. Monthly Weather Review 58(8):326-327.
