= Spalding, Missouri =

Unincorporated community in Missouri, United States

Coordinates: 39°37′07″N 91°31′36″W

Spalding is an unincorporated community in Ralls County, in the U.S. state of Missouri.

== History ==
A post office called Spalding was established in 1882, and remained in operation until 1910. The community took its name from a spring near the original town site; Spalding Springs in turn had the name of Robert M. Spalding, a pioneer settler.
