= Ole Vig =

Norwegian teacher, poet, non-fiction writer and magazine editor

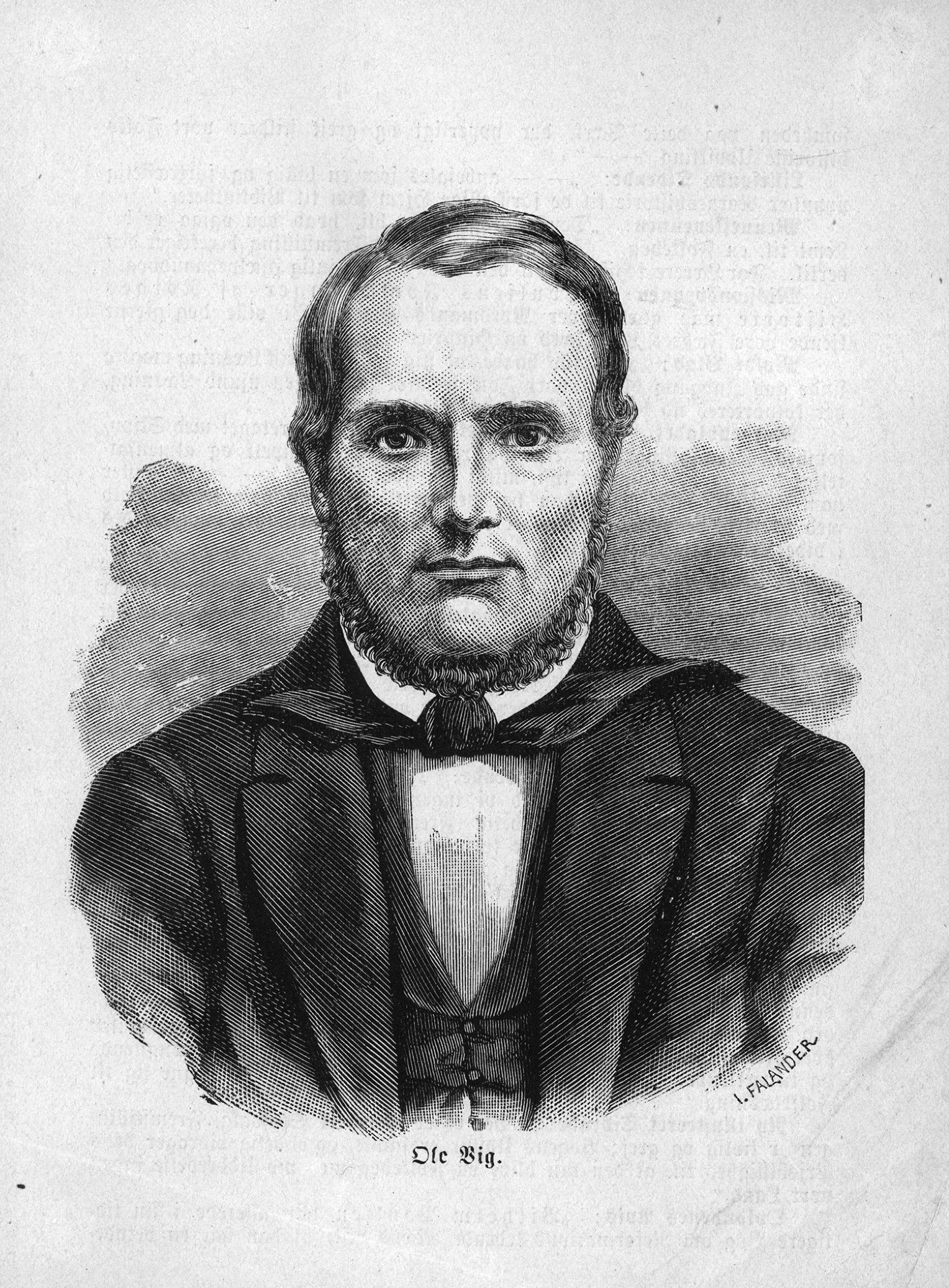
- Born: 6 February 1824
- Died: 19 December 1857 (aged 33)
- Occupations: teacher, poet, non-fiction writer, magazine editor
- Known for: early proponent of universal public education

Ole Vig (6 February 1824 – 19 December 1857) was a Norwegian teacher, poet, non-fiction writer, magazine editor. He is remembered today primarily as an early proponent of universal public education.

== Biography ==
Vig grew up on a farm (Vikmarken under gården Vikan) near the village of Kvithammer in Nordre Trondheim county, Norway. He was the son of Ole Olsen Viganaasen and Marit Nielsdatter Walstad. He attended school in Klæbu and graduated in 1843. After graduation, Vig worked as a private tutor for the family of a parish priest at Åfjord Church (1843–1845). He subsequently held a teaching position in Kristiansund.

From 1851 to 1857, he served as editor of the magazine Folkevennen, which was published between the years 1852–1900 by the Norwegian literary society, Selskabet for folkeoplysningens fremme. He also published the poetry collection Norske Bondeblomster in 1851, and the history book Norges historie indtil Harald Haarfagre in 1857. His poem and national hymn (Blandt alle Lande) was published in Salmer og Sange til Brug ved Skolelærer-Møde from 1854.

Vig suffered from the effects of tuberculosis. He died at age 34 just before Christmas 1857. He was buried Christmas Eve at Vår Frelsers gravlund in Oslo.

== Ole Vig-prisen ==
Since 1979, the Ole Vig Prize (Ole Vig-prisen) has been awarded annually to the Norwegian youth between the ages of 20 and 35 years who has made an outstandingly cultural effort in the spirit of Ole Vig.

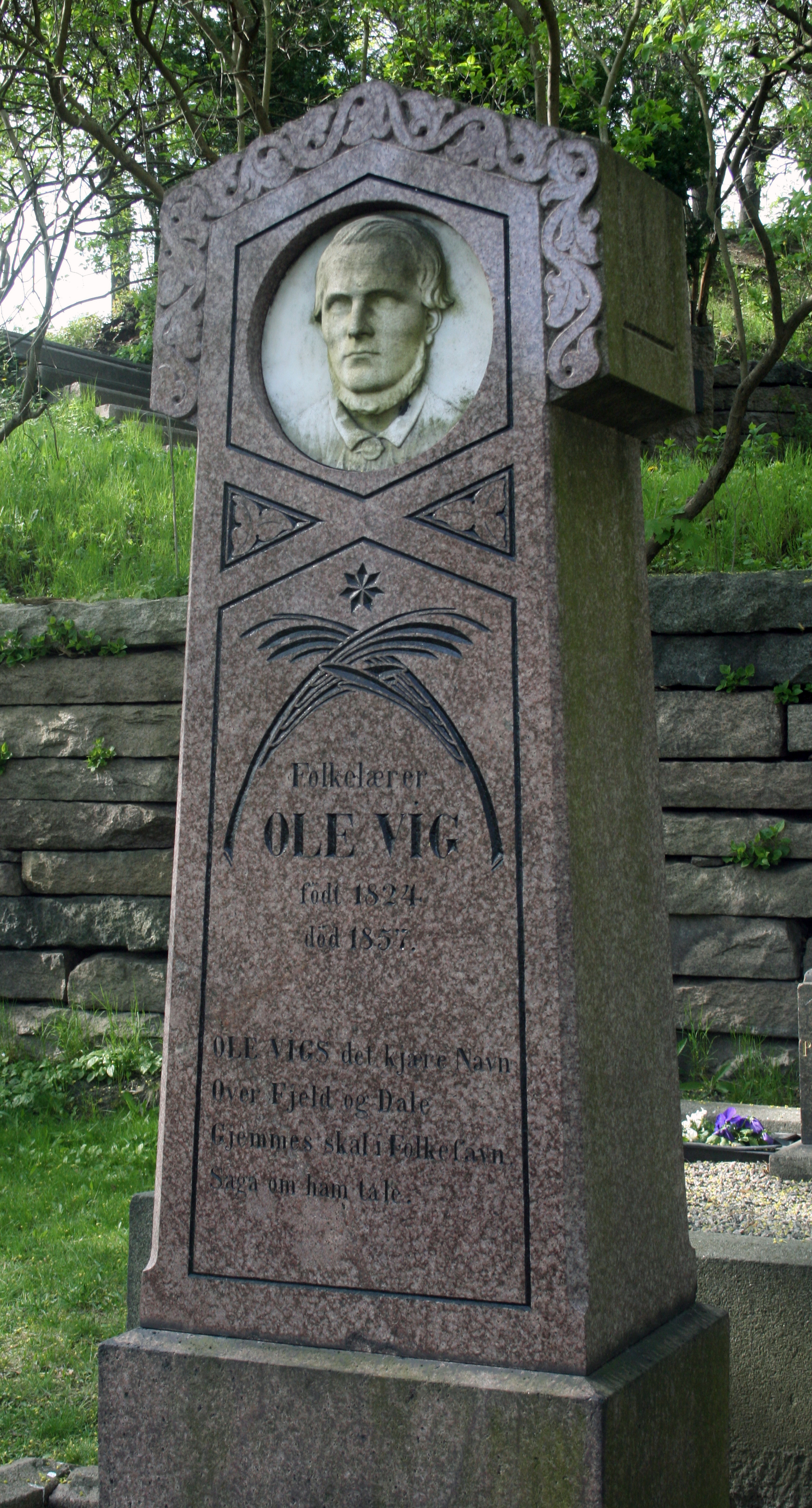
Ole Vig's gravemarker at Vår Frelsers gravlund in Oslo

== Selected works ==
- Norske Bondeblomster (1851)
- Liv i Norge (1851)
- Sange og Rim for det norske Folk (1854)
- Norges historie indtil Harald Haarfager (1857)

== Related reading ==
- Eskeland, Lars (1915) Ole Vig (Bergen, Norway: Bokreidar Lunde & Co.)
- Høverstad, Torstein Bugge (1953) Ole Vig; ein norrøn uppsedar (Hamar, Norway; Forlag Norrøn Livskunst)
