= Waldemar Christofer Brøgger (geologist) =

Norwegian geologist and mineralogist

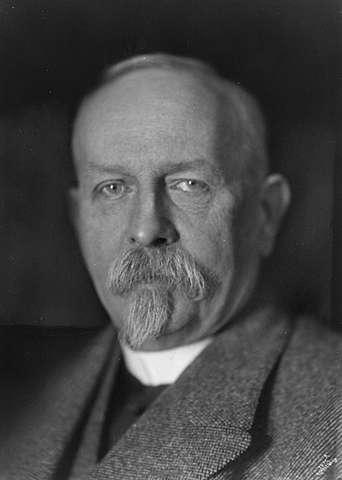
- Brøgger in 1922
- Born: 10 November 1851; Oslo, Norway
- Died: 17 February 1940 (aged 88); Oslo, Norway
- Education: University of Oslo
- Known for: Formation of rocks
- Awards: Murchison Medal (1891); Wollaston Medal (1911); Fellow of the Royal Society
- Scientific career
- Fields: geology
- Workplaces: Stockholm University
- Doctoral students: Victor Moritz Goldschmidt

Waldemar Christofer Brøgger ForMemRS FRSE (10 November 1851 – 17 February 1940) was a Norwegian geologist and mineralogist. His research on Permian igneous rocks (286 to 245 million years ago) of the Oslo district greatly advanced petrologic theory on the formation of rocks.

== Biography ==
He was born in Christiania (now Oslo), Norway. He was the son of Anton Wilhelm Brøgger (1820–1882) and Oline (“Lina”) Marie Bjerring (1826–1905). He attended Oslo Cathedral School and graduated in 1870. He studied science and zoology under Theodor Kjerulf at University of Christiania (now University of Oslo). He was Cand. filos. (1870) and delivered his dissertation in 1875. Brøgger was then immediately employed in the Norwegian Geological Survey as an assistant. In the winter of 1875–76, he made a study trip together with fellow student Hans Reusch (1852–1922) to Corsica and Elba. The two jointly published an illustrated work, Jættegryder ved Christiania (Copenhagen. 1874) which was also published in German and English.

He became an amanuensis at the Stockholm University mineral cabinet (1876) and research fellow (1878). From 1881 to 1890, he was professor of mineralogy and geology at Stockholm University. From 1890 to 1916 was Professor of Mineralogy and Palaeontology in the University of Christiania. He was Dean of the Faculty of Mathematics and Natural Sciences (1899-1902) and became rector of the senate of University of Christiania (1907-1911).

His observations on the igneous rocks of South Tyrol compared with those of Christiania afford much information on the relations of the granitic and basic rocks. The subject of the differentiation of rock-types in the process of solidification as plutonic or volcanic rocks from a particular magma received much attention from him. He dealt also with the Palaeozoic rocks of Norway, and with the late glacial and post-glacial changes of sea level in the Christiania region.

He is credited for proposing that pegmatites form through the interaction of silicate melt and supercritical water. Credit for this discovery is often given to Richard H. Jahns.

== Selected works ==
- Jættegryder ved Christiania (with Hans Reusch. 1874)
- Paradoxidesskifrene ved Krekling (1878)
- Die Mineralien der Syenitpegmatitgänge der südnorwegischen Augit- und Nephelinsyenite (1890)
- Fridtjof Nansen 1861–1893 (with Nordahl Rolfsen, 1896)

== Awards ==
In 1895 Brøgger was appointed a knight of the 1st class in the Order of St. Olav and was in 1902 promoted to commander with a star. He was awarded the Grand Cross of the Order of the White Rose of Finland, was commander of the first class of the Swedish Order of the North Star and a knight of the Order of Dannebrog. He was a member of the Royal Swedish Academy of Sciences from 1890 and a fellow of the Royal Society.

The honorary degree of Ph.D. was conferred upon him by the University of Heidelberg and that of LL.D. by the University of Glasgow in 1901. He was awarded the Murchison Medal in 1891 and the Wollaston Medal in 1911, both by the Geological Society of London.

== Personal life ==
He was married in 1878 to Antonie Sophie Wilhelmine Scheel Siewers (1854–1933). He died in Oslo in 1940 and was buried at Vår Frelsers gravlund. Brøgger's son, Anton Wilhelm Brøgger (1851–1940), was a politician. Anton Wilhelm's son, writer Waldemar Christofer Brøgger (1911–1991), was named after his grandfather.

Academic offices
Preceded by first rector	Rectors of the University of Oslo; 1907–1911	Succeeded by Bredo Henrik von Munthe af Morgenstierne
