= Chemical Geology =

International peer-reviewed academic journal

- Discipline: Geochemistry
- Language: English

Publication details
- History: 1966–present
- Publisher: Elsevier

Standard abbreviations
- ISO 4: Chem. Geol.

Indexing
- ISSN: 0009-2541

Links
- Journal homepage

Chemical Geology is an international peer-reviewed academic journal. The journal is affiliated with the European Association of Geochemistry and it is published by Elsevier., publishing both subscription and open access articles. The journal is a hybrid open-access journal.

Chemical Geology publishes original research papers on isotopic and elemental geochemistry, geochronology and cosmochemistry.

The journal focuses on chemical processes in igneous, metamorphic, and sedimentary petrology, low- and high-temperature aqueous solutions, biogeochemistry, the environment and cosmochemistry.
