= Anton Wilhelm Brøgger (printer) =

Norwegian book printer (1820–1882)

Anton Wilhelm Brøgger (14 March 1820 – 10 April 1882) was a Norwegian book printer.

== Personal life ==
Brøgger was born to Niels Christian Brøgger (1783–1827) and Frideriche Bader (1791–1864) in Kristiansand, Aust-Agder. His only brother was Christian Fredrik Brøgger (1814–74). In 1848, Brøgger married Oline Marie Bjerring (1826–1905), with whom he had a son, Waldemar Christofer Brøgger (1851–1940).

== Career ==
In 1827, Brøgger's family moved to Christiania. His father died the same year. At the age of 16, Brøgger became an apprentice at the publishing company Guldberg & Dzwonkowski. In 1842, he finished his apprenticeship and became a factor at the concern run by the Wulfsberg printing and bookselling family.

In 1851, he rented the premises of Guldberg & Dzwonkowski and started his own printing house, A. W. Brøggers Bogtrykkeri. The following year, Brøgger started a partnership with typographer Johan Arnoldus von Westen Sylow Koren Christie (1821–92). From 1851 to 1866, A. W. Brøggers Bogtrykkeri published the gazette Illustreret Nyhetsblad. Among its contributors were Peter Christen Asbjørnsen, P. A. Munch, Andreas Munch, Jørgen Moe and Ole Vig.

The daily newspaper Christiania-Posten was printed by Brøgger's printing house. In 1860, A. W. Brøggers Bogtrykkeri printed the yearbooks of the Norwegian Academy of Science and Letters. It also published several Norwegian academic and scientific publications and, in 1863, textbooks for Jørgen Wright Cappelen.

Christie left the printing house in 1872. When Brøgger died ten years later, his wife took over the business. After her death in 1905, their son Waldemar Christofer and daughter Thora Brøgger continued to run it. The printing house ceased operations in 1981.
