= Jan Brøgger =

Norwegian professor of social anthropology and clinical psychologist

Jan Christian Brøgger (January 13, 1936, in Paris, France – February 28, 2006, in Oslo, Norway) was a Norwegian professor of social anthropology and a clinical psychologist. He was one of the most well-known Norwegian academics of his generation.

He first worked together with the internationally more notable Fredrik Barth at the University of Bergen. Brøgger later travelled to Cornell University where he studied under Victor Turner. He received his PhD in 1970 at the University of Oslo. From 1969 to 1974 he was curator at the Ethnographic museum of Oslo. Jan Brøgger became full professor in social anthropology at the University of Trondheim (later NTNU) in 1975, a position he held until he died in 2006. He was also dean of studies at the Faculty of humanities at NTNU. He did fieldwork in Italy, Ethiopia, the Sudan, Portugal, and Malaysia.

Jan Brøgger was probably most known as an active participant in the Norwegian public sphere for several decades. He was a popular lecturer and regular columnist in national newspapers. His initial notability was due to his strongly anti-Communist/anti-radical stance in a university environment where this was unconventional, with several books (in Norwegian only) published. Brøgger also published on a variety of topics.

== Selected publications ==
- Aspen, Harald; Carla Dahl-Jørgensen; Bjørn Erring; Anne K. Larsen (1995). The Family : anthropological approaches : festschrift to professor Jan Brøgger. Tapir. ISBN 82-519-1215-6.
- Brøgger, Jan (1992). Nazaré : women and men in a prebureaucratic Portuguese fishing village. Harcourt Brace Jovanovich College Publ. ISBN 0-03-043382-7.
- Brøgger, Jan (1986). Belief and experience among the Sidamo : a case study towards an anthropology of knowledge. Norwegian University Press. ISBN 82-00-07710-1.
- Brøgger, Jan (1971). Montevarese. A study of peasant society and culture in Southern Italy. Scandinavian university books. Archived from the original on 2012-02-04.
- Brøgger, Jan (1971). Frihetens banemenn ('Executioners of liberty'). Cappelen. ISBN 82-02-03766-2.
