= Charles G. Groat =

American geologist (1940–2025)

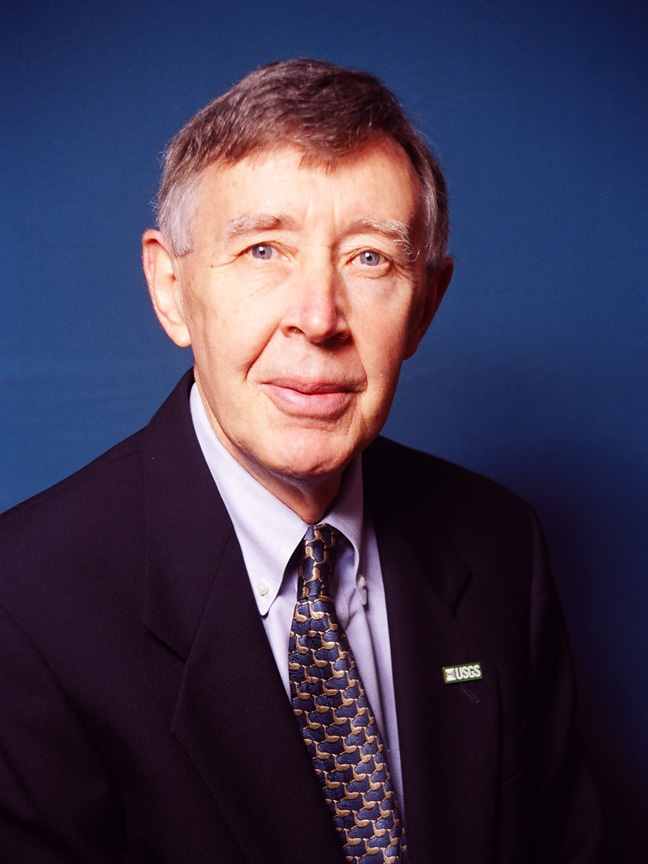
- Groat as Director of USGS, 1998–2005

13th Director of the United States Geological Survey
- In office 1998 – 2005
- Preceded by: Gordon P. Eaton
- Succeeded by: Mark Myers

Personal details
- Born: March 25, 1940 Westfield, New York, US
- Died: March 14, 2025 (aged 84) Baton Rouge, Louisiana, US
- Scientific career
- Education: University of Rochester; University of Massachusetts Amherst; University of Texas at Austin.
- Fields: Geology
- Workplaces: University of Texas at Austin; Louisiana State University; Louisiana Geological Survey; U.S. Geological Survey
- Thesis: Geology of Presidio Bolson, Presidio County, Texas, and adjacent Chihuahua, Mexico (1970)

Charles G. "Chip" Groat (March 25, 1940 – March 14, 2025) was an American geologist and the 13th director of the U.S. Geological Survey. He was a professional in the earth science community with involvement in geological studies, energy and minerals resource assessment, ground-water occurrence and protection, geomorphic processes and landform evolution in desert areas, and coastal studies.

== Education and career ==
Chip Groat was born in Westfield, New York on March 25, 1940. He received a Bachelor of Arts degree in Geology (1962) from the University of Rochester, a Master of Science in Geology (1967) from the University of Massachusetts Amherst, and a PhD in Geology (1970) from the University of Texas at Austin.

Dr. Groat served as associate professor (1976–1978) at the University of Texas at Austin, in the Department of Geological Sciences, and as both Associate and acting director of the Bureau of Economic Geology. From 1978 to 1990, Dr. Groat held positions at Louisiana State University including professor for the Department of Geology and Geophysics; and at the Louisiana Department of Natural Resources including assistant to the Secretary of the Louisiana Department of Natural Resources (1983–1988) and later as Director and State Geologist for the Louisiana Geological Survey.

Groat was executive director (1990–1992) for the American Geological Institute. He served as executive director (1992–1995) at the Center for Coastal, Energy, and Environmental Resources, at Louisiana State University. From May to November 1998, he served as Associate Vice President for Research and Sponsored Projects at the University of Texas at El Paso, following three years as Director of the Center for Environmental Resource Management. He was also Director of the university's Environmental Science and Engineering Ph.D. Program and a professor of Geological Sciences.

Dr. Groat became the 13th Director of the U.S. Geological Survey (USGS) on November 13, 1998. He was appointed by President Bill Clinton and retained by President George W. Bush. Groat resigned as Director on June 17, 2005. As Director, he oversaw national research on energy resources, water policy, and environmental sustainability.

In 1998, Groat was awarded the American Geosciences Institute (AGI) Campbell Medal for Superlative Service to the Geosciences. This Medal is presented each year to a nationally recognized geoscientist with a distinguished record of significant achievements in science, education, and administration, in support of the profession of geology and its role in society. It is AGI’s most distinguished award.

After leaving the USGS, he returned to the University of Texas at Austin to direct the Energy and Earth Resources Graduate Program and the Center for International Energy and Environmental Policy In July 2008, the University of Texas at Austin named him interim dean of the Jackson School of Geosciences.

Among his many professional affiliations, Groat was a member of the Geological Society of America, American Association for the Advancement of Science, American Geophysical Union, and the American Association of Petroleum Geologists. He also served on over a dozen earth science boards and committees and authored and contributed to numerous publications and articles on major issues involving earth resources and the environment.

Dr. Groat became the founding president and CEO of the Water Institute of the Gulf formed in 2011. “There is no better laboratory in the world than what we have right here,” says Charles “Chip” Groat, “We see this as an opportunity to form new engineering and science capabilities and advance the work in the field. It’s good for the state, and it’s good for science.”

=== Fracturing study and controversy ===
Groat led a study at the University of Texas Energy Institute, presented at a February 2012 meeting of the American Association for the Advancement of Science, that "found no evidence that hydraulic fracturing... had contaminated shallow groundwater." The study narrowly defined hydraulic fracturing as only referring to the injection of fluid under pressure to create pathways. The definition excluded the impact of equipment failure, the nature of the fluids themselves, the preparations prior to injection, spills, and events following the injection, such as movement of the fluid through soil and faults, and impact of flowback and wastewater, which the study found to be likely sources of contamination.

In July 2012, the objectivity of the study was called into question by the Public Accountability Initiative after they discovered that Groat received compensation as a director of Plains Exploration & Production, an oil and gas producing company, and that he held 40,000 shares of their stock. The Initiative director characterized Groat as a "gas industry insider." In response, Groat stated, "The results were determined by the individual investigators, not me and I did not alter their conclusions." Officials at the University of Texas were previously unaware of his compensation by Plains and commissioned an outside review of the study. Professor Groat retired from the University of Texas of Austin effective November 30, 2012. On December 6, 2012, the University of Texas posted a statement on its website www.utexas.edu stating that an independent review of the circumstances surrounding the fracking study had found weaknesses in the university's ethics regulations. The university accepted the reviewers' findings and promised an overhaul of its conflict-of-interest policies. The statement also announced Groat's departure from the University of Texas and the immediate resignation of Raymond L. Orbach from his post as Director of the Energy Institute. The Plains Exploration & Production board dissolved in 2013 when the company merged with Freeport-McMoRan Copper and Gold Inc.

== Personal life and death ==
Groat was an avid runner, sailboat racer, and world traveler. He died in Baton Rouge, Louisiana, on March 14, 2025, at age 84. He was survived by his wife of 61 years, Barbara F. “Bobbie” Groat, and two children.

Government offices
Preceded by Gordon P. Eaton	13th Director of the United States Geological Survey; 1998–2005	Succeeded by Mark Myers
