= Louisiana Museum =

Louisiana Museum may refer to:

- Louisiana Museum of Modern Art, Humlebæk, Denmark
- Louisiana Museum of Natural History, Baton Rouge, Louisiana, US
- Louisiana State Museum, New Orleans, Louisiana, US
