= Vincent Ellis McKelvey =

American geologist (1916–1987)

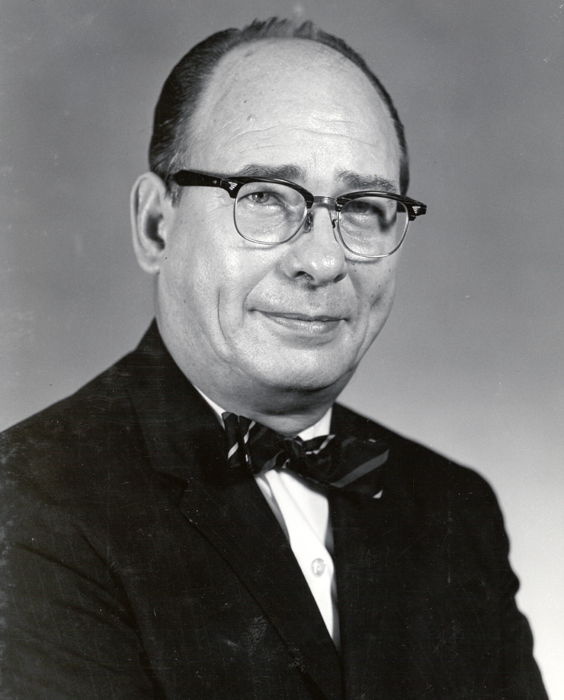
- McKelvey as Director of USGS, 1971

9th Director of the United States Geological Survey
- In office 1971 – 1978
- Preceded by: William Thomas Pecora
- Succeeded by: Henry William Menard

Personal details
- Born: April 6, 1916 Huntingdon, Pennsylvania, US
- Died: January 23, 1987 (aged 70) St. Cloud, Florida, US
- Scientific career
- Education: Syracuse University; University of Wisconsin
- Known for: McKelvey diagram
- Fields: Geology
- Workplaces: U.S. Geological Survey
- Thesis: Stratigraphy of the phosphatic shale member of the Phosphoria formation in western Wyoming, southeastern Idaho, and northern Utah (1947)

Vincent Ellis McKelvey (April 6, 1916 – January 23, 1987) was an American geologist and earth scientist. Recognized as an international authority on deep-sea mineral deposits, he spent 46 years with the United States Geological Survey. From 1968 to 1982, he served as scientific adviser and senior deputy to the United States delegation to the Law of the Sea Conference of the United Nations, where fellow delegates often depended on his ability to render complex scientific issues into plain English.

He joined the US Geological Survey, a branch of the Department of the Interior, in 1941. He was placed in charge of its explorations for uranium after World War II, was assistant chief geologist for economic and foreign geology by 1962 and was named senior research geologist three years later. McKelvey was named chief geologist of the Geological Survey in 1971 shortly before he became its ninth director, a post he held through 1977.

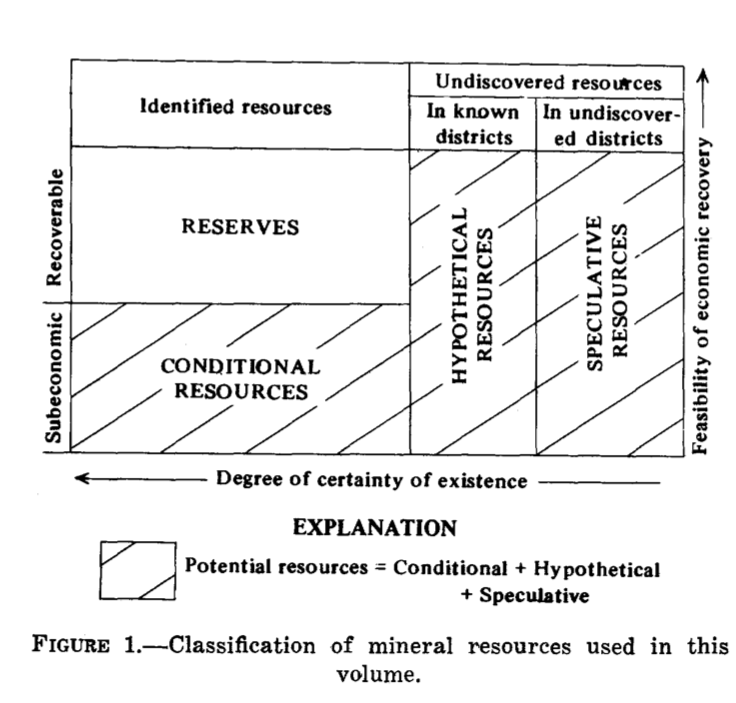
McKelvey Diagram, 1973

The McKelvey diagram (or box), a visual representation of how to classify a particular mineral resource based on the value of its production (economic, marginal, etc.) and the geologic certainty of its presence (measured, inferred, hypothetical, etc.), is named after him.

== United States Geological Survey career ==
In 1971, after William Thomas Pecora became Under Secretary of the Interior, Chief Geologist Vincent E. McKelvey, a career scientist with the Survey since 1941, became Director. McKelvey, a graduate of Syracuse University with a master and doctorate degrees from the University of Wisconsin, had served in several research and administrative capacities in the Geological Survey. He was internationally known for his studies of phosphates, had headed the Survey's program of exploration and research for the Atomic Energy Commission for several years, had been deeply involved in sometimes controversial estimates of long-range energy and mineral-resource needs, and had most recently been engaged in studies of seabed resources.

McKelvey's term as Director was marked by an increase in multidisciplinary studies and in the diversity and complexity of Geological Survey operations, as well as an increased effort to make scientific information acquired through years of research available in a form most easily used in the solution of such contemporary problems. In 1973, the Geological Survey moved its National Headquarters from downtown Washington, D.C. to a new building designed expressly for its needs in Reston, Virginia. It took on primary responsibility for operational research in seismology and geomagnetism by agreement with the National Oceanic and Atmospheric Administration, and 10 units of NOAA were transferred to the Geological Survey.

In 1976, Congress transferred jurisdiction of the Petroleum Reserve in Alaska from the Department of the Navy to the Department of the Interior, effective June 1, 1977. Responsibility for administration of the continuing petroleum exploration program on the Reserve and operation of the South Barrow Gas Field was delegated to the Director of the Survey. The new activity brought with it a 50-percent increase in funds, but most of the increase was for contractual services.

=== Forced resignation ===
McKelvey was a cornucopian who believed that availability of natural resources such as oil and gas was limited mainly by the technology used to extract them. But with the election of Jimmy Carter in 1976, McKelvey found his views out of favor with the administration.

In September 1977, the Assistant Secretary of the Interior Joan Davenport called on McKelvey and asked for his resignation. McKelvey said that he resigned for the good of the USGS, and told reporters that he had been told that secretary Cecil Andrus wanted to have his own team.

This was the only instance in the history of the USGS that a director was removed because of differences with the presidential administration. Some USGS employees worried that the Survey's science would become politicized. Newspaper editorials in the Wall Street Journal and other papers defended McKelvey as an outstanding scientist, and criticized the Carter administration's unprecedented removal of McKelvey as a blow to the scientific independence of the USGS.

From 1978 until his death at his home in St. Cloud, Florida, McKelvey continued to work as senior research geologist for the Geological Survey and also taught at the Florida Institute of Technology during the early 1980s.

== Personal life ==
McKelvey was married to Genevieve Bowman McKelvey. They had one son, Gregory McKelvey.

== Awards and honors ==
- 1963 – Distinguished Service Award, Department of the Interior
- 1972 – Career Service Award from the National Civil Service League
- 1973 – Rockefeller Public Service Award
- 1975 – Honorary Degree – Syracuse University
- 1977 – Special Award for Meritorious Service from the American Association of Petroleum Geologists
- 1977 – Distinguished Public Service Award from the Rocky Mountain Association of Geologists
- 1978 – 6,680-foot-high peak in the Thiel Mountains of Antarctica was named for him by the Interior Department's Board on Geographic names
- 1979 – Human Needs Award from the American Association of Petroleum Geologists
- Honorary Degree – South Dakota School of Mines and Technology
- There is an annual scientific symposium in his honor, the V.E. McKelvey Forum on Mineral and Energy Resources
- A building on the Menlo Park, California campus of the USGS is named in his honor
- The mineral species mckelveyite-(Y) (originally named simply mckelveyite) is named in his honor and for his studies of the Phosphoria Formation of Wyoming and Idaho.

== Publications ==
- "Subsea mineral resources" US Geological Survey bulletin No. 1689-A (1986)
- McKelvey, V. E. and Nancy A. Wright and Roger W. Bowen, "Analysis of the world distribution of metal-rich subsea manganese nodules" US Geological Survey Circular No. 886, 1983.
- "Investigations needed to stimulate the development of Jordan's mineral resources" US Geological Survey Open-file Report No. 79-1569. 1979
- "The collected speeches of Dr. V. E. McKelvey, Director, U.S. Geological Survey, 1971–1977" US Geological Survey, 1978
- "The oceans : the national and international policy frontier" Woods Hole Oceanographic Institution, 1976.
- "Subsea mineral resources and problems related to their development" US Geological Survey Circular No. 619, 1969.
- "Search for uranium in the United States" US Geological Survey and the US Atomic Energy Commission. Trace elements investigations report No. 476, 1954
- "Search for uranium in the United States" US Geological Survey bulletin No. 1030-A, 1955
- "Search for uranium in western United States" US Geological Survey and the US Atomic Energy Commission. Trace elements investigations report No. 199, 1953

Government offices
Preceded by William Thomas Pecora	Director of the United States Geological Survey; 1971–1978	Succeeded by Henry William Menard
