= Marcia McNutt =

American geophysicist

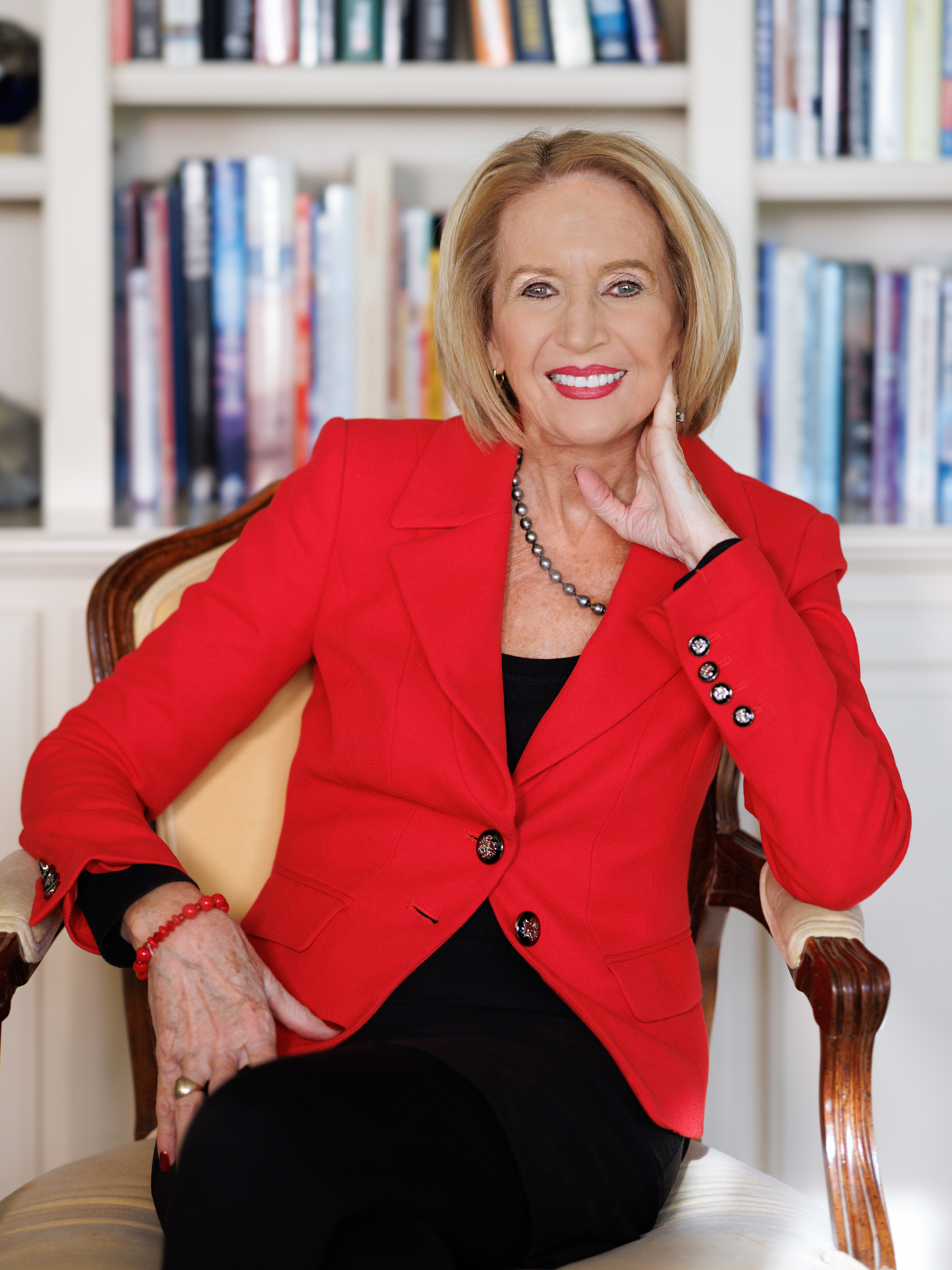
- McNutt in 2023

22nd President of the National Academy of Sciences
- Incumbent
- Assumed office July 1, 2016
- Preceded by: Ralph J. Cicerone

15th Director of the United States Geological Survey
- In office 2010–2013
- President: Barack Obama
- Preceded by: Mark D. Myers
- Succeeded by: Suzette Kimball

Personal details
- Born: Marcia Kemper McNutt; February 19, 1952 (age 74) Minneapolis, Minnesota, U.S.
- Education: Colorado College (BA); Scripps Institution of Oceanography (MS, PhD)
- Scientific career
- Workplaces: National Academy of Sciences; United States Geological Survey; Monterey Bay Aquarium Research Institute; Stanford University; University of California, Santa Cruz; Massachusetts Institute of Technology; Scripps Institution of Oceanography
- Thesis: Continental and Oceanic Isostasy (1978)
- Doctoral advisor: Henry William Menard

Marcia Kemper McNutt (born February 19, 1952) is an American geophysicist and the 22nd president of the National Academy of Sciences (NAS) of the United States.

McNutt was the 15th director of the United States Geological Survey (USGS) (the first woman to hold the post) as well as science adviser to the United States secretary of the interior from 2010 to 2013. Before working for USGS, McNutt was president and chief executive officer of the Monterey Bay Aquarium Research Institute (MBARI), an oceanographic research center in the United States, professor of marine geophysics at Stanford University's School of Earth Sciences, at the University of California, Santa Cruz, and professor of geophysics at the Massachusetts Institute of Technology.

She served as editor-in-chief of the peer-reviewed journal Science from 2013 to 2016 and holds a visiting appointment at the Scripps Institution of Oceanography. She is a member of the National Academies of Sciences, Engineering, and Medicine advisory committee for the Division on Earth and Life Studies and the Forum on Open Science.

McNutt chaired the NASEM climate intervention committee, which delivered two reports in 2015.

== Family and education ==
McNutt was valedictorian of her class at the Northrop Collegiate School (now The Blake School) in Minneapolis, graduating in 1970. She received a bachelor's degree in physics, graduating summa cum laude and Phi Beta Kappa, from Colorado College in 1973. As a National Science Foundation Graduate Fellow, she then studied geophysics at the Scripps Institution of Oceanography, where she earned a PhD in earth sciences in 1978. Her dissertation was titled Continental and Oceanic Isostasy.

After holding a brief appointment at the University of Minnesota, McNutt worked for three years on earthquake prediction at the USGS in Menlo Park, California. In 1982, she became an assistant professor at the Massachusetts Institute of Technology (MIT) and in 1988 was appointed Griswold Professor of Geophysics. She previously served as director of the Joint Program in Oceanography and Applied Ocean Science and Engineering, a cooperative effort of MIT and the Woods Hole Oceanographic Institution.

McNutt is a National Association of Underwater Instructors (NAUI)-certified scuba diver and received training in underwater demolition and explosives handling through programs run by the United States Navy’s Underwater Demolition Team (UDT) and Navy SEALs.

Marcia Kemper McNutt's first husband Marcel Hoffmann Jr. died in 1988. They had three daughters: Meredith McNutt Hoffmann, and identical twins, Dana and Ashley Hoffmann. Ashley Hoffmann was "Miss Rodeo California" in 2009. Marcia McNutt is also a horse enthusiast and enjoys barrel racing on her mare Lulu.

McNutt is one of six women scientists featured in the 1995 PBS (WGBH-TV) series, "Discovering Women." How she excelled in science with a household of young daughters and the help she received from her housekeeper, Ann, and Ann's daughter, is described by Jocelyn Steinke in "A portrait of a woman as a scientist: breaking down barriers created by gender-role stereotypes".

In 1994, McNutt was one of 16 women faculty in the School of Science at MIT who drafted and co-signed a letter to then-Dean of Science Robert Birgeneau (later Chancellor of UC Berkeley), launching a campaign to highlight and challenge gender discrimination at MIT.

McNutt and Ian Young, an MBARI ship's captain, were married in 1996.

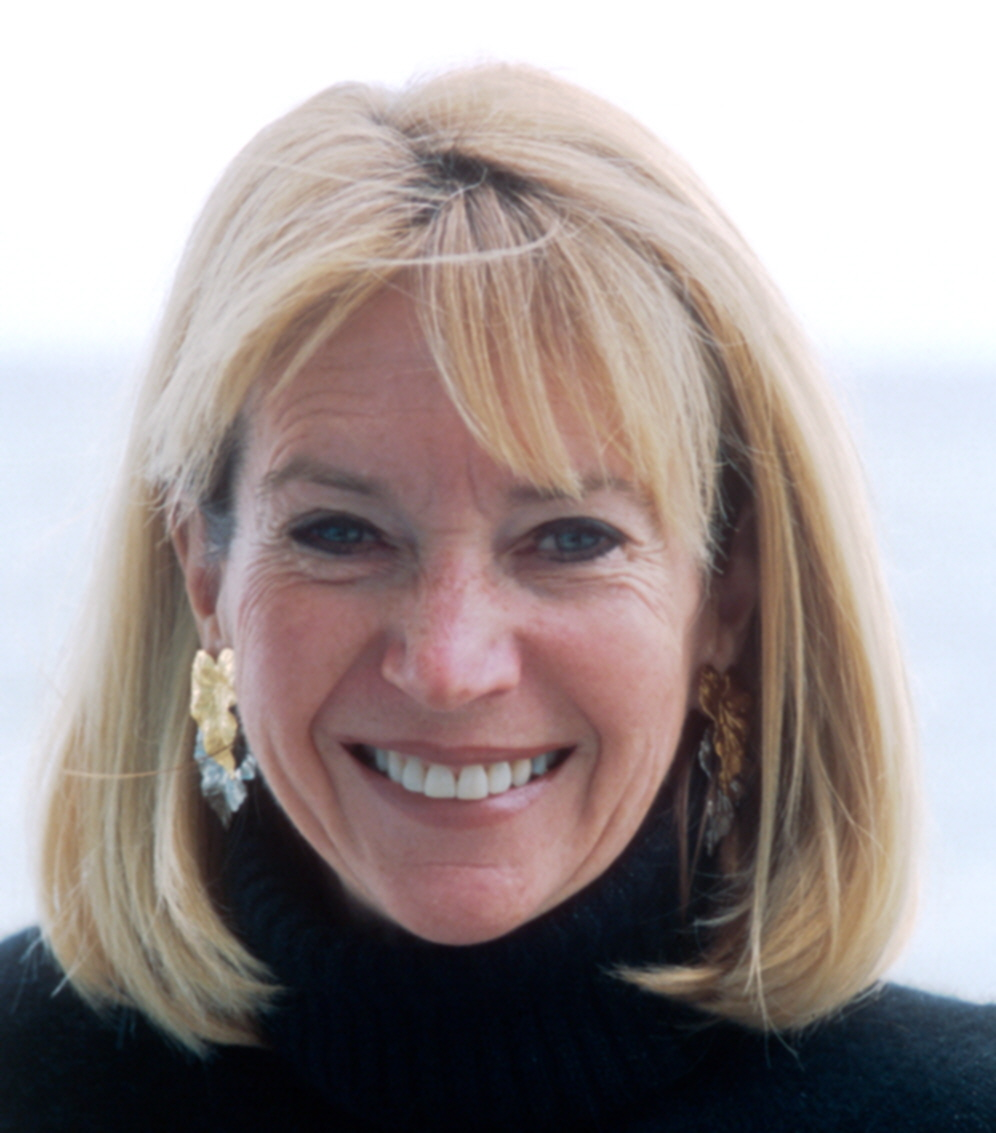
Marcia McNutt in 2007

== Research ==
She participated in 15 major oceanographic expeditions and served as chief scientist on more than half of them. She has published about 100 peer-reviewed scientific articles. Her research has included studies of ocean island volcanism in French Polynesia, continental breakup in the Western United States, and uplift of the Tibet plateau.

McNutt has made notable contributions to the understanding of the rheology and strength of the lithosphere. Her work demonstrated that young volcanoes could flex the lithosphere, influencing the elevation of nearby volcanoes, and used a 3-D analysis of topography and gravity data to show that the Australian plate behaves as strong over short time scales and weak over longer time scales. She also showed how subducting ocean plates could become mechanically weakened and identified a large topographic feature called the South Pacific superswell.

== Monterey Bay Aquarium Research Institute ==
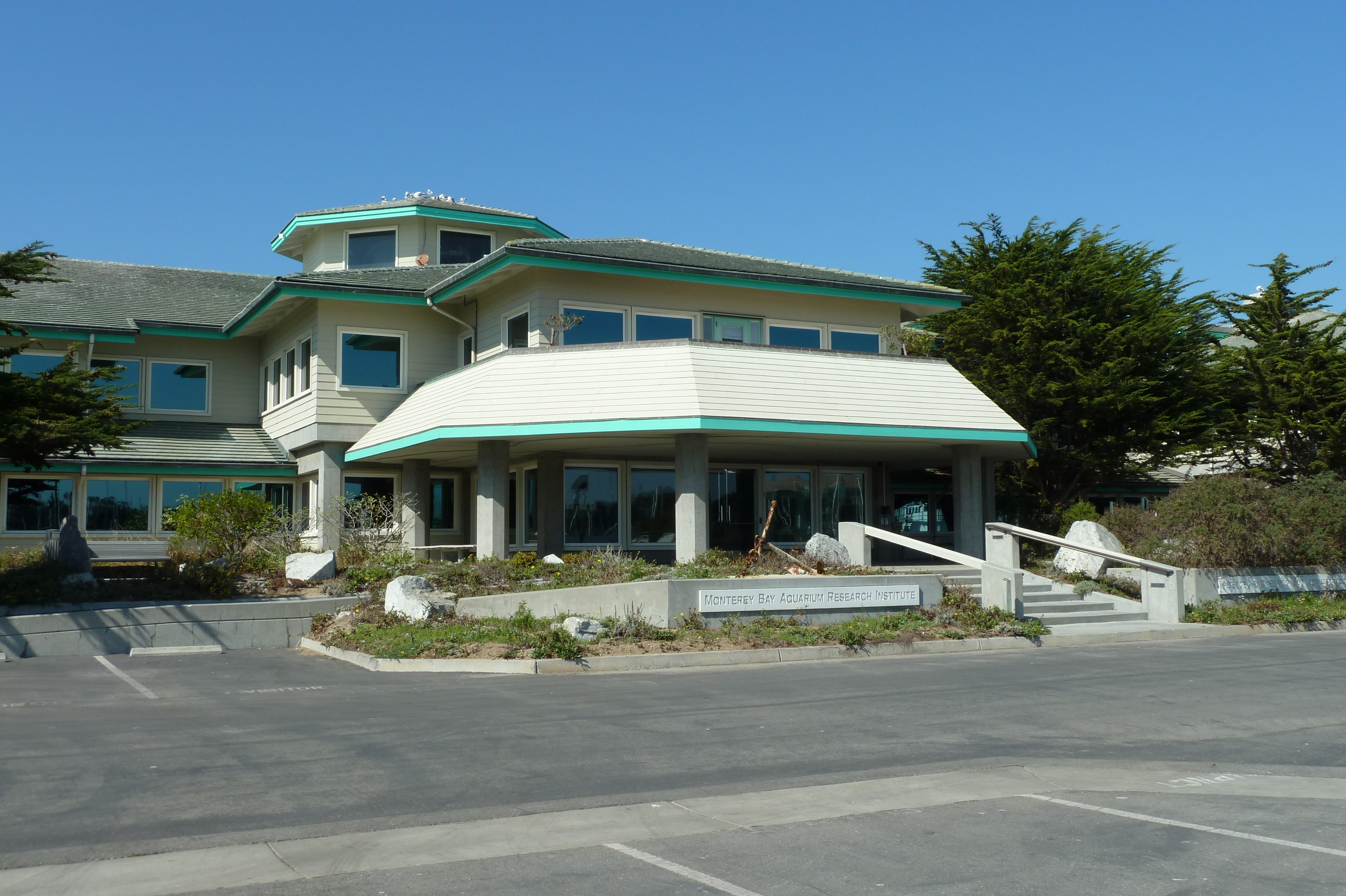
The Monterey Bay Aquarium Research Institute (MBARI) was founded and privately funded by David Packard to be the "NASA of the oceans".

McNutt was president and CEO of the Monterey Bay Aquarium Research Institute (MBARI) from 1997 to 2009. During that time the RV Western Flyer, MBARI's research vessel, made expeditions from Canada to Baja California and the Hawaiian Islands. MBARI built the Monterey Accelerated Research System (MARS), the first deep-sea cabled observatory in the continental United States.

McNutt chaired the NASEM climate intervention committee who delivered two reports in 2015.

== U.S. Geological Survey ==
=== Appointment ===
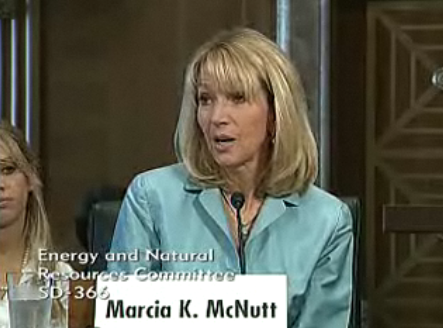
McNutt speaking during her confirmation hearing by the United States Senate Committee on Energy and Natural Resources in 2009

In July 2009, McNutt was announced as President Obama's nominee to be the next director of the United States Geological Survey and science adviser to the United States Secretary of the Interior. The Senate unanimously approved her nomination on October 21. She was the first woman to lead the USGS since its establishment in 1879. Secretary Ken Salazar endorsed McNutt for the position. In a television interview following Obama's announcement, McNutt said:

Many other countries are far ahead of the U.S., in installing wind farms, installing solar panels, moving to alternate energies, and in preparing their populations for the decision-making necessary to cope with climate change.

=== BP oil spill ===
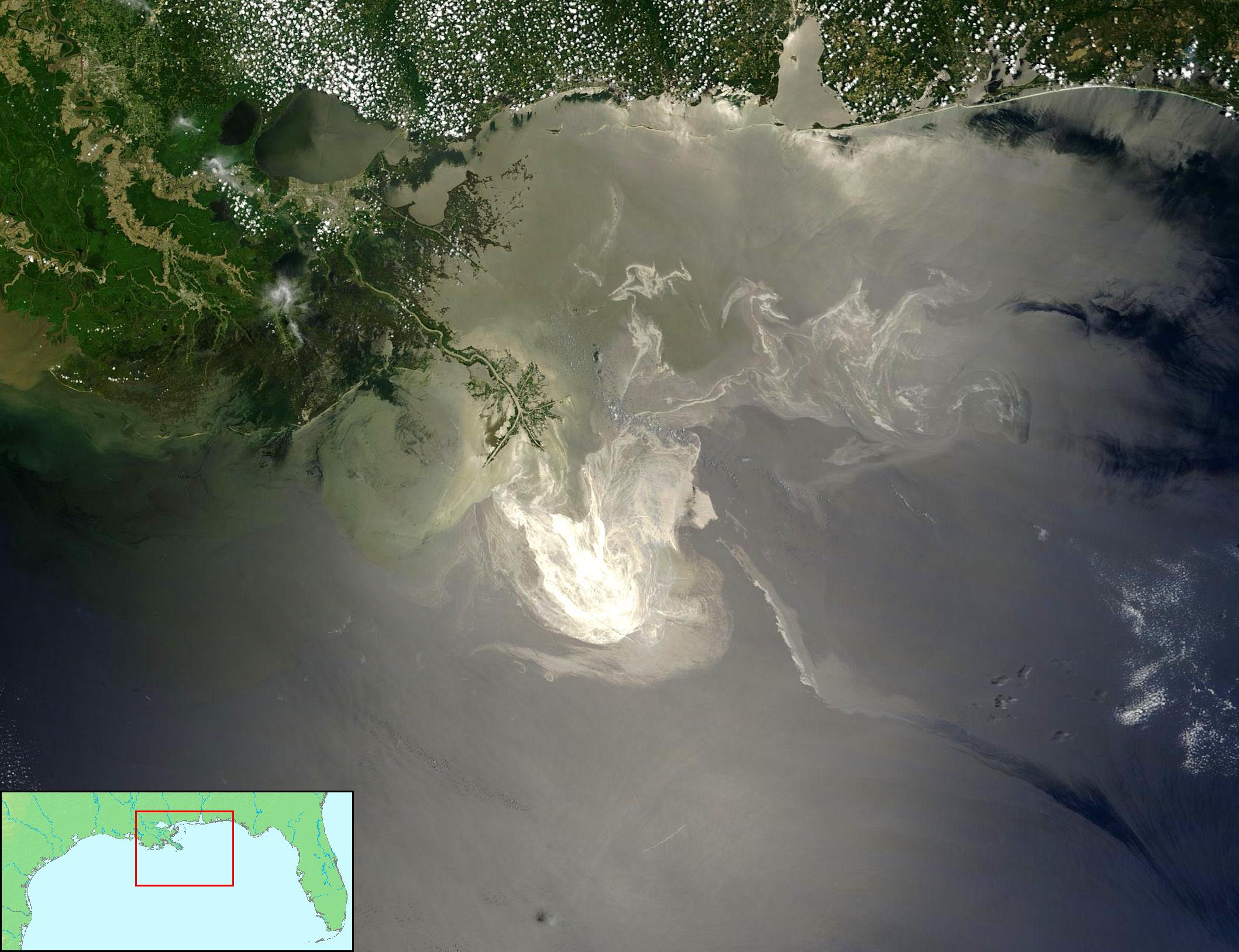
The Deepwater Horizon oil spill. McNutt headed the Flow Rate Technical Group who determined the extent of the spill.

During her first year, four major events impacted USGS in quick succession: a magnitude 7.0 earthquake in Haiti, an 8.0 earthquake in Chile, the eruption of Eyjafjallajökull and the BP oil spill.

In May 2010, McNutt headed the Flow Rate Technical Group which attempted to measure the Deepwater Horizon oil spill in the Gulf of Mexico. Preliminary reports from the group said that the rate of the oil spill was at least twice and possibly up to five times as much as previously acknowledged. Subsequent estimates, based on six independent methodologies, were four times the 1989 Exxon Valdez oil spill. A refined estimate based on new pressure readings, data, and analysis, released by the United States Secretary of Energy Steven Chu and McNutt in August, said that 4.9 million barrels (with uncertainty of plus or minus approximately 10 percent) of oil had leaked from the well until it was capped on July 15. The disaster was the largest ever accidental spill of oil into marine waters.

In a two-day deposition during October 2012, McNutt was questioned by lawyers for BP, for the Justice Department, for plaintiffs, and for the Gulf states. Subject to approval by U.S. federal courts, BP agreed to a settlement in November 2012 in which the company pleaded guilty to felony charges of misconduct or neglect concerning eleven deaths at the explosion site. The company agreed to pay US$4.5 billion including US$1.256 billion in criminal fines. As of 2012, BP may still be liable for US$5.4 to US$31 billion in civil fines under the Clean Water Act and Oil Pollution Act.

=== Public Employees for Environmental Responsibility ===
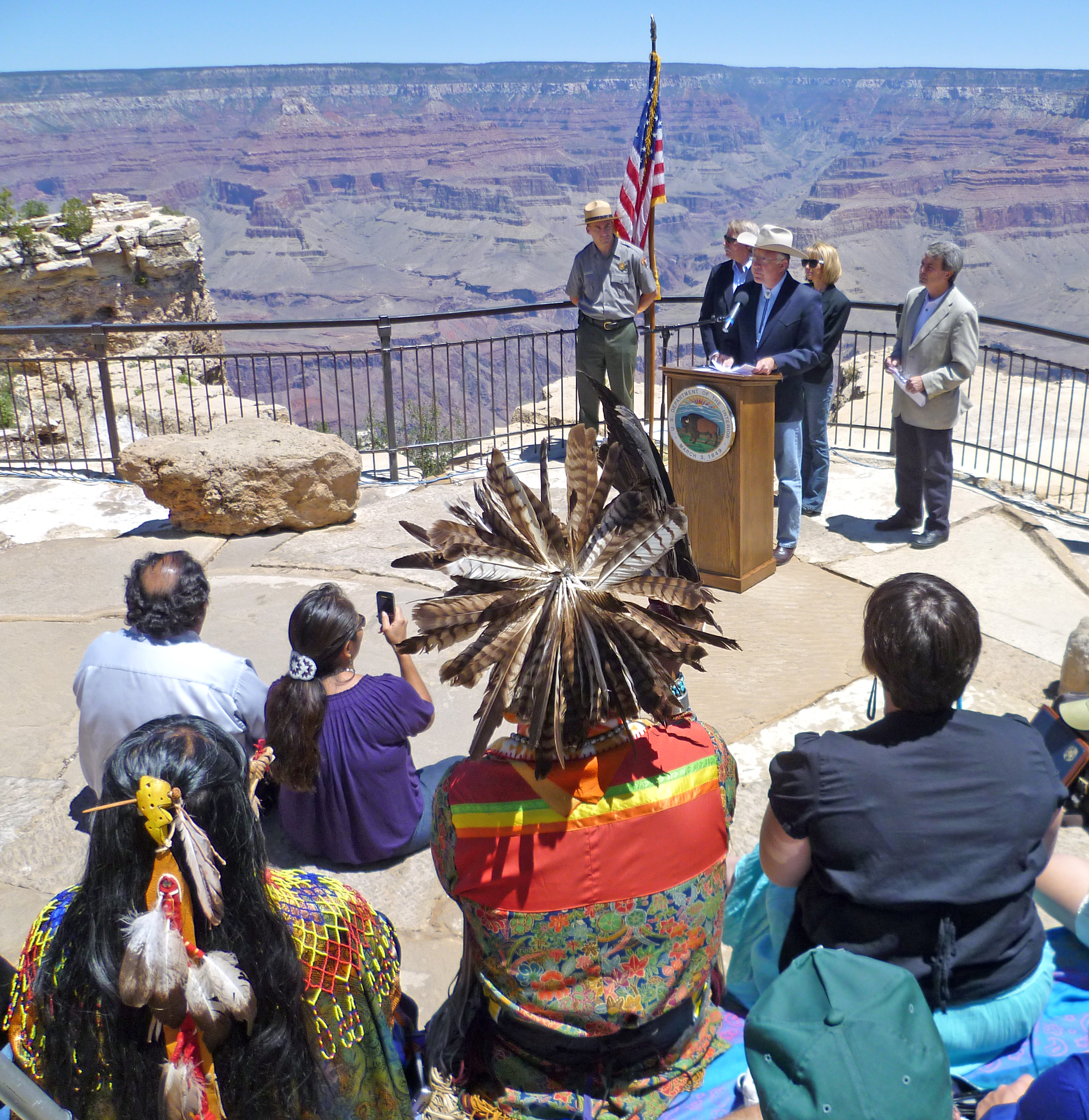
McNutt at Grand Canyon National Park with Secretary Salazar and other officials to mark an extended moratorium on uranium mining in 2011.

Public Employees for Environmental Responsibility (PEER) filed a lawsuit against the Department of the Interior and a complaint about a NOAA scientist in the Flow Rate Technical Group which McNutt led. The group felt that government scientists understated the flow rate of the Deepwater Horizon oil spill.

=== USGS peer review process ===
McNutt participated in the reversal of a 2006 USGS policy that required agency scientists to submit their work to two internal reviewers and obtain a sign-off from a higher level official before submitting their work to external journals who then applied their own peer-review process. Scientists can now have both internal and external reviews simultaneously and the internal process is reduced to one internal review plus sign-off by the USGS Office of Science Quality and Integrity.

=== Afghan mineral wealth ===
In September 2011, a USGS team including Jack H. Medlin, Said Mirzad, Stephen G. Peters and Robert D. Tucker published a report which they presented at the Afghan embassy in Washington, DC, detailing 57 information packages about Areas of Interest (AOIs) that total at least 1,000,000 metric tons of untapped mineral deposits they have found in Afghanistan. Scientific American speculated that replacing "opium and Taliban strongholds with a mining bonanza" could "change U.S. foreign policy and world stability". This report, which points to resources that The New York Times said in 2010 were worth $1 trillion, was put into the public domain. McNutt said at the time:

There is always increased risk for commercial ventures investing in new mining facilities in frontier areas such as Afghanistan, but by putting our information on the locations and estimated quantities and grades of ores in the public domain, we lower that risk, spurring progress.

=== Map of Jupiter's moon Io ===
Complete geological surface map of Io, released online in 2012

In 2011 and online in 2012, USGS released a geologic surface map of Jupiter's moon Io, which is the most volcanically active body in the Solar System, about twenty-five times more active than Earth. David Williams of Arizona State University was the project lead. The maps are made of the best images from NASA's Voyager 1 and 2 missions (acquired in 1979) as well as the spacecraft Galileo (1995–2003) named for Galileo Galilei who discovered Jupiter's moons in 1610. McNutt said:

More than 130 years after the USGS first began producing quality geologic maps here on Earth, it is exciting to have the reach of our science extend across 400 million miles to this volcanically active moon of Jupiter. Somehow it makes the vast expanse of space seem less forbidding to know that similar geologic processes which have shaped our planet are active elsewhere.

=== Animal extinction and disease ===
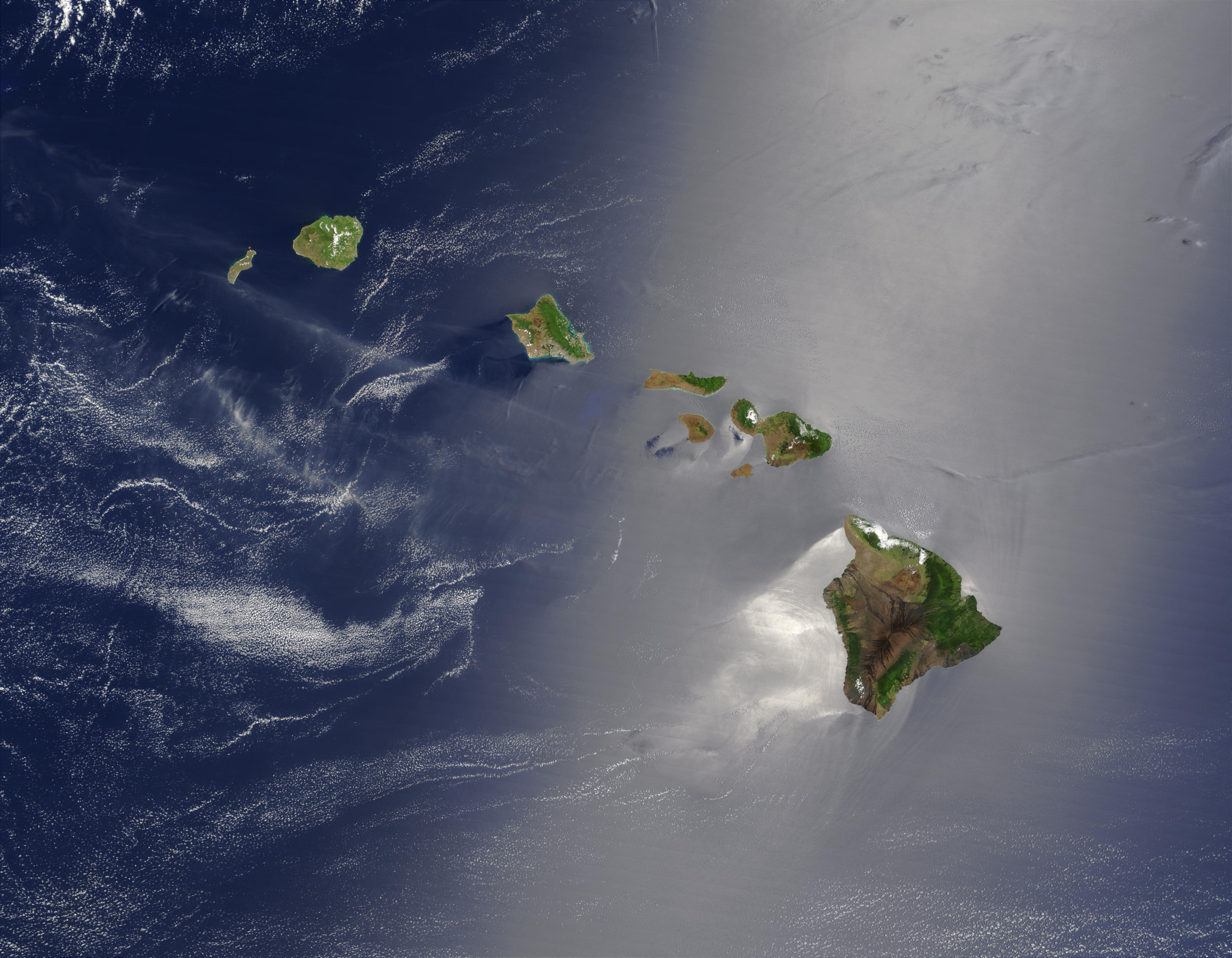
The Hawaiian Islands

In 2012, USGS declared the blue-tailed skink named Emoia impar extinct because none have been observed in their home the Hawaiian Islands since the 1960s. McNutt, quoted by John Platt for Scientific American, said:

No other landscape in these United States has been more impacted by extinction events and species invasions in historic times than the Hawaiian Islands, with as-yet unknown long-term cascading consequences to the ecosystem.

In a press release, McNutt introduced a lecture by David Blehert, a USGS research scientist, speaking on white nose syndrome which may afflict six species of North American bats and may have "far-reaching ecological consequences":

...they are in a race against time to find a way to manage this scourge before it is too late for these under-appreciated little mammals.

McNutt commented on work by lead researcher Carol Meteyer and others from the USGS National Wildlife Health Center and the National Institutes of Health in November 2012:

...The potential discovery of IRIS in bats infected with white-nose syndrome is incredibly significant in terms of understanding both the reasons for bat mortality and basic immune response. This discovery could also prove significant for studies on treatment for AIDS.

=== Federal "Big Data" initiative ===
McNutt spoke on a panel of leaders of US agencies (OSTP, NSF, NIH, DOE, DOD, DARPA and USGS) who rolled out the Obama administration's "Big Data Research and Development Initiative." Tom Kalil of the Office of Science and Technology Policy said, "By improving our ability to extract knowledge and insights from large and complex collections of digital data, the initiative promises to help accelerate the pace of discovery in science and engineering, strengthen our national security, and transform teaching and learning." USGS announced the latest awardees for grants it issues through its John Wesley Powell Center for Analysis and Synthesis.

=== Energy: fossil fuels, fracking and biofuel ===
Reuters reported that USGS released into the public domain a new estimate of the world's oil and gas resources, the first such report since 2000. Excluding the U.S. the USGS found: "565 billion barrels of conventional oil and 5,606 trillion cubic feet of undiscovered conventional natural gas in 171 priority geologic provinces of the world". The report said about 75% of the resources are in four places: South America and the Caribbean, sub-Saharan Africa, the Middle East and North Africa, and the North American Arctic. "In particular, this assessment underscores the importance of continuing to strengthen our energy partnerships in the Western Hemisphere with nations like Brazil..." said secretary Salazar.

Bloomberg News reported that during her testimony in March 2012, McNutt told the United States House Committee on Natural Resources that "less than 1 percent of wells drilled to dispose of the water after fracking causes 'induced seismicity'. McNutt said more information would reduce the risk of induced earthquakes in a year or two. She said:

It's a very solvable problem. You either have to put the holes in a different place, or pump it at a different rate.

United Press International reported in March 2012 that USGS has developed a tool that can map grasslands using remote sensing data from satellites. The technique will help if and when global demand for biofuel products increases as an alternative to fossil fuels. McNutt said in a statement that the study:

takes some of the guesswork out of deciding whether it could be feasible to raise a potentially high value crop for biofuels on America's grasslands.

=== Earthquakes: hazard reduction, drill, research ===
In cooperation with the Department of Veterans Affairs, USGS continued to monitor and record in detail the performance of veterans hospital buildings during earthquakes. Recently, two buildings were fitted with sensors at the Memphis VA Medical Center which is within the range of the New Madrid Seismic Zone, the most active earthquake zone in the Eastern United States. USGS works with the National Earthquake Hazards Reduction Program (NEHRP) led by the National Institute of Standards and Technology (NIST) both to monitor buildings during earthquake events and to help design safer hospitals in the future.

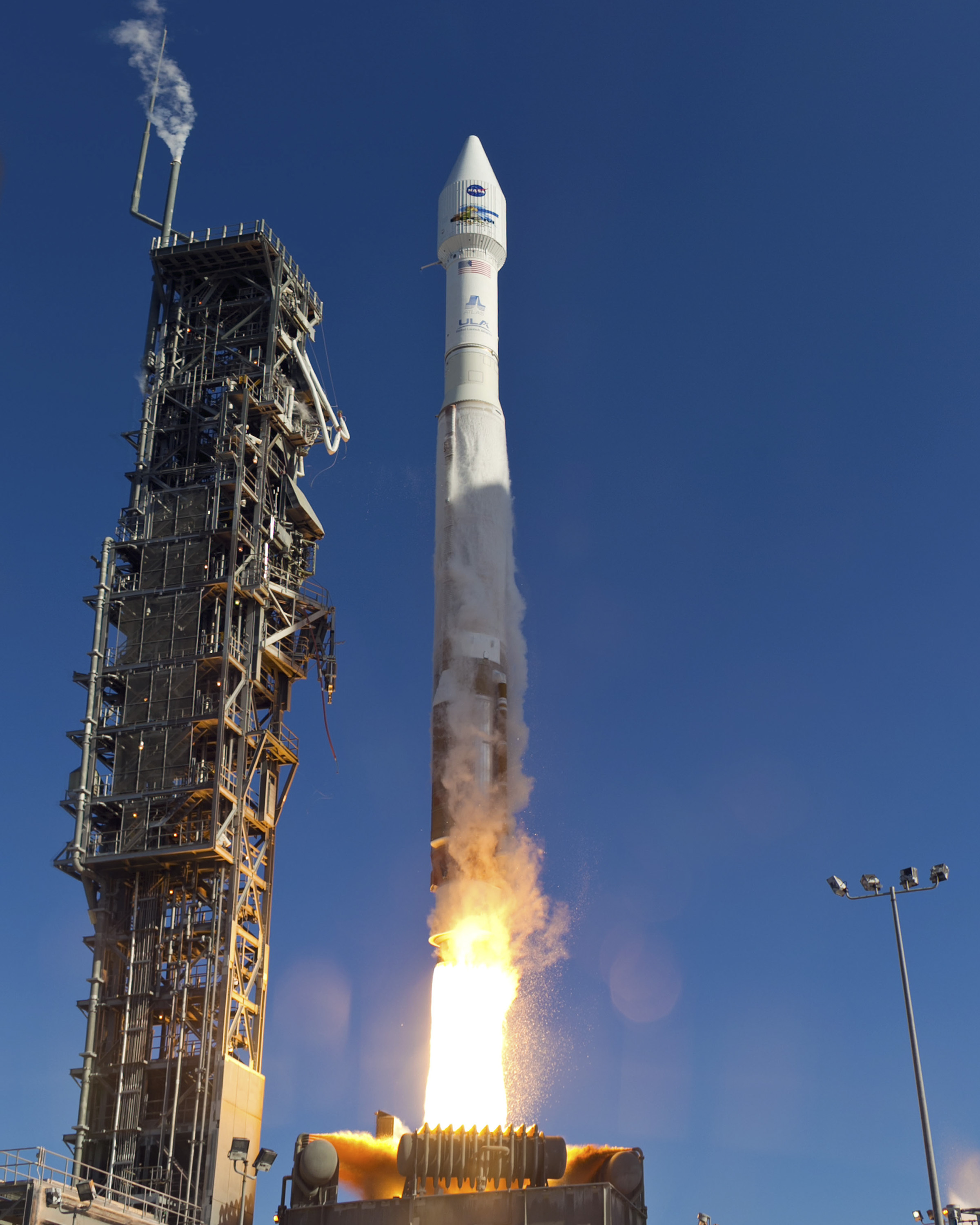
The Landsat Data Continuity Mission launch in February 2013

On October 18, 2012, McNutt, Bill Leith of USGS and Michael Mahoney of the Federal Emergency Management Agency (FEMA) continued earthquake practice at the ShakeOut at the Langston Hughes Middle School in Reston, Virginia. Participants learn to "drop, cover, and hold on" to protect themselves during an earthquake. Millions of people have participated since the event started in 2008. "Going through drills makes it second nature for the students in the event of an actual emergency," McNutt said of The Great American Shake-Out event held in February 2013 in eight US states that border on the New Madrid Seismic Zone.

USGS promised up to US$7 million in grants for earthquake research in 2013. The agency has funded about 90 such grants which, for example, cataloged southern California earthquakes to better prepare emergency responders, the public and the media. Projects also provided seismic hazard estimates for safer buildings and roads, and provided data on ground shaking to help minimize damage.

=== Landsat ===
NASA and USGS launched Landsat 8 on February 11, 2013, to continue their 40-year record of providing images for land use and climate change (about 9 million images as of 2013). McNutt wrote that Landsat 8 enhances USGS's position as land steward for the United States.

=== Departure ===
McNutt directed USGS from 2009 until 2013, when she announced her departure to USGS staff members. She said at the time that she would leave after the launch of Landsat 8 and that Suzette Kimball would serve as the acting director.

=== Exit summary ===
McNutt's announcement included a 21-point summary of her tenure which she prepared for Secretary Salazar. Among achievements listed were realignment of USGS management, eight "DOI Climate Science Centers", the "first national water census on water use and availability", a California prototype of Earthquake Early Warning, publication of the "first two of the biological carbon sequestration reports", and various means of "advancing US energy independence".

== Science tenure ==
=== Open access: Science Advances ===
As editor in chief, McNutt led the editorial team at Science in their decision to enter the world of open access publishing. Beginning in 2015, they expect to publish several thousand articles per year in the online only, open access journal Science Advances (compared to Science which can publish less than one thousand per year, accepting less than 6% of submissions). McNutt told Library Journal that they were searching for a solution to licensing, perhaps one license acceptable to all authors or perhaps offering a menu of licenses so each community can choose.

=== Keystone XL ===
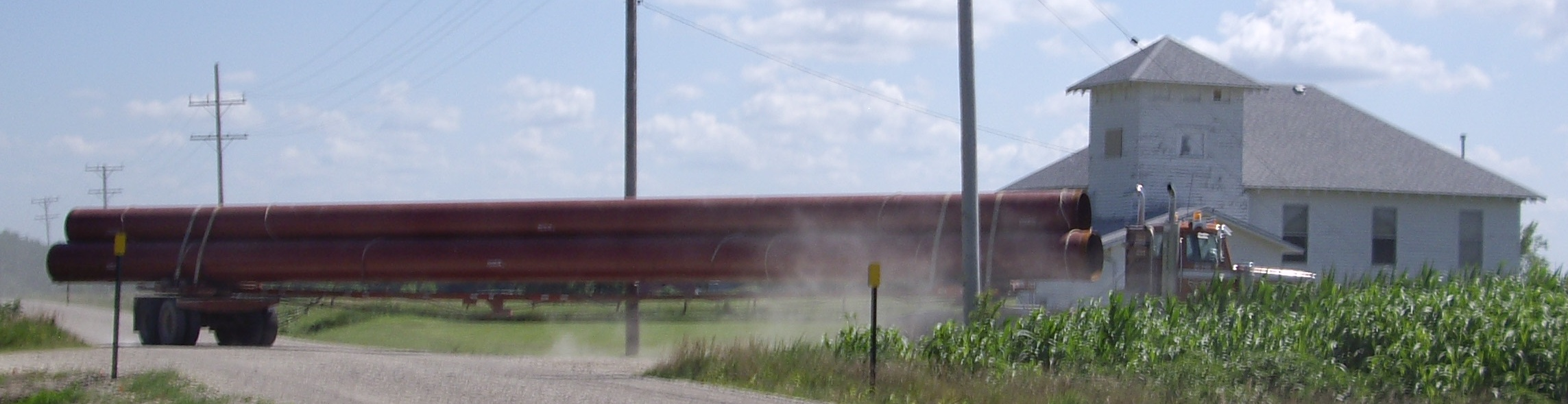
Truck hauling 36-Inch pipe to build Keystone-Cushing Pipeline (Phase 2) south-east of Peabody, Kansas, 2010

McNutt initially sided with environmentalists who opposed approval of the Keystone Pipeline. In an interview for NPR's Morning Edition in 2014, she explained why she changed her mind and published an editorial in favor. First, the oil is already being transported for example by truck and train, using more fossil fuels than the pipeline would use. Second, she thinks concessions can be made in exchange for approving the pipeline, for example requiring a limit on carbon emissions when converting the tar sands to liquid for transport in the pipeline, and demanding that the pipeline be the safest ever built. Finally, because the pipeline is the very least expensive mode of transport, she found a potential revenue stream in the money saved by the pipeline which she thinks should be used to fund renewable energy in the U.S.

=== Climate engineering ===
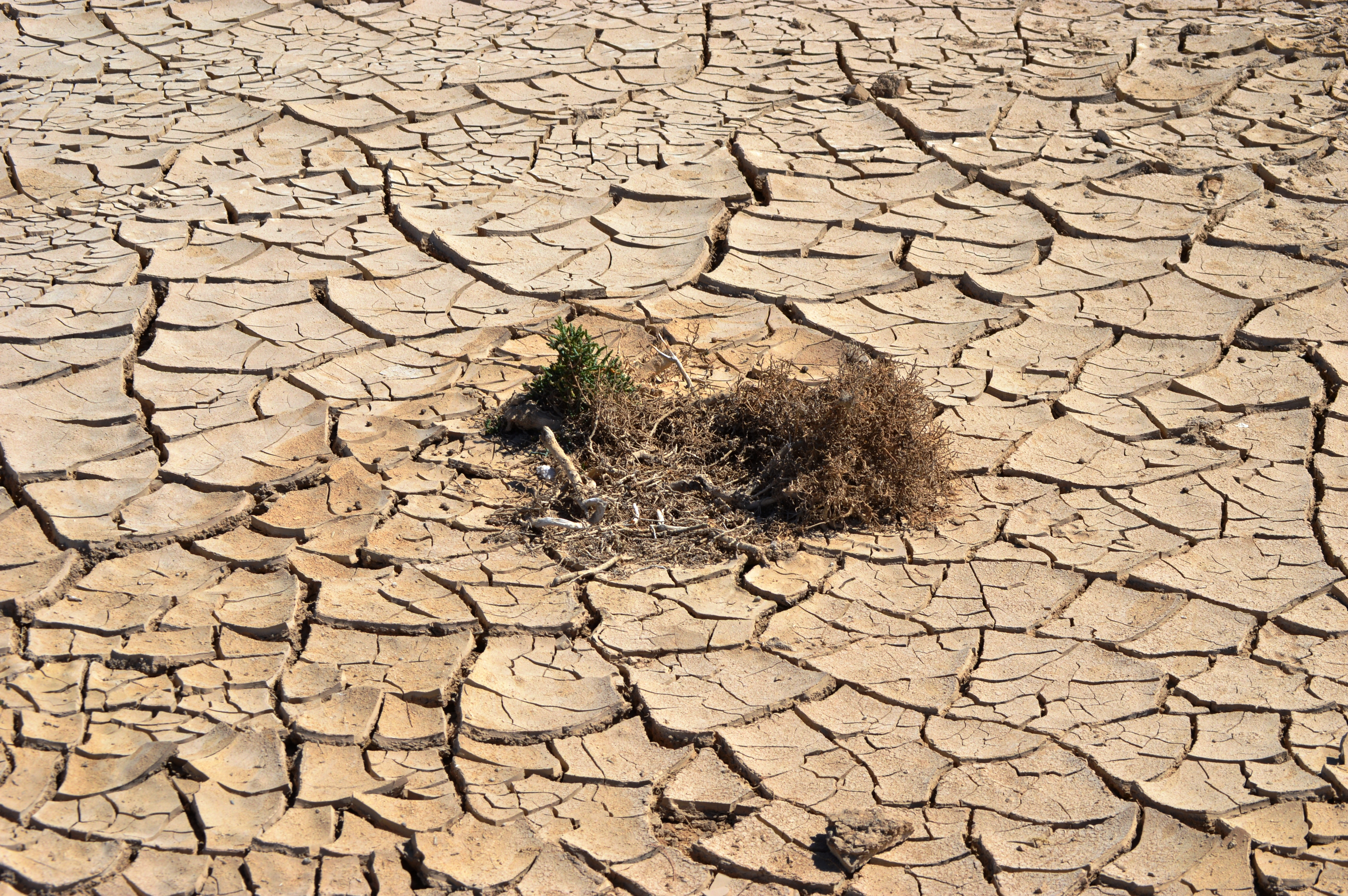
Dried Californian lake bed during drought in 2014

Several U.S. agencies including the Central Intelligence Agency requested that the U.S. government study climate engineering and so the committee that McNutt chairs was born of the National Academy of Sciences. Ken Caldeira, who also sits on the committee, and David Keith are eager to try out ideas, in part spurred by the Pacific Northwest National Laboratory funded by Bill Gates who is an enthusiast of climate engineering research. McNutt cautioned that government-sponsored field tests "may not happen".

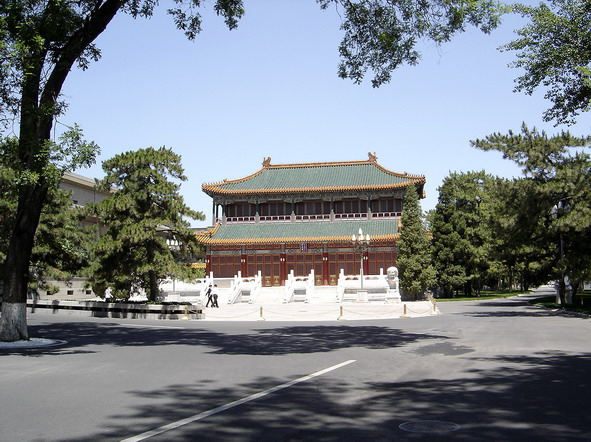
Li and McNutt met at Ziguangge (the hall of purple lights) in Zhongnanhai in 2014

Whether we wind up using these technologies, or someone else does and we suddenly find ourselves in a geo-engineered world, we have to better understand the impacts and the consequences."

=== Meeting with Li Keqiang in China ===
Premier of the People's Republic of China, Li Keqiang requested a meeting with McNutt, as editor in chief of Science, to discuss science as part of her trip to China in January 2014. The meeting was scheduled for 30 minutes and the rules specified no US reporters present and the topics of "science and the economy, not politics". They talked on 13 January at Ziguangge, Zhongnanhai in Beijing. Li answered questions from McNutt about space exploration, China's scientific cooperation with other developing countries, climate change, education, and environmental protection. Science published a transcript of the 70 minute meeting.

=== Statistical review ===
With a goal to improve the reproducibility of its published research, McNutt announced in 2014 that Science had added statistical checks to its peer-review process. Based on collaboration with the American Statistical Association, the journal appointed seven experts to a Statistics Board of Reviewing who are responsible for securing outside statisticians to review potential Science articles.

=== Cover photo and controversies ===
The cover of the 11 July 2014 issue depicted three transgender sex workers from Indonesia with their heads cropped out. Citing "she tricked me" and the "trans panic defense" sometimes used by perpetrators, The Washington Post noted that transgender people are 30 percent more likely than others to be the victims of violence. Numerous people objected in their blogs. Congresswoman Jackie Speier objected in a letter to the publisher. Science CEO and publisher Alan Leshner apologized to Speier and termed the cover "regrettable." McNutt apologized on Twitter and in Science for "any discomfort that this cover may have caused anyone" and gave her:

[P]romise that we will strive to do much better in the future to be sensitive to all groups and not assume that context and intent will speak for themselves.

The cover (and unfortunate response from the former editor of ScienceCareers) and two other columns provoked Aradhna Tripati, Jennifer Glass, Lenny Teytelman, and 600 other scientists to send a letter in 2015 to Science accusing the journal of perpetuating sexist stereotypes. In one column, Alice S. Huang, the former president of Science's publisher, the American Association for the Advancement of Science, advised a female postdoctoral fellow not to complain about her supervisor, whose habit was trying to look down the woman's shirt, as long as the supervisor didn't develop other advances. In another, the chief biochemist at Toronto's University Health Network said he was promoted because his wife had given up her career and PhD to support him. McNutt published a formal apology in July 2015, and said that she thought Science should start an advisory board made up of young scientists who might be in tune with the issues.

=== Support for science ===
In June 2014, the US National Institutes of Health (NIH) together with Nature Publishing Group and Science held a workshop on the reproducibility and rigor of research findings. More than 30 participants, who all publish preclinical biological research, codified a set of principles that will advance and support research that is reproducible, robust, and transparent. The principles are endorsed by 78 associations, journals and societies who all agreed to them.

In January 2015, the Pew Research Center published a poll representing the public and a sample of scientists connected to the American Association for the Advancement of Science (AAAS). The public and scientists disagreed quite dramatically on 12 out of 13 issues covered in the survey. On the occasion of Pew's publication, writer Joel Achenbach asked McNutt for her input on a National Geographic feature article, "Why Do Many Reasonable People Doubt Science?". McNutt neatly gave this definition:

Science is not a body of facts. Science is a method for deciding whether what we choose to believe has a basis in the laws of nature or not.

=== Retraction ===
In May 2015, McNutt and Science retracted a December 2014 study, "When contact changes minds: An experiment on transmission of support for gay equality." Donald Green requested the retraction after asking for and not receiving the study data from his coauthor Michael LaCour.

=== Family of journals expands ===
In 2015, Science announced the expansion of its family of journals to include Science Robotics and Science Immunology. Both were expected to begin publication in mid-2016. The first issue of Science Immunology was published in July 2016, while the first issue of Science Robotics was published in December 2016.

== National Academy of Sciences ==
In July 2015, McNutt was nominated to stand for election as president of the National Academy of Sciences. She was elected to a six-year term beginning July 1, 2016 and ending June 30, 2022.

=== Climate intervention ===
McNutt chaired the National Academy of Sciences Committee on Geoengineering Climate: Technical Evaluation and Discussion of Impacts, whose sixteen scientists published their findings on climate geoengineering in February 2015. The committee decided to issue two complementary reports, one on mitigating carbon dioxide emissions, and one on albedo modification. They agreed to call the process "intervention", which implies an action intended to improve, rather than "management" or "geoengineering" which imply control that people don't have. Of the reports' six recommendations, the first is that right now we can and should work toward mitigation of greenhouse gas emissions and on adapting to the impacts of climate change.

This work was supported by the U.S. intelligence community, the National Aeronautics and Space Administration (NASA), the National Oceanic and Atmospheric Administration (NOAA), the United States Department of Energy (DOE), and the National Academy of Sciences. At the press briefing on the release of the reports, McNutt expressed preference for the first report over the second: mitigation and adaptation are the way forward (explaining that albedo modification carries unknown environmental and governance risks).

== Workshop with Pope Francis ==
In May 2014, McNutt and a group of international scholars and scientists participated in a workshop with Pope Francis organized by the Pontifical Academy of Sciences and the Pontifical Academy of Social Sciences. By invitation, McNutt presented a paper, "The Risks of Rising Seas to Coastal Populations." In a September editorial in Science, McNutt discussed "future habitability and sustainability of this planet" and advocated for United Nations Sustainable Development Goals which the group wished to adopt. She was a signatory of the workshop report. In advance of the Laudato si' papal encyclical of May–June 2015, the leadership council of the Sustainable Development Solutions Network, of which McNutt is a member, released eight criteria for climate change mitigation, which they hoped would be addressed by the 2015 United Nations Climate Change Conference.

== Awards and honors ==
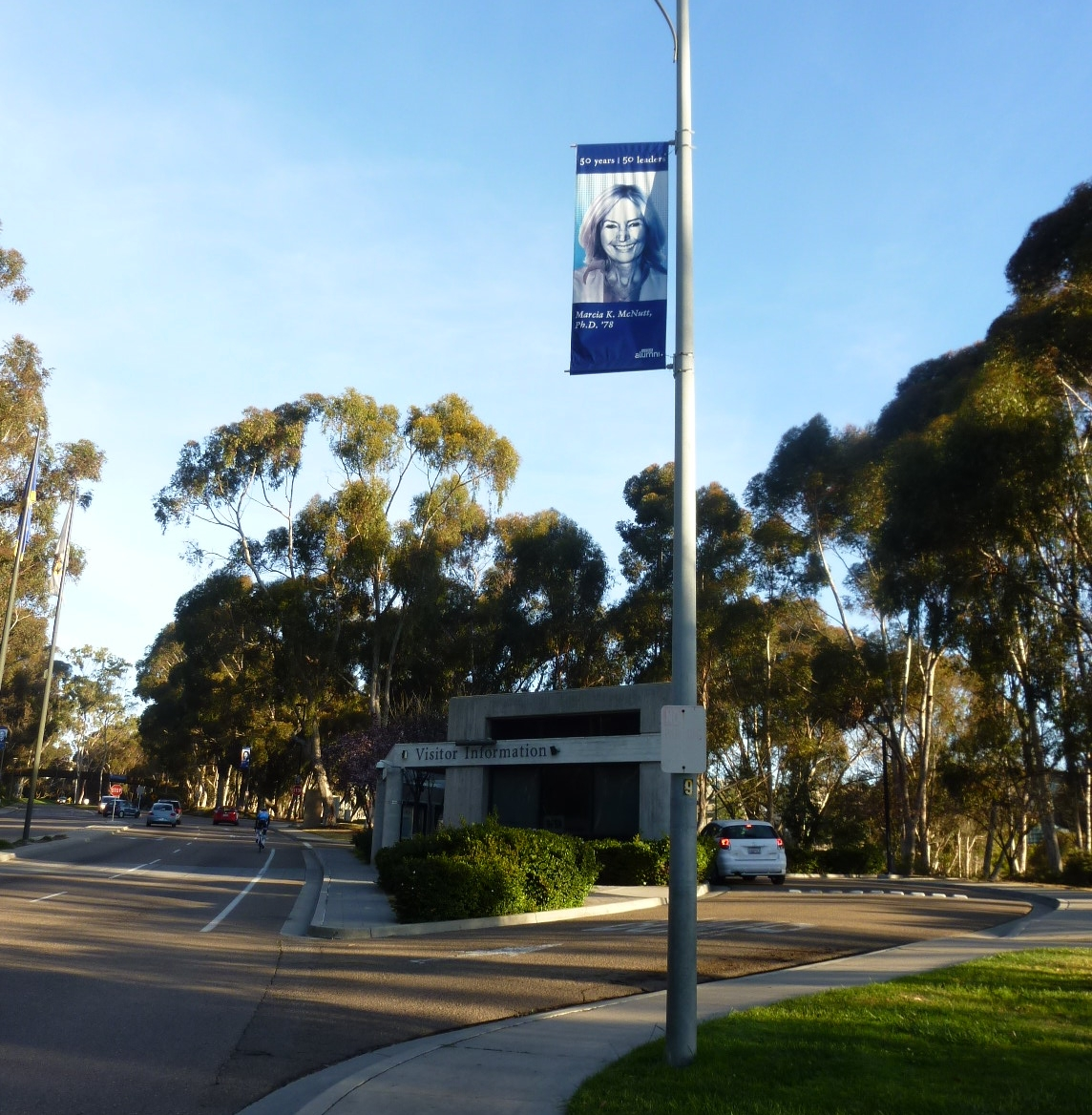
A photo of McNutt (shown at the school's Gilman Entrance) was part of the University of California, San Diego celebration of 50 Years 50 Leaders (2012).

McNutt was elected a Foreign member of the Royal Society, and a member of the National Academy of Sciences, the American Philosophical Society, and the American Academy of Arts and Sciences. She is a fellow for the American Geophysical Union, the Geological Society of America, the American Association for the Advancement of Science and the International Association of Geodesy. She is a past president of the American Geophysical Union (2000–2002) and the National Academy of Sciences (2016–2022).

She holds honorary doctorates from Indiana University (2021), Boston University (2019), Worcester Polytechnic Institute (2018), Michigan State University (2018), Colorado School of Mines (2011) Monmouth University (2010), the University of Minnesota (2004), and Colorado College (1989). McNutt was also recognized as an Outstanding Alumni in 2004 by the University of California, San Diego.

She chaired the President's Panel on Ocean Exploration under President Bill Clinton. McNutt chaired the board of governors of the Joint Oceanographic Institutions which merged to become Consortium for Ocean Leadership for which she was trustee. She serves on evaluation and advisory boards for institutions including the Monterey Bay Aquarium, Stanford University, Harvard University and Science magazine, and the Journal of Science Policy and Governance.

In 1988, McNutt won the Macelwane Medal from the American Geophysical Union, presented for outstanding research by a young scientist, and in 2007 she won the AGU's Maurice Ewing Medal for her contributions to deep-sea exploration and her leadership role in the ocean sciences. In 2002, Discover magazine named McNutt one of the top fifty women in science. In 2003 she was named Scientist of the Year by the ARCS Foundation. The United States Coast Guard awarded the Meritorious Service Medal to McNutt for her service during the Deepwater Horizon oil spill. McNutt is a member of the 2012 USA Science & Engineering Festival's Nifty Fifty, a collection of the most influential scientists and engineers in the United States that are dedicated to reinvigorating the interest of young people in science and engineering. McNutt won the 2017 DRI Nevada Medal. In 2021, was elected as a member of the National Academy of Engineering "for elucidation of lithosphere geomechanics and leadership in earth resources engineering".

== Selected publications ==
- McNutt, Marcia; Menard, H. W. (1978). "Lithospheric flexure and uplifted atolls". Journal of Geophysical Research. 83 (B3): 1206–1212. Bibcode:1978JGR....83.1206M. doi:10.1029/JB083iB03p01206.
- — (1979). "Compensation of ocean topography – Application of the response function technique to the Surveyor area". Journal of Geophysical Research. 84 (NB13): 7589–7598. Bibcode:1979JGR....84.7589M. doi:10.1029/jb084ib13p07589.
- —; Menard, H. W. (1982). "Constraints on yield strength in the oceanic lithosphere derived from observations of flexure". Geophysical Journal International. 71 (2): 363–394. Bibcode:1982GeoJ...71..363M. doi:10.1111/j.1365-246X.1982.tb05994.x. S2CID 129569745.
- — (1984). "Lithospheric flexure and thermal anomalies". Journal of Geophysical Research. 89 (B13): 11180–11194. Bibcode:1984JGR....8911180M. doi:10.1029/JB089iB13p11180.
- McNutt, Marcia K.; Fischer, Karen M. (1987). "The South Pacific Superswell". In Keating, Barbara H. (ed.). Seamounts, Islands, and Atolls. Geophysical Monograph Series. Vol. 43. p. 25. Bibcode:1987GMS....43...25M. doi:10.1029/gm043p0025. ISBN 978-0-87590-068-1.
- —; Diament, M.; Kogan, M. G. (1988). "Variations of elastic plate thickness at continental thrust belts". Journal of Geophysical Research. 93 (B8): 8825–8838. Bibcode:1988JGR....93.8825M. doi:10.1029/JB093iB08p08825.
- —; Judge, A. V. (1990). "The Superswell and Mantle Dynamics Beneath the South Pacific". Science. 248 (4958): 969–975. Bibcode:1990Sci...248..969M. doi:10.1126/science.248.4958.969. PMID 17745401. S2CID 39022964.
- Kruse, Sarah; McNutt, Marcia; Phipps-Morgan, Jason; Royden, Leigh; Wernicke, Brian (1991). "Lithospheric extension near Lake Mead, Nevada: A model for ductile flow in the lower crust" (PDF). Journal of Geophysical Research. 96 (B3): 4435–4456. Bibcode:1991JGR....96.4435K. doi:10.1029/90JB02621.
- Caress, David W.; McNutt, Marcia K.; Detrick, Robert S.; Mutter, John C. (1995). "Seismic imaging of hotspot-related crustal underplating beneath the Marquesas Islands". Nature. 373 (6515): 600–603. Bibcode:1995Natur.373..600C. doi:10.1038/373600a0. S2CID 4248074.
- McNutt, M. K.; Caress, D. W.; Reynolds, J.; Jordahl, K. A.; Duncan, R. A. (1997). "Failure of plume theory to explain midplate volcanism in the southern Austral islands". Nature. 389 (6650): 479–482. Bibcode:1997Natur.389..479M. doi:10.1038/39013. S2CID 205026871.
- — (1998). "Superswells". Reviews of Geophysics. 36 (2): 211–244. Bibcode:1998RvGeo..36..211M. doi:10.1029/98RG00255. S2CID 247699784.
- —; Camilli, R.; Crone, T. J.; Guthrie, G. D.; Hsieh, P. A.; Ryerson, T. B.; Savas, O.; Shaffer, F. (2011). "Review of flow rate estimates of the Deepwater Horizon oil spill". Proceedings of the National Academy of Sciences. 109 (50): 20260–20267. Bibcode:2012PNAS..10920260M. doi:10.1073/pnas.1112139108. PMC 3528583. PMID 22187459.
- —; Chu, S.; Lubchenco, J.; Hunter, T.; Dreyfus, G.; Murawski, S. A.; Kennedy, D. M. (2012). "Applications of science and engineering to quantify and control the Deepwater Horizon oil spill". Proceedings of the National Academy of Sciences. 109 (50): 20222–20228. Bibcode:2012PNAS..10920222M. doi:10.1073/pnas.1214389109. PMC 3528582. PMID 23213225.

== See also ==
- Timeline of women in science

Government offices
Preceded by Mark Myers	15th Director of the United States Geological Survey; 2010–2013	Succeeded by Suzette Kimball
Professional and academic associations
Preceded by Ralph J. Cicerone	22nd President of National Academy of Sciences; 2016 – present	Incumbent
