= Mark Myers =

American geologist (born 1955)

Mark D. Myers
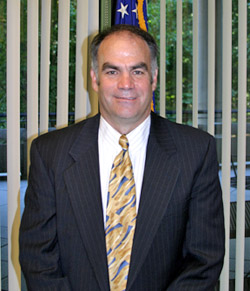
- Myers as Director of USGS, 2006

Commissioner of the U.S. Arctic Research Commission
- Incumbent
- Assumed office September 24, 2021
- President: Joe Biden; Donald Trump

Commissioner of the Alaska Department of Natural Resources
- In office December 4, 2014 – March 1, 2016
- Governor: Bill Walker
- Preceded by: Joseph Balash
- Succeeded by: Andy Mack

14th Director of the United States Geological Survey
- In office September 26, 2006 – January 8, 2009
- President: George W. Bush
- Preceded by: Charles G. Groat
- Succeeded by: Marcia McNutt

Personal details
- Born: c. 1955 (age 70–71)
- Scientific career
- Education: University of Wisconsin–Madison; University of Alaska Fairbanks
- Fields: Geology
- Workplaces: ARCO; Alaska Division of Oil and Gas; U.S. Geological Survey
- Thesis: Evolution of late Cretaceous-early Tertiary depositional sequences in the Beaufort-Mackenzie Basin, Canada (1994)
- Doctoral advisor: R. Keith Crowder

Mark D. Myers is an American geologist who currently serves as a commissioner for the U.S. Arctic Research Commission. He also served as the 14th director of the U.S. Geological Survey (USGS). He was nominated by President George W. Bush on May 3, 2006, confirmed by the U.S. Senate, and sworn in September 26, 2006. Dr. Myers replaced prior director Charles G. Groat, who had resigned effective June 17, 2005.

Anticipating the inauguration of Barack Obama as U.S. president, Myers resigned as USGS director on January 8, 2009, "as is customary during a change in Administrations." On January 21, 2009, Alaska Governor Sarah Palin appointed Myers as coordinator for the Alaska Gasline Inducement Act, responsible to lead efforts to expedite state review and permitting for a proposed natural gas pipeline intended to transport natural gas from Alaska's North Slope to markets in the contiguous 48 states of the U.S.

== Education and career ==
Myers grew up in La Crosse, Wisconsin where he graduated from high school. He earned degrees in geology from the University of Wisconsin–Madison, receiving his B.S. in 1977 and his M.S. in 1981. He served as a pilot and intelligence officer in the U.S. Air Force Reserve from 1977 until 2003, retiring as a Lt. Colonel.

After receiving his M.S., Myers worked for ARCO in Louisiana where he met his wife, Alice. After two years in Louisiana he was transferred to Alaska. In 1987, he entered the Ph.D. program in geology at the University of Alaska Fairbanks. In 1990, he joined the Alaska Division of Oil and Gas as a Petroleum Geologist, where he worked for eight years. In 1994, he completed his dissertation and received his Ph.D. in geology, specializing in sedimentology, clastic depositional environments, surface and subsurface sequence analysis, and sandstone petrography. He then served as Senior Staff Geologist for Exploration at ARCO Alaska Inc. and Phillips Alaska Inc. In 2000 Myers was chosen as Alaska State Geologist and Director of Alaska's Division of Oil and Gas, which included the Alaska Geological and Geophysical Survey.

Myers was one of six officials in the Alaska Department of Natural Resources who resigned on October 27, 2005, in response to Republican Gov. Frank Murkowski's dismissal of the department's commissioner and the position the state has taken in negotiations with oil companies regarding a $20 billion natural gas pipeline to the North Slope.

On September 3, 2010, Chancellor Rogers of the University of Alaska Fairbanks announced that Myers had accepted the position of UAF Vice Chancellor for research, slated to begin on January 24, 2011.

Myers is a past president and board member of the Alaska Geological Society; a certified professional geologist with the American Institute of Professional Geologists; a certified petroleum geologist with the American Association of Petroleum Geologists; and a licensed geologist with the State of Alaska.

In 2014, Myers was appointed by Bill Walker to be the Alaskan DNR Commissioner. He stepped down from the position on March 1, 2016.

In 2021, President Joe Biden appointed him to the U.S. Arctic Research Commission.

== Publications ==
- "USGS Goals for the Coming Decade by Myers, M.D. et al. Science, 12 October 2007: Vol. 318. no. 5848, pp. 200–201. 2007
- "Core lithofacies analysis and fluvio-tidal environments in the AK 94 CBM-1 well, near Wasilla, Alaska" by Flores, Romeo M; Myers, Mark D; Stricker, Gary D; Houle, Julie A. US Geological Survey Professional Paper No. 1614. pp. 57–72, 1999
- "Depositional processes and reservoir continuity within coarse grained basinal lowstand deposits of the middle Brookian sequence; an outcrop study" by Myers, M D. Abstracts with Programs - Geological Society of America, vol. 27, no. 5, pp. 67, May 1995
- "Paleogeographic and sequence stratigraphic reconstruction of the Cretaceous Nanushuk Group, central North Slope, Alaska; Slope Mountain outcrop to the Lupine #1 Well" by Myers, M D; Smith, T N; Krouskop, D L; Ryherd, Timothy J. Abstracts with Programs – Geological Society of America, vol. 27, no. 5, pp. 67, May 1995
- "Evolution of Late Cretaceous-early Tertiary depositional sequences in the Beaufort-Mackenzie Basin, Canada" by Mark D. Myers. Dissertation – University of Alaska at Fairbanks. 255 pages. 1994.
- " Facies variations in the Fish River sequence" by Myers, Mark D. Annual Meeting Expanded Abstracts – American Association of Petroleum Geologists 1992, pp. 95
- "Secondary porosity in immature Late Cretaceous and Tertiary sandstones, Northeast Alaska and Northwest Canada" by Mark D. Myers and T.N. Smith, AAPG Bulletin, vol. 74, no. 5, pp. 727–728, May 1990
- "Sedimentology of Upper Cretaceous-Paleocene strata of the Beaufort-Mackenzie Basin, Canada" by Myers, Mark D; Crowder, R Keith; McGowen, Joe H. Abstracts with Programs – Geological Society of America, vol. 21, no. 5, pp. 121, Mar 1989

Government offices
Preceded by Charles G. Groat	14th Director of the United States Geological Survey; 2006–2009	Succeeded by Marcia McNutt
