= Ned Mamula =

Director of the U.S. Geological Survey since 2025

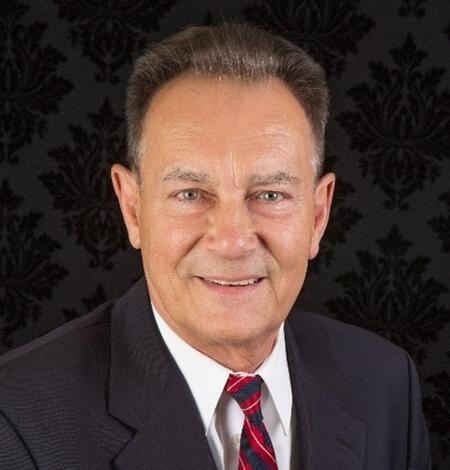
- Mamula in 2025

Director of the U.S. Geological Survey
- Incumbent
- Assumed office November 18, 2025
- President: Donald Trump
- Preceded by: David Applegate

Personal details
- Education: Slippery Rock University (BS), Penn State University (MS), Johns Hopkins University (MIPP), Texas A&M University (Ph.D.)

Ned Mamula is a geoscientist and economic geologist who has served since 2025 as the 19th director of the U.S. Geological Survey (USGS). Prior to his directorship of the Geological Survey, Mamula held roles within the U.S. federal government as well as in the critical minerals industry. From 2023 to 2025, he was employed by GreenMet, a private company focused on mineral mining and processing. He also formerly served as an adjunct scholar at the Cato Institute, and has worked in the U.S. Department of Energy and Central Intelligence Agency.

Mamula is a native of Pittsburgh, Pennsylvania, and worked as a steelworker there before attending Slippery Rock University, from which he received a Bachelor of Science degree in geosciences. He later attained a Master of Science in structural and economic geology from Penn State University, another master’s degree in international public policy from Johns Hopkins University, and a Ph.D. in geology and geophysics from Texas A&M University. He serves on the alumni advisory board of Penn State's geosciences department.

He began working for the USGS in the 1970s and later found employment at the Department of Energy and Central Intelligence Agency, serving at the latter as a geoscientist and intelligence analyst. He became the chief geologist of GreenMet, which provides financing and infrastructure for projects in the minerals industry, in 2023.

In February 2025, the U.S. Senate received a nomination from President Donald Trump for Mamula to direct the USGS. In an interview with E&E News later that month, Mamula stated that he hoped to add uranium, copper, and potash to the federal government's critical minerals list and decrease American dependence on China and other foreign powers for minerals. His appointment as USGS director was confirmed by the Senate on October 7, 2025. According to further reporting from E&E News, one senator, Martin Heinrich, who voted against Mamula's nomination, was concerned about his "track record of spreading disinformation and conspiracy theories".

Under Mamula as USGS director, the Department of the Interior released an updated list of critical minerals, adding ten minerals not included in the previous years—including uranium, copper, and potash—to the list. In his role as director, Mamula has also advocated for shortening the permitting process for mining in order to reduce the amount of minerals the United States must import from China and Russia.
