= James F. Reilly =

American astronaut and geologist (born 1954)

Jim Reilly
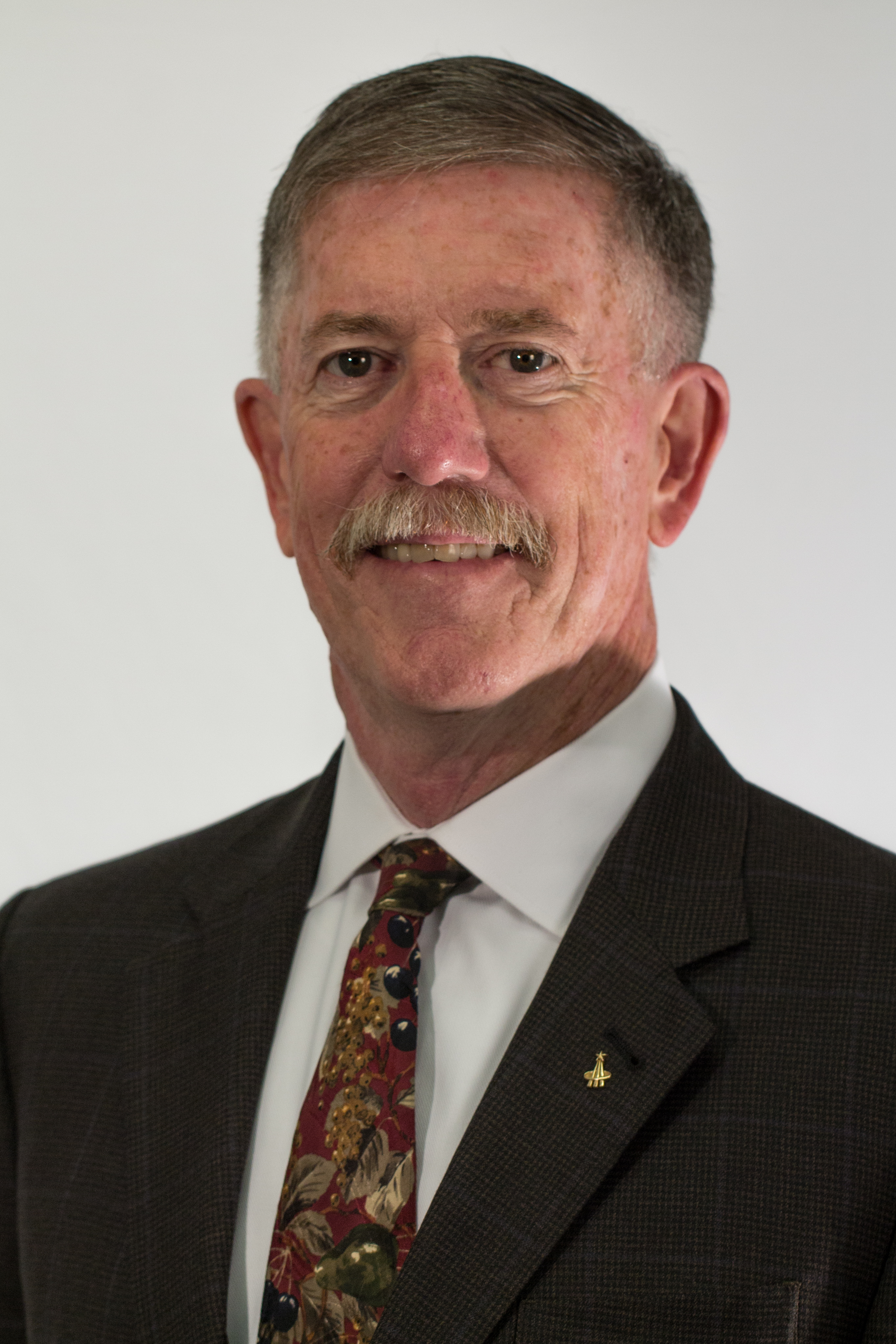
- Reilly in 2018

17th Director of the United States Geological Survey
- In office May 14, 2018 – January 20, 2021
- President: Donald Trump
- Preceded by: Suzette Kimball
- Succeeded by: Dave Applegate

Personal details
- Born: James Francis Reilly II; March 18, 1954 (age 72) Mountain Home Air Force Base, Idaho, U.S.
- Education: University of Texas, Dallas (BS, MS, PhD)

Military service
- Allegiance: United States
- Branch/service: United States Navy
- Unit: United States Navy Reserve
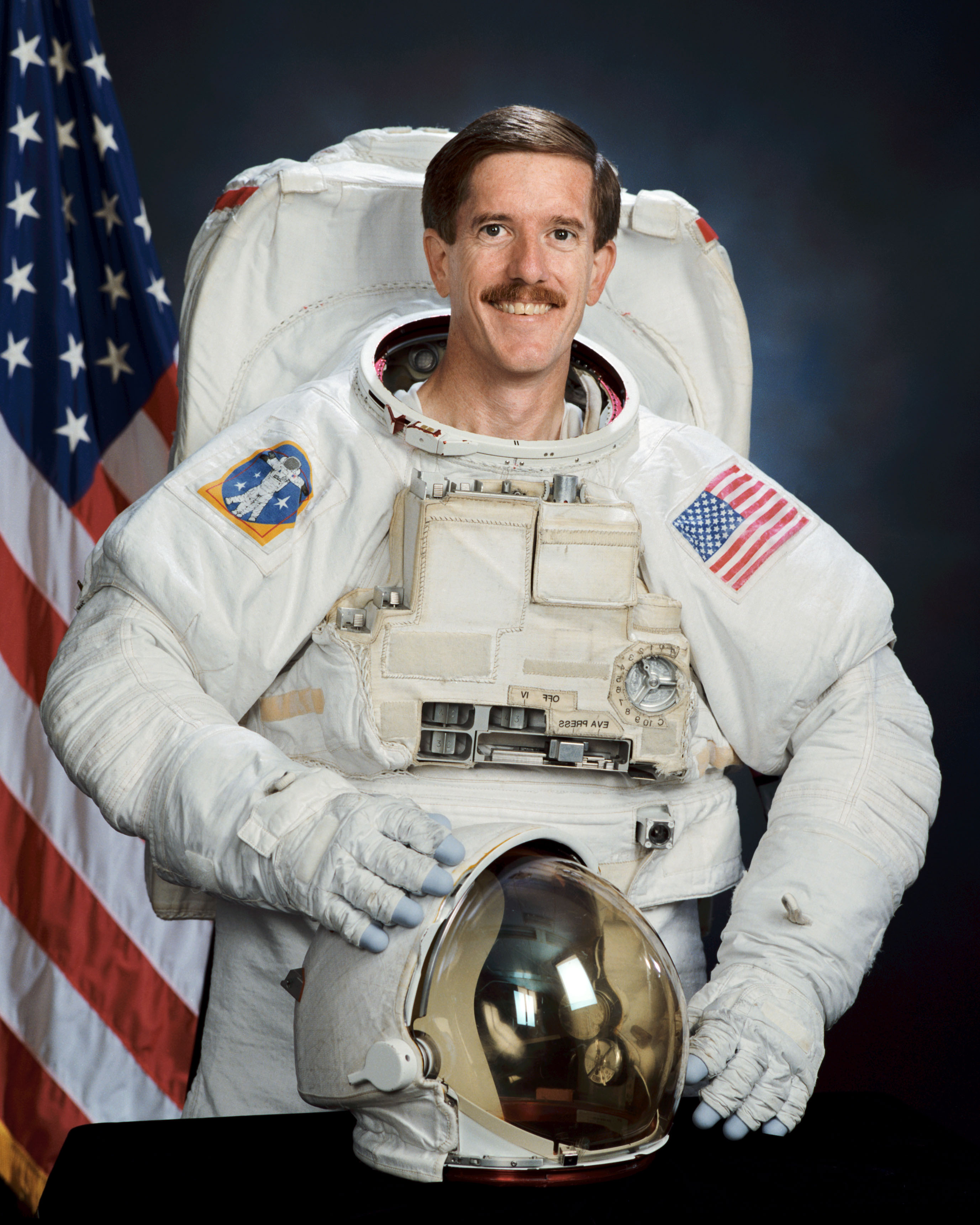
- Space career

NASA astronaut
- Time in space: 35d 10h 34m
- Selection: NASA Group 15 (1994)
- Mission: STS-89; STS-104; STS-117
- Mission insignia
- Scientific career
- Fields: Geology
- Workplaces: NASA; U.S. Geological Survey
- Thesis: Geological Controls on the Distribution of Chemosynthetic Communities in the Gulf of Mexico (1995)
- Doctoral advisor: Richard Mitterer

James Francis Reilly II (born March 18, 1954) is an American geologist, retired astronaut, and honorary United States Marshal who served as the 17th director of the U.S. Geological Survey from 2018 to 2021. He flew on three Space Shuttle missions with the NASA Astronaut Corps: STS-89, STS-104 and STS-117.

== Early life and education ==
Reilly was born at Mountain Home Air Force Base, Idaho, on March 18, 1954, though considers his hometown to be Mesquite, Texas. He graduated from Lake Highlands High School in Dallas, Texas in 1972. He has received three degrees in geosciences from the University of Texas at Dallas: a Bachelor of Science in 1977, a Master of Science 1987, and a Doctor of Philosophy in 1995.

== Career ==
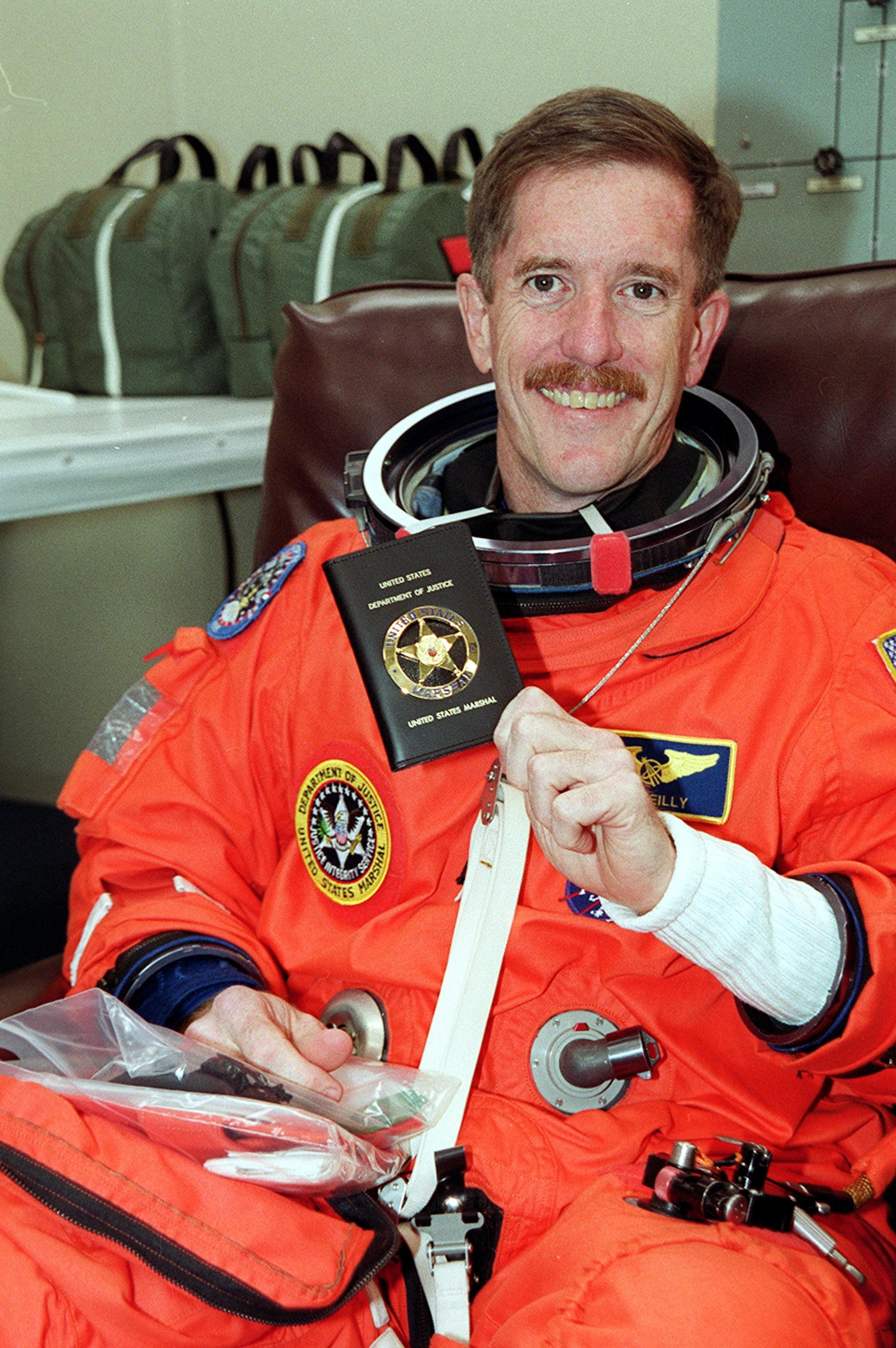
Reilly as a NASA astronaut, holding his Marshal badge

During graduate school, Reilly was selected to participate in the 1977–1978 scientific expedition to Marie Byrd Land, West Antarctica, as a research scientist specializing in stable isotope geochronology. In 1979, he started work as an exploration geologist with Santa Fe Minerals, in Dallas. From 1980 to the time he was selected for the astronaut program, Reilly was employed as an oil and gas exploration geologist for Enserch Exploration, in Dallas, rising to the position of Chief Geologist of the Offshore Region. At the same time, he was involved in applying new imaging technology for industrial applications in deep water engineering projects and biological research. Reilly spent approximately 22 days in deep submergence vehicles operated by Harbor Branch Oceanographic Institution and the U.S. Navy.

NASA selected Reilly for the astronaut program in December 1994. He reported to the Johnson Space Center in March 1995 and completed a year of training and evaluation, and qualified for flight assignment as a mission specialist. Initially, he was assigned to work technical issues for the Astronaut Office Computer Support Branch. Reilly flew on STS-89 (Endeavour) in 1998, STS-104 (Atlantis) in 2001 and STS-117 (Atlantis) in 2007. He has logged over 850 hours in space, including five spacewalks (3 on STS-104, 2 on STS-117) totaling 30 hours and 43 minutes. He has worked both on the ISS and Mir space stations. Reilly was next assigned as the Astronaut Office lead on Shuttle training. Concurrent with his crew assignment he is designated as Payloads and Procedures Operations lead for the Astronaut Office ISS Branch.

From January 2010 to May 2014, Reilly worked as the American Public University System's Dean of the School of Science and Technology.

In January 2018, U.S. President Donald Trump nominated Reilly to be the director of the U.S. Geological Survey. The U.S. Senate confirmed him in April 2018.

After leaving government service in 2020, Reilly later joined defense contractor Booz Allen Hamilton the following year as an executive adviser.

== Organizations ==
Officer in the U.S. Navy Reserve. Member, American Association of Petroleum Geologists, Naval Reserve Association, Tailhook Association, Reserve Officers Association, Association of Space Explorers.

== Special honors ==
- US Navy ROTC scholarship, 1972
- Antarctic Service Medal, 1978
- Seventh Honorary U.S. Marshal, 2001

== Criticism ==
After James Reilly was appointed by President Trump to lead the U.S. Geological Survey he then instructed his office to abandon the traditional practice of using climate models that stretch to the end of the century and instead to only use climate models projecting the impact of climate change through 2040.

His statements on the National Climate Assessment focused on scientific uncertainties rather than directly stating concurrence with opinions expressed by some scientists.

Government offices
Preceded by Suzette Kimball	17th Director of the United States Geological Survey; 2018–2021	Succeeded by Dave Applegate
