= Louisiana Museum of Natural History =

US museum

- Established: 1936
- Location: Baton Rouge, Louisiana United States
- Website: lsu.edu/lmnh

The Louisiana Museum of Natural History is the state's museum of natural history located on the campus of Louisiana State University in Baton Rouge. It houses the LSU Museum of Natural Science (the former Museum of Zoology, hence the collection code LSUMZ), the LSU Herbarium, the Louisiana State Arthropod Museum which contains approximately 1.2 million specimens of insects and related arthropods, and the Textile and Costume Museum.

One exhibit area is the Textile and Costume Museum, and the other is the Museum of Natural Science. The Natural Science branch also has mineralogy, petrology, and palynology collections, as well as the Louisiana Geological Survey data repositories.
