= William Thomas Pecora =

American geologist (1913–1972)

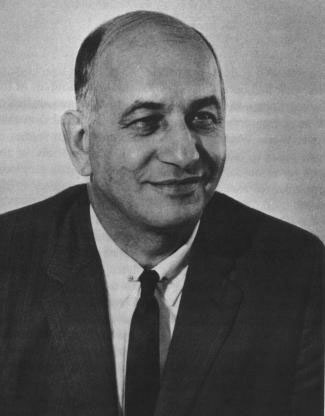

8th Director of the U.S. Geological Survey
- In office 1965 – 1971
- Preceded by: Thomas Brennan Nolan
- Succeeded by: Vincent Ellis McKelvey

Under Secretary of the Interior
- In office 1971 – 1972
- Preceded by: Fred J. Russell
- Succeeded by: John C. Whitaker

Personal details
- Born: February 1, 1913 Belleville, New Jersey, USA
- Died: July 19, 1972 (aged 59) Washington, D.C., U.S.
- Scientific career
- Education: Princeton University (BSE); Harvard University (PhD)
- Fields: Geochemistry; mineralogy; petrology
- Workplaces: U.S. Geological Survey
- Thesis: Petrology and Mineralogy of the Western Bearpaw Mountains, Montana (1940)

William Thomas Pecora II (February 1, 1913 – July 19, 1972) was an American geologist who served as the eighth director of the U.S. Geological Survey and later as Under Secretary of the Interior. Pecora had a successful career in both scientific and athletic spheres: he competed in fencing at the 1936 Summer Olympics, and during his lifetime was elected to both the American Academy of Arts and Sciences and the National Academy of Sciences. He was an early figure in what is now the Landsat program, and the William T. Pecora Award for remote sensing is named after him.

== Life and career ==
William Thomas Pecora II (Note: This generational suffix is listed on his Olympics athlete profile and his Princeton University Libraries thesis record.) was born on February 1, 1913, in Belleville, New Jersey, the son of Cono and Anna Pecora (née Amabile). Both parents were immigrants from Sant'Arsenio, in southern Italy. Pecora was the ninth of 10 children, four boys and six girls. In 1929, the year he graduated from Barringer High School in Newark, he was awarded a Charles Halsey Scholarship providing $1,000 annually towards education at Princeton University, where he majored in geology; he was awarded a Bachelor of Science in Engineering degree in 1933. After graduating, he stayed at Princeton for two years as a geology tutor. In 1933, while a student at Princeton, he won the intercollegiate fencing competition. He was a member of the American team to the 1936 Summer Olympics in Berlin, where he competed in the individual and team foil.

In the summer of 1934, Pecora worked as a field assistant to Erling Dorf, studying stratigraphy in Montana and at the Beartooth Butte Formation. Pecora started graduate studies at Harvard University in 1935, concentrating on optical mineralogy and petrography under the professor Esper S. Larsen, Jr. Larsen encouraged Pecora to look for a thesis study area in the vicinity of the Bearpaw Mountains; Pecora received a grant from the Holden Fund to finance field work in 1937 and 1939 on the range's western fringe. His doctoral thesis was a petrologic study of the Boxelder laccolith. His formal work had been completed when he joined the U.S. Geological Survey (USGS) in 1939, and he received his Ph.D. from Harvard in 1940.

After joining the USGS, his first assignment was in 1940—D. Foster Hewett, head of the metals section at the USGS, frequently visited Harvard until the outbreak of World War II. Hewett established the Strategic Minerals Program and recruited Pecora, who was assigned to study nickeliferous deposits in the western United States and in Brazil, among other locations in North and South America. In total, Pecora and his colleagues described nine new minerals, including whewellite. The significance of this work was described in a memorial to Pecora by Charles A. Anderson:

Bill found that the richer deposits of nickel were the result of long weathering of pyroxenite or peridotite during a complex physiographic history and that serpentinite was not a favorable rock for the residual accumulation of nickel. Garnierite in the nickel-silicate deposit near Riddle, Oregon, had three modes of occurrence, reflecting an orderly variation in color, specific gravity, and nickel content, which serve as useful guides for economic geologists.

Pecora married Ethelwyn Elizabeth Carter of Franklin County, Kentucky, on April 7, 1947. They had two children, William Carter Pecora, born in 1949, and Ann Stewart Pecora, born in 1953.

In 1949, Pecora started a large-scale geologic mapping program of eight fifteen-minute quadrangles in the Bearpaw Mountains. There were eight maps published between 1960 and 1963. In 1956, Pecora published a review paper on carbonatites, describing their formation. In a 1962 paper, he concentrated on the carbonatite deposits in the Bearpaw Mountains.

In 1957, Pecora was selected as Chief of the Branch of Geochemistry and Petrology. He established programs in geochronology, experimental petrology, and mineralogy. In 1961, he returned to research in his former capacity. He was named Chief Geologist in 1964 and a year later was appointed Director of the U.S. Geological Survey by President Lyndon B. Johnson. As director, he pressed for programs that would be responsive to emerging national problems, such as investigations of gold resources and offshore oil and gas exploration. He established the National Center of Earthquake Research in response to problems revealed by the 1964 Alaska earthquake. He also advocated for the creation of a remote sensing satellite that would be used to gather information about the surface of the Earth, which became the Landsat program, the longest-running project for gathering images of Earth from space. Pecora was USGS director when the Astrogeology Research Program began in 1963.

Pecora also addressed the discovery of large reserves of oil and gas on the north coast of Alaska in 1968. Under his direction, the Geological Survey made a careful study of the geologic aspects of a proposed pipeline route. From 1947 to 1967 he was a member of the United States Civil Service Commission's Board of Examiners for Geology, concerned with the development and maintenance of standards in the selection of geologists for federal employment. He was an active member of the Survey's Pick and Hammer shows, which were presented annually to make fun of top survey managers. In 1970, Pecora expressed his opposition to burying the Trans-Alaska Pipeline System, reasoning it would be unsafe to place an underground pipeline in Arctic land. He was appointed to serve as Under Secretary of the Interior in the Department of the Interior by President Richard Nixon on April 1, 1971.

Pecora died on July 19, 1972, aged 59, at George Washington University Hospital after having surgery for diverticulitis the previous month. A statement from President Nixon called him "a remarkable civil servant and an internationally respected figure in the scientific community".

The mineral pecoraite was named for him, as was the Pecora Escarpment in Antarctica.

== William T. Pecora Award ==
The William T. Pecora Award was established in 1974 to honor Pecora, and is sponsored jointly by the Department of the Interior and the National Aeronautics and Space Administration (NASA). It is presented annually to individuals or groups that make outstanding contributions toward understanding the Earth by means of remote sensing.

== Awards and honors ==
- 1964 – President, Geological Society of Washington
- 1965 – Member, American Academy of Arts and Sciences
- 1965 – Member, United States National Academy of Sciences
- 1968 – President, Cosmos Club
- 1968 – Distinguished Service Award, Department of the Interior
- 1969 – Doctorate of Science, Franklin and Marshall College
- 1969 – Rockefeller Public Service Award
- 1970 – Member, American Philosophical Society
- 1970 – Doctorate of Engineering, Colorado School of Mines
- 1972 – Public Service Award, American Association of Petroleum Geologists
- 1973 – a 6,000 foot ridge in the Bear Paw Mountains was named Pecora Ridge in honor of Pecora
- Fellow and Councilor, Geological Society of America
- Fellow and Councilor, Mineralogical Society of America
- A Conference and Award are named in his honor.

== Notes ==
Government offices
Preceded by Thomas Brennan Nolan	Director of the United States Geological Survey; 1965–1971	Succeeded by Vincent Ellis McKelvey
