= David Applegate (geologist) =

American geologist

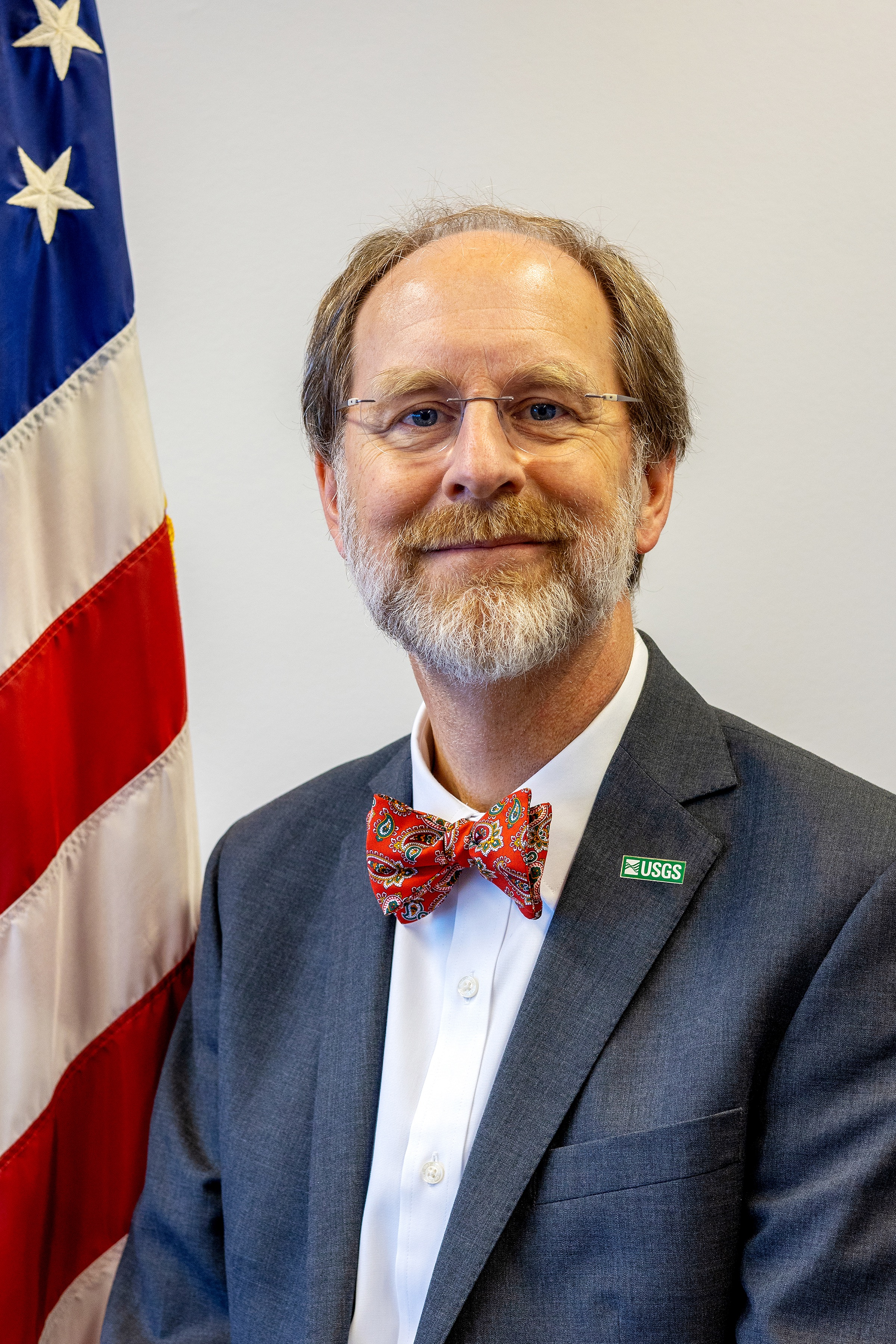
- Applegate in 2022

18th Director of the United States Geological Survey
- In office August 15, 2022 – January 20, 2025
- President: Joe Biden
- Preceded by: James F. Reilly
- Succeeded by: Ned Mamula
- Acting
- In office January 20, 2021 – August 15, 2022

Personal details
- Education: Yale University (BS); Massachusetts Institute of Technology (PhD)
- Scientific career
- Fields: Geology
- Workplaces: Johns Hopkins University; United States Geological Survey; University of Utah
- Thesis: The unroofing history of the funeral mountains metamorphic core complex, California (1994)
- Doctoral advisor: Kip Hodges

David Applegate is an American scientist who served as the 18th director of the United States Geological Survey from 2022 to 2025. He is also a professor at the University of Utah.

== Education ==
Applegate earned a Bachelor of Science degree in geology from Yale University and a PhD in geology from the Massachusetts Institute of Technology.

== Career ==
Applegate is an adjunct full professor at the University of Utah. From 2004 to 2011, he served as senior science advisor for earthquake and geologic hazards at the United States Geological Survey. Since May 2011, he has served as associate director of the USGS for natural hazards.

== USGS Nomination ==
On January 20, 2021, Applegate began serving as acting director of the USGS. On March 8, 2022, President Joe Biden nominated Applegate to serve as director of the agency. Hearings on his nomination were held before the Senate Energy Committee on April 28, 2022. The committee favorably reported his nomination to the Senate floor on June 14, 2022. His nomination was confirmed by the Senate by voice vote. He was sworn in by Interior Secretary Deb Haaland on August 15, 2022. After resigning from the Director position, he became the Chief Scientist of the USGS.

Government offices
Preceded by James F. Reilly	18th Director of the United States Geological Survey; 2021 – 2025	Succeeded by
