= Suzette Kimball =

American geologist

Suzette M. Kimball
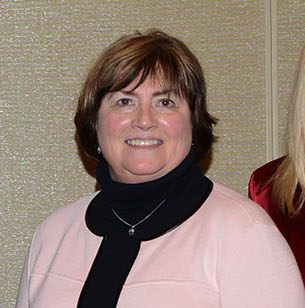
- Kimball in 2014

16th Director of the United States Geological Survey
- In office 2013 – 2017
- President: Barack Obama
- Preceded by: Marcia McNutt
- Succeeded by: James F. Reilly

Personal details
- Education: College of William & Mary (BA); Ball State University (MS); University of Virginia (PhD)
- Scientific career
- Fields: Geology and Geophysics; Environmental Science; Oceanography
- Workplaces: United States Geological Survey
- Thesis: Regional wave climate and shoreline response (North Carolina) (1983)

Suzette M. Kimball is an American geologist and environmental scientist who served as the 16th director of the United States Geological Survey (USGS), a bureau of the United States Department of the Interior.

== Education ==
Kimball earned her B.A. in English and geology from the College of William & Mary in 1973; her M.S. in geology and geophysics from Ball State University; and her Ph.D in environmental sciences with a specialty in coastal processes from the University of Virginia in 1983.

== Career ==
Kimball held several positions at the USGS including Eastern Regional Director, and Acting Associate Director for Geology. Prior to joining the USGS, she served in the National Park Service as a research coordinator in the Global Climate Change Program, Southeast Regional Chief Scientist, and Associate Regional Director. Before joining the U.S. federal government, she was an assistant professor of environmental sciences at the University of Virginia; co-director of the Center for Coastal Management and Policy; and marine scientist at the Virginia Institute of Marine Science.

== Publications ==
Kimball has authored or contributed to a number of publications on topics scientific research including coastal zone management and policy, coastal ecosystem science, barrier island dynamics, and natural resource exploration, evaluation and management. Some selected references include:

- Chen, Zi-Qiang, Carl H. Hobbs III, John F. Wehmiller, and Suzette M. Kimball. "Late Quaternary paleochannel systems on the continental shelf, south of the Chesapeake Bay entrance." Journal of Coastal Research, vol. 11, no. 3 (1995): 605–614.
- Kimball, Suzette, James K. Dames, and Carl Heywood Hobbs. Investigation of Isolated Sand Shoals on the Inner Shelf of Southern Virginia: Final Report. College of William and Mary, School of Marine Science, Virginia Institute of Marine Science, 1991.
- Boon, John Daniel, Suzette M. Kimball, Daniel Ary Hepworth, and Kyung Duck Suh. Chesapeake Bay Wave Climate: Thimble Shoals Wave Station, Report and Summary of Wave Observations, September 27, 1988 Through October 17, 1989. Division of Geological and Benthic Oceanography, Virginia Institute of Marine Science and School of Marine Science, College of William and Mary, 1990.
- Dolan, Robert, Fred Anders, and Suzette Kimball. National Atlas: Coastal Erosion and Accretion. US Geological Survey, 1988.
- Anders, Fred J., Steven G. Underwood, and Suzette M. Kimball. "Beach and nearshore sediment sampling on a developed barrier, Fenwick Island, Maryland." In Coastal Sediments (1987), pp. 1732–1744. ASCE, 1987.
- May, Suzette Kimball. "Regional wave climate and shoreline response." PhD diss., University of Virginia, 1983.

Government offices
Preceded by Marcia McNutt	16th Director of the United States Geological Survey; 2015–2017	Succeeded by William Werkheiser, acting James F. Reilly
