= Director of the U.S. Geological Survey =

- Seal of the USGS

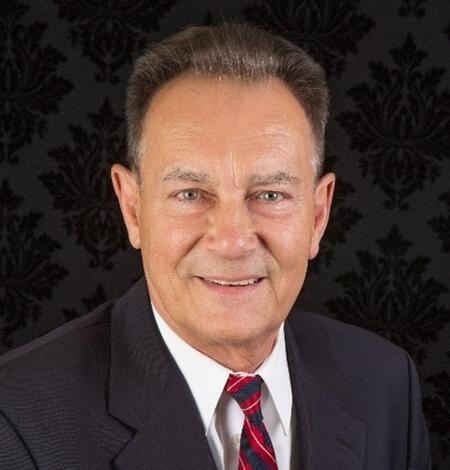
- Incumbent; Ned Mamula since November 18, 2025
- U.S. Geological Survey
- Reports to: Assistant Secretary for Water and Science, U.S. Department of the Interior
- Appointer: President of the United States with advice and consent of the Senate

The director of the U.S. Geological Survey (USGS) is responsible for direction and leadership of the agency. Within the director's office are the deputy director, who assists the director in coordination of the USGS; and eight associate directors, each overseeing a particular program, who report to the director. The director is typically sworn in by the secretary of the interior—for example, Bruce Babbitt swore in Charles Groat, and Deb Haaland swore in David Applegate.

== History ==
The U.S. Geological Survey was established in 1879 by an act of Congress. Clarence King was appointed as the first director. King was picked because he was the leader of a USGS predecessor survey.

Later, in 2018, during the confirmation of James Reilly at a hearing with the Senate Committee on Energy and Natural Resources, the committee emphasized the fact that the appointee would have to protect scientific integrity within the USGS. This was a new theme, stemming from concerns over other people nominated to positions by President Trump. It was also noted that Trump had taken more than a year to announce Reilley's nomination, which was noted by The Washington Post as a departure from the usual time a president would take to nominate someone for the role.

== List of USGS directors ==
The following persons have led the U.S. Geological Survey since 1879 as director:

No.	Portrait	Director	Term start	Term end	Notes
1		Clarence King	1879	1881	
2		John Wesley Powell	1881	1894	
3		Charles Doolittle Walcott	1894	1907	
4		George Otis Smith	1907	1930	
5		Walter Curran Mendenhall	1930	1943	
6		William Embry Wrather	1943	1956	
7		Thomas Brennan Nolan	1956	1965	
8		William Thomas Pecora	1965	1971	
9		Vincent Ellis McKelvey	1971	1978	
10		Henry William Menard	1978	1981	
11		Dallas Lynn Peck	1981	1993	
12		Gordon P. Eaton	March 14, 1994	October 1, 1997	
acting		Thomas Casadevall	October 2, 1997	November 12, 1998	
13		Charles G. Groat	November 13, 1998	June 17, 2005	
acting		P. Patrick Leahy	June 18, 2005	September 25, 2006	
14		Mark Myers	September 26, 2006	January 8, 2009	
acting		Suzette Kimball	January 9, 2009	November 4, 2009	
15		Marcia McNutt	November 5, 2009	February 15, 2013	
acting		Suzette Kimball	February 16, 2013	January 7, 2014	
16		Suzette Kimball	January 8, 2014	January 20, 2017	
acting		William Werkheiser	January 20, 2017	May 13, 2018	
17		James F. Reilly	May 14, 2018	January 20, 2021	
acting		David Applegate	January 20, 2021	August 14, 2022	
18		David Applegate	August 15, 2022	January 20, 2025	
acting		Sarah J. Ryker	January 20, 2025	November 18, 2025	
19		Ned Mamula	November 18, 2025	Present	
