= Public Accountability Initiative =

US research organisation

- Founded: January 2009
- Website: littlesis.org

The Public Accountability Initiative (PAI) is an American nonprofit watchdog organization investigating corporate and government accountability. Founded in 2008 and based in Buffalo, New York, it operates the volunteer-run online database LittleSis, described by its co-founder "an involuntary Facebook for influential people". LittleSis, a play on the authoritarian Big Brother from George Orwell's dystopian novel Nineteen Eighty-Four, was funded by a grant from the Sunlight Foundation and launched in January 2009. By August of that year it included profiles and financial information on over 28,000 individuals and 10,000 organizations.
