= Louisiana Geological Survey =

The Louisiana Geological Survey is a state geological survey established by the Louisiana legislature by Act 131 in 1934 to serve the citizens Louisiana by collecting, preserving, and disseminating impartial information on the geomorphology, hydrogeology, geology, paleontology, economic geology, and geological resources of Louisiana. The Louisiana Geological Survey was originally part of the Louisiana Department of Conservation. Later it was a division of the Louisiana Department of Natural Resources and finally transferred by the Louisiana legislature's HB 2353 to Louisiana State University. At Louisiana State University, it is part of the Office of Research and Economic Development.

== Activities ==
Over the years, the Louisiana Geological Survey has been involved in a wide range research concerning economic, groundwater, and environmental geology of Louisiana. For example, the Louisiana Geological Survey has conducted detailed investigations of the 1. geopressured-geothermal resources of the Gulf Coast; 2. oils and gas resources, including the Tuscaloosa Marine shale, 3. sand and gravel deposits of Louisiana, 4, geology of individual parishes; 5. coastal subsidence and sea level rise; 6. geology of the Fort Polk region; 7. surface faulting; 8. coalbed methane; and 9. nearshore sand deposits that can be used in coastal restoration projects. In case of the Tuscaloosa Marine shale, seven billion barrels of oil reserves were identified. In addition, the Louisiana Geological Survey has conducted detailed investigations into mapping the extent of and modeling freshwater aquifers. Some of this research included studies into the health effects of groundwater contamination from lignite beds penetrated by individual water wells and the impacts of hurricane storm surges on coastal groundwater resources. This research has been accomplished with millions of dollars of external matching funds obtained from federal, state, and private sources.

In addition, the Louisiana Geological Survey participates in the federally funded State Geologic Survey Mapping (STATEMAP) program for the creation of 1:24000 and 1:1000,000 scale geological maps. As of December 2012, the Louisiana Geological Survey has produced 33 published and 3 unpublished 1:24000 scale geological maps; 18 published 1:1000,000 scale geological maps, and 7 either open file or unpublished 1:1000,000 scale geological maps. Some of these geological maps can be either downloaded from their web site or purchased as hard copies. During STATEMAP sponsored geological mapping in St. Helena Parish, Louisiana, the Louisiana Geological Survey discovered a meteorite impact crater, the Brushy Creek Impact Crater.

Also, the faculty and staff of the Louisiana Geological Survey have been repeatedly involved in preparing for and responding to natural disasters and other emergencies. These natural disasters include hurricanes Andrew, Katrina, Rita, Gustav, and Ike. For example, Louisiana Geological Survey in cooperation with the USGS National Wetlands Research Center, Louisiana Department of Wildlife and Fisheries, and the Louisiana State Police provided critical cartographic and GIS assistance to emergency responders in locating victims during and after Hurricane Katrina struck on August 29, 2005. Also, on September 24, 2005, as Rita hit the southwest coast of Louisiana, the Louisiana Geological Survey assisted the United States Geological Survey in the creation of mapping for Lake Charles, Louisiana, and surrounding communities. It was responsible for the production of the maps.

The Louisiana Geological Survey also educates individual citizens of Louisiana about the geology, paleontology, and resources of their state. Each month, it answers a variety of inquiries from students, teachers, professors, consultants, out of state companies, archaeologists, geologists, and other people who have questions about the geology, environment, and resources of Louisiana. Frequently, people bring in rocks, some of which are suspected to be meteorites, for examination and identification. Survey personal often go to public events, i.e. "Rockin' at the Swamp" (Bluebonnet Swamp Nature Center) to share their expertise with and answer questions from the general public.
