= Gerald Friedman =

Gerald Friedman may refer to:

- Gerald M. Friedman (1921–2011), professor of geology
- Gerald Friedman (economist), economist at the University of Massachusetts at Amherst
- Gerald Friedman (judge), South African judge

== See also ==
- Gerald Freedman (born 1927), American theater director
