= Sidney Powers =

American geologist (1890–1832)

Sidney Powers (September 10, 1890 – November 5, 1932) was an American scientist and petroleum geologist for whom the Sidney Powers Memorial Award is named.

Born in Troy, New York on September 10, 1890, Sidney Powers was of English descent, and was the only child of A. W. Powers, a businessman, and his wife, Matilda Wheeler Page. Sidney enjoyed reading travel books as a young boy, and utilized his family's resources to gain knowledge of the world. Powers was a student at the Troy Academy college preparatory school, and entered Williams College in 1907. In the summer of 1910, he spent time at the Yale Forestry School, but after his graduation from Williams in 1911, geology was a stronger calling to him. From 1911 to 1913, Powers studied at the Massachusetts Institute of Technology, which resulted in a Master of Science degree. From 1913 to 1915, he studied at Harvard University, from which he received Master of Arts and Doctor of Philosophy degrees.

Powers passed the civil service examination to become an assistant geologist in the U.S. Geological Survey (USGS) in 1914, but he worked in the commercial sector for three years before accepting a job with the USGS in 1917. On September 10, seven days before he accepted his position with the USGS, Powers married Dorothy Edwards. Only days after joining the USGS, Powers received a second lieutenant commission for the Engineer Officers' Reserve Corps, but had his service deferred until 1918 while he studied oil reserves with the USGS. He traveled to France and the United Kingdom while on active duty, and returned to the U.S. after the war had ended. He began working for Amerada Petroleum Corporation and published geologic petroleum maps of Oklahoma and Texas, including in the Ouachita, Arbuckle, and Wichita Mountains. He was affiliated with Amerada until his death, first as the chief geologist and later as a consulting geologist.

During his career, Powers became a member of the American Institute of Mining and Metallurgical Engineers in 1917, a fellow of the Geological Society of America in 1920, a member of the Society of Economic Geologists in 1921, and a member of the Institute of Petroleum Technologists in 1925. He died on November 5, 1932, in St. Louis, Missouri, following a gallbladder removal. He now rests in Troy, New York.

== Sources ==
- DeGolyer, E. (June 1934) [1933]. "Memorial of Sidney Powers" (PDF). Proceedings Volume of the Geological Society of America Annual Report. 33 (8): 243–258.
- Freeman, Diane (April 2000). "Friedman: A Powers' Connection". AAPG Explorer. American Association of Petroleum Geologists.
- Wrather, William Embry; Clark, Frank Rinker (March 1933). "Memorial: Sidney Powers (1890–1932)". AAPG Bulletin. 17 (3): 325–343.
