= David R. Oldroyd =

Australian geologist

David Roger Oldroyd (20 January 1936, Luton – 7 November 2014, Sydney) was an English-Australian historian of the geological sciences.

== Biography ==
During WW II, he was sent, with many other children, to the safety of the Lake District. After studying sciences at Luton Grammar School, he entered in 1955 Emmanuel College, Cambridge, where he studied chemistry and geology and graduated in 1958 with a B.A. in Natural Sciences. In 1958 he became, in Harrow, London, a school teacher and, in a ceremony in Stroud, married Jane Dawes. He met her in the National Youth Orchestra — he played the cello and she played the oboe. While teaching, he began to attend evening classes to gain an M.Sc. in the history of science at University College London. In 1962 he and his wife emigrated from England to New Zealand, where he wrote Geology in New Zealand Prior to 1900 as his M.Sc. dissertation. He was examined, and passed postally, by Victor Eyles, and thus gained in 1967 his M.Sc. from University College London. In New Zealand, Oldroyd taught at two high schools, first at Hastings and then at Christchurch. In 1969 David and Jane Oldroyd moved to Australia, where he found employment teaching in the School of History and Philosophy of Science at the University of New South Wales (UNSW). There he received a Ph.D. for his dissertation From Paracelsus to Haüy: The Development of Mineralogy in Relation to Chemistry. Eventually he became the head and professor of this school at UNSW, where he retired as professor emeritus in 1996.

As a science historian, he was a prolific author, who wrote several books and numerous essay reviews, book reviews, book chapters, and encyclopaedia articles. Many of his articles appeared in the journal Annals of Science. His best known book might be The Highlands controversy: constructing geological knowledge through fieldwork in nineteenth-century Britain.

Oldroyd served the International Commission on the History of Geological Sciences (INHIGEO) as Secretary-General from 1996 to 2004 and as vice-president of INHIGEO for Australasia and Oceania from 2004 to 2012. From 2008 to 2013 he was the editor-in-chief of the journal Earth Sciences History of the History of Earth Sciences Society (HESS), which is a member organization of the American Geosciences Institute (AGI).

Oldroyd was elected in 1994 a fellow of the Australian Academy of the Humanities. The International Academy of the History of Science elected him a corresponding member in 2002 and a full member in 2008. He received in 1994 the Sue Tyler Friedman Medal of the Geological Society of London, in 1999 the History of Geology Award of the Geological Society of America, and in 2001 a Centenary Medal from the Australian Government. His last award was the 2014 Tom Vallance Medal of the Geological Society of Australia — the medal was awarded in absentia because Oldroyd was dying from a brain tumour.

== Selected publications ==
=== Articles ===
- Oldroyd, D. R. (1973). "Some eighteenth century methods for the chemical analysis of minerals". Journal of Chemical Education. 50 (5): 337. Bibcode:1973JChEd..50..337O. doi:10.1021/ed050p337.
- Oldroyd, D.R. (1974). "Some phlogistic mineralogical schemes, illustrative of the evolution of the concept of 'earth' in the 17th and 18th centuries". Annals of Science. 31 (4): 269–305. doi:10.1080/00033797400200271.
- Albury, W. R.; Oldroyd, D. R. (1977). "From Renaissance Mineral Studies to Historical Geology, in the Light of Michel Foucault's the Order of Things". The British Journal for the History of Science. 10 (3): 187–215. doi:10.1017/S000708740001565X. S2CID 145182627.
- Oldroyd, D. R.; Howes, J. B. (1978). "The first published version of Leibniz's Protogaea". Journal of the Society for the Bibliography of Natural History. 9: 56–60. doi:10.3366/jsbnh.1978.9.1.56. (See Protogaea.)
- Oldroyd, D. R. (1979). "Historicism and the Rise of Historical Geology, Part 1". History of Science. 17 (3): 191–213. doi:10.1177/007327537901700303. S2CID 210529704.
- Oldroyd, D. R. (1979). "Historicism and the Rise of Historical Geology, Part 2". History of Science. 17 (4): 227–257. doi:10.1177/007327537901700401. S2CID 142853809.
- Oldroyd, D.R. (1980). "Sir Archibald Geikie (1835–1924), geologist, romantic aesthete, and historian of geology". Annals of Science. 37 (4): 441–462. doi:10.1080/00033798000200351.
- Oldroyd, David R. (1984). "How Did Darwin Arrive at His Theory? The Secondary Literature to 1982". History of Science. 22 (4): 325–374. doi:10.1177/007327538402200401. S2CID 142529596.
- Baker, Victor R., ed. (2013). "Maps as pictures or diagrams: The early development of geological maps by D. R. Oldroyd". Rethinking the fabric of geology. GSA Special Paper 502. pp. 41–101. ISBN 978-0-8137-2502-4.

=== Books ===
- Oldroyd, D. R. (1980). Darwinian impacts: an introduction to the Darwinian revolution. Atlantic Milton Keynes, UK: Open University Press.
  - 1988, 2nd rev. edition. Kensington, Australia: New South Wales University Press. 1988. ISBN 0868400335.
- Oldroyd, David (1986). The arch of knowledge: an introductory study of the history of the philosophy and methodology of science. New York: Methuen. ISBN 0416013414.
- Oldroyd, David R. (25 July 1990). The Highlands controversy: constructing geological knowledge through fieldwork in nineteenth-century Britain. University of Chicago Press. ISBN 9780226626352.
- Oldroyd, David Roger (1996). Thinking about the Earth: A History of Ideas in Geology. Harvard University Press. ISBN 9780674883826.
- Oldroyd, D. R. (1998). Sciences of the Earth: Studies in the History of Mineralogy and Geology. Brookfield, Vermont: Ashgate. ISBN 9780860787709.
- Oldroyd, David Roger (2002). Earth, Water, Ice and Fire: Two Hundred Years of Geological Research in the English Lake District. Geological Society Memoir No. 25. Geological Society of London. ISBN 9781862391079.
- Kozák, Jan T.; Moreira, Victor S.; Oldroyd, David R. (2005). Iconography of the 1755 Lisbon earthquake. Praha (Prague): Geophysical Institute of the Academy of Sciences of the Czech Republic: Academia. ISBN 8023943901.
- Oldroyd, D. R. (2006). Earth cycles: a historical perspective. Westport, Connecticut: Greenwood Press. ISBN 0274974215.

=== As editor ===
- Oldroyd, David, ed. (1982). Science and ethics: papers presented at a symposium held under the aegis of the Australian Academy of Science, University of New South Wales, November 7, 1980. Kensington, NSW, Australia: New South Wales University Press. ISBN 0868403520.
- Oldroyd, D. R.; Langham, Ian, eds. (6 December 2012). The Wider Domain of Evolutionary Thought. Springer. ISBN 9789400969865. (reprint of 1983 1st edition)
- Oldroyd, David Roger, ed. (2002). The Earth Inside and Out: Some Major Contributions to Geology in the Twentieth Century. Geological Society Special Publication No. 192. Geological Society of London. ISBN 9781862390966.
- Grigelis, Algimantas; Oldroyd, David, eds. (2006). Abstracts of papers: history of quaternary geology and geomorphology: INHIGEO Conference, 28–29 July 2006, Vilnius, Lithuania. Vilnius: Lithuanian Academy of Sciences.
- Grapes, R. H.; Oldroyd, D.; Grigelis, A., eds. (2008). History of geomorphology and Quaternary geology. London: Geological Society of London. ISBN 978-1-86239-255-7.
