= Johann Beringer =

German physician (1670–1738)

Johann Bartholomeus Adam Beringer (1670—11 April 1738) was a German physician and professor of medicine at the University of Würzburg who became the victim of a hoax and ended up describing fake fossils, Beringer's Lying Stones, and considered their origins in a book entitled Lithographiae imaginibus Wirceburgensis ducentis published in 1726. He discovered the hoax shortly after and tried to recall all copies of the book and took the hoaxers to court but was not able to regain his reputation. A paleontology journal Beringeria is named after him.

== Biography ==
Beringer was the son of J.L. Beringer, a doctor at the Würzburg Julius Hospital. After studying medicine in 1693, he became a professor of medicine at the University of Würzburg, where he was also involved in medicine and dissection. He was the chief physician at the Julius Hospital from 1701.

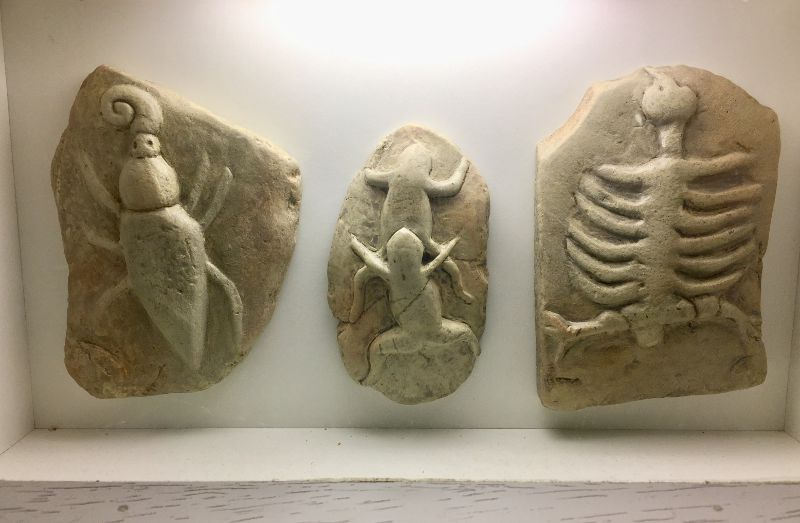
Three of the Würzburger Lügensteine displayed at the Naturmuseum Senckenberg in Frankfurt

Beringer took an interest in oryctics or materials found under the ground. When he got three young boys to help in digging in the area, a few of his colleagues created and planted hoax fossils. These so-called Würzburger Lügensteine became the subject of his 1726 book. Beringer believed that divine providence had placed these fossils at his feet. He was also keen on impressing Prince Bishop Christoph Franz von Hutten, the head of state of Franconia. An elaborate frontispiece to his book included a monument with the emblem of the Prince Bishop of Würzburg. The Prince was involved in pointing out problems with the fossils. Discovering the hoax, he took his collectors to court and they in turn dragged the conspirators Jean Ignace Roderique and Johann Georg von Eckhart to court. Beringer won the case but his reputation could never be restored.

Johannes Christoph Ludwig Beringer (1709—1746), professor at the Heidelberg University was his nephew.

Beringer's publications include:

- Tractatus de conservanda corporis humani sanitate. Würzburg 1710
- Plantarum quarundam exoticarum perennium in horto medico Herbipolensis Catalogus pro Anno 1722. Würzburg 1722
- Lithographiae imaginibus Wirceburgensis ducentis. Würzburg 1726
- Gründliche und richtige Untersuchung der Kissinger Heil- und Gesundheitsbrunnen. Würzburg 1738
