= Henry Robert Frankel =

American philosopher

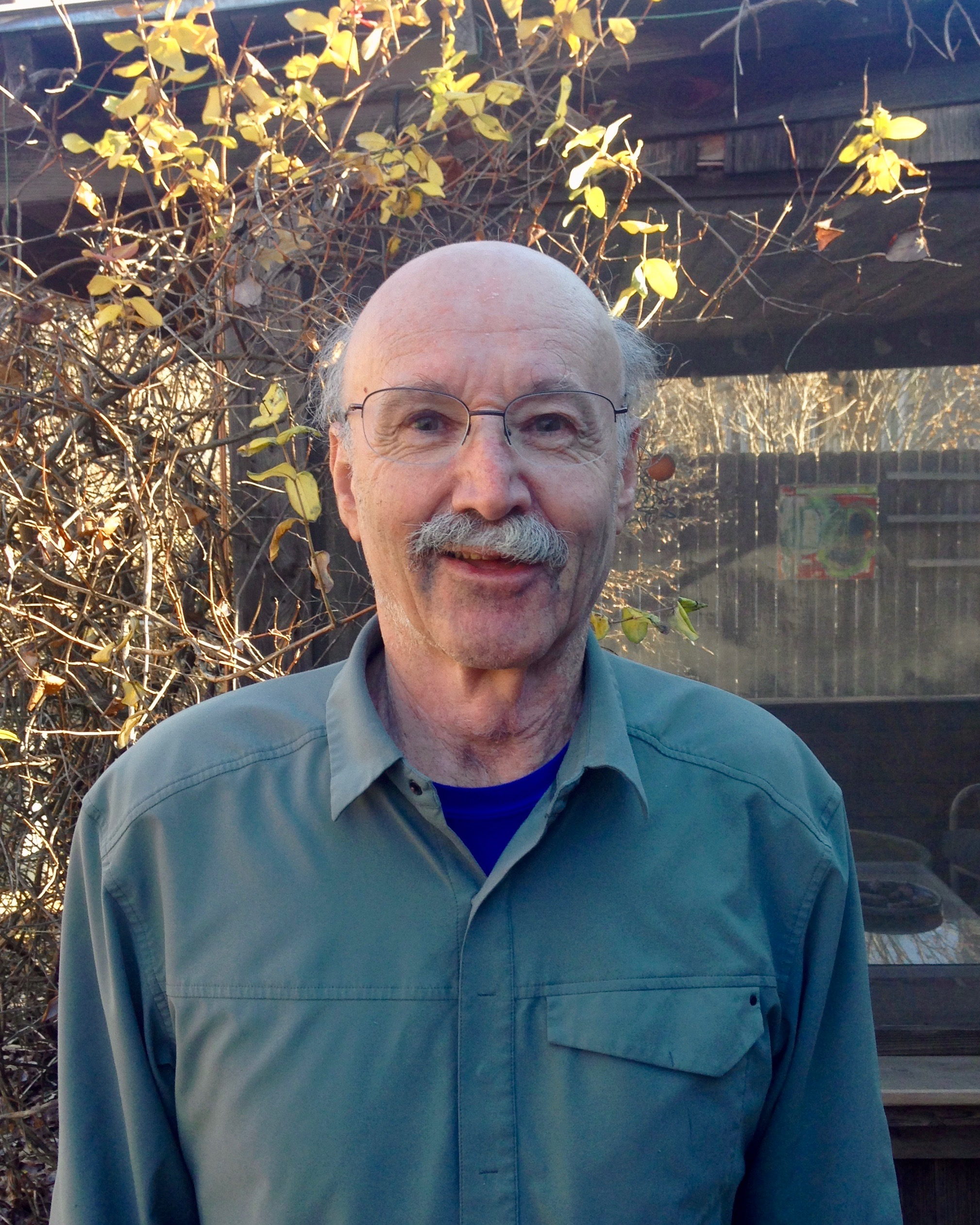
- Born: October 11, 1944
- Died: November 2, 2019
- Occupations: Historian of science, geologist
- Employer: University of Missouri–Kansas City (1971–2014)
- Awards: Sue Tyler Friedman Medal (2013); Mary C. Rabbitt History And Philosophy of Geology Award (2014)

Henry Robert Frankel (October 11, 1944 – November 2, 2019) was an American philosopher and historian of science noted for his historical and philosophical analysis of the continental drift controversy and subsequent discovery of plate tectonics. He was emeritus professor at the University of Missouri, Kansas City. Frankel earned his Bachelor of Arts from Oberlin College and his PhD from the Ohio State University.

== Work ==
Continental drift is the theory which emerged in the early 20th century that the Earth's continents have moved over geologic time relative to each other, thus appearing to have "drifted" across the ocean bed. The idea of continental drift was subsumed by the theory of plate tectonics in the mid-20th century. Plate tectonics explains that the continents move by riding on plates of the Earth's lithosphere. Frankel's four volume work, The Continental Drift Controversy (Volume 1: Wegener and the Early Debate; Volume 2: Paleomagnetic Support for Shifting Continents; Volume 3: Initiation of Seafloor Spreading; and Volume 4: Evolution into Plate Tectonics), published in 2012 by Cambridge University Press, is generally considered seminal and definitive in the field of earth sciences. The work is based upon critical analysis of the entire primary literature and Frankel's 35 years of active correspondence with the leading figures during the revolution's climactic final quarter.

Intellectual historian RJ Mayhew describes the work as "an unparalleled study of remarkable depth, detail and quality of a key development in our ideas about how the Earth functions. ... because Frankel draws on his extensive oral historical work with the key players in the development of plate tectonics, this is a study which can never be repeated in terms of its proximity to the events narrated, so many of those key players now being deceased." Canadian geologist and Sturgis Hooper Professor Emeritus of Geology at Harvard University, Paul Hoffman states that "Every historian of 20th-century Earth science will need these volumes close at hand; there is no substitute." British geologist Anthony Hallam characterizes the work as "veritably Germanic in its comprehensive thoroughness and exceptional attention to detail with extensive interviews and correspondence with leading protagonists and use of archival material." The Continental Drift Controversy was selected as a CHOICE outstanding academic title of 2012 as well as receiving the 2012 Mary B. Ansari Best Research Resource Award from the Geoscience Information Society.

== Selected bibliography ==
- Frankel, Henry (1988). "Plate Tectonics and Inter-Theory Relations". In Donovan, A.; Laudan, L.; Laudan, R. (eds.). Scrutinizing Science: Empirical Studies of Scientific Change. Kluwer Academic Publishers. ISBN 9789400928558.
- —— (2012). The Continental Drift Controversy. Cambridge University Press. ISBN 978-0-521-87507-3.

== Awards and honors ==
Frankel was a Geological Society of America Fellow and recipient of the Society's 2014 Mary C. Rabbit award in recognition of his lifetime achievement in researching and writing about the controversy over continental drift and its evolution into plate tectonics. He was the first philosopher of science to win the award. He also received the Sue Tyler Friedman award from the Geological Society of London in 2013 for his long-term and determined effort to understand the central scientific issues involved in the continental drift controversy. Frankel received the 2015, Thomas Jefferson Award from the University of Missouri for exceptional contributions in advancing the mission of the university.
