= Johann Georg von Eckhart =

German historian and linguist

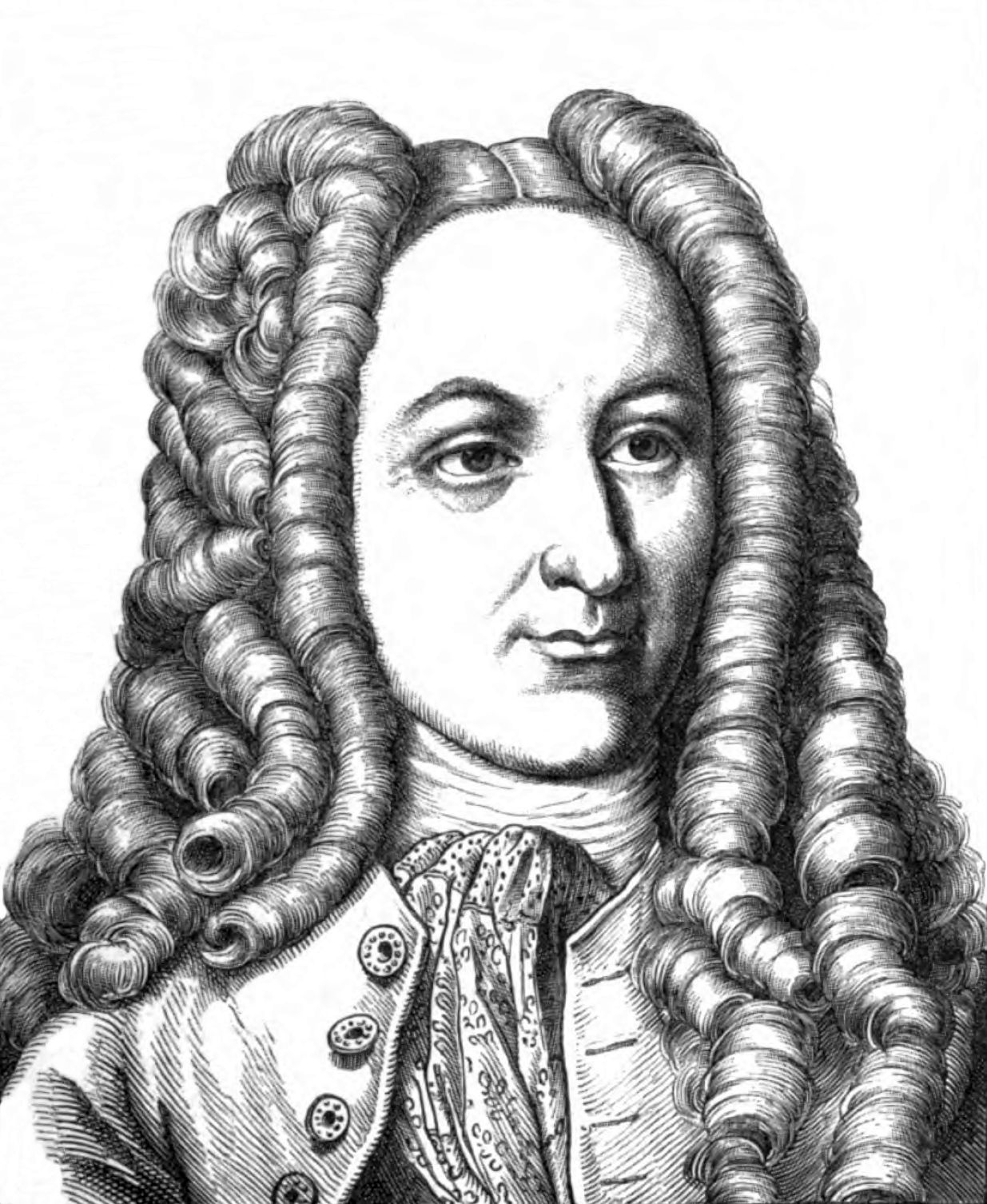
Johann Georg von Eckhart

Johann Georg von Eckhart (7 September 1664 – 9 February 1730) was a German historian and linguist.

== Biography ==
Eckhart was born at Duingen in the Principality of Calenberg. After preparatory training at Schulpforta, he went to Leipzig, where at first, at the desire of his mother, he studied theology, but soon turned his attention to philology and history. On completing his course he became secretary to Field-Marshal Count Flemming, chief minister to the Elector of Saxony; after a short time, however, he went to Hannover to find a permanent position.

Owing to his extensive learning he was soon useful to Gottfried Leibniz, who in 1694 took Eckhart as assistant, and was, until death, his large-hearted patron and generous friend. Through the efforts of Leibniz, Eckhart was appointed professor of history at Helmstedt in 1706, and in 1714 councillor at Hannover.

After the death of Leibniz 1716 he was made librarian and historiographer to the House of Hanover, in 1719 he outlined the Protogaea by the geological formation he had noticed in 1718 at the Ernst-August-Canal of the Herrenhausen Gardens. Later he was ennobled by Emperor Charles VI, to whom he had dedicated his work Origines Austriacae (Lipsia 1721 OCLC 166010541). For reasons which have never been clearly explained he gave up his position, in 1723, and fled from Hanover, perhaps on account of debt, to the Benedictine monastery at Corvey, and thence to the Jesuits at Cologne, where he became a Catholic.

Not long after this, Johann Philipp von Schönborn, Bishop of Würzburg appointed Eckhart his librarian and historiographer. In his work Eckhart was influenced by the new school of French historians, and gave careful attention to the so-called auxiliary sciences, above all to diplomatics; he also strove earnestly to follow a strictly scientific method in his treatment of historical materials. Together with Leibniz he is considered a founder of modern historiography in Germany.

Besides the help he rendered Leibniz, of whom he edited the Collectanea Etymologica (1717) and prepared an affectionately respectful obituary (in Christoph Gottlieb von Murr, Journal für Kunstgeschichte, VII), he issued a number of independent works. His chief work, while professor at Helmsted, is his Historia studii etymologici linguae germanicae haetenus impensi Hanover, 1711), a literary and historical study of all works bearing on the investigation of the Germanic languages. At Hanover he compiled a Corpus historicum medii aevi (Leipzig, 1723), in two volumes; at Würzburg he published the Commentarii de rebus Franciae Orientalis et episcopatus Wirceburgensis (1729), also in two volumes.

In 1725, Eckhart, along with Ignatz Roderick, in order of the Prince-Bishop of Würzburg Christoph Franz von Hutten, reproduced the hoax of their fellow academic Johann Beringer, at the University of Würzburg, in the "Lying Stones" affair. It is likely, that Beringer himself acted as the front-end of the local Jesuits, to aim Eckhart as the follower of the model of natural history, pronounced in the Protogaea.

Eckhart died 1730 at Würzburg at 66.
