= Homer Eugene Le Grand =

American-Australian Historian

Homer Eugene Le Grand Jr. (September 3, 1944, Charlotte, North Carolina – January 16, 2017, Melbourne, Australia) was an American-Australian historian of science. The Geological Society of London awarded him the 1995 Sue Tyler Friedman Medal.

== Biography ==
He grew up with his brother and two sisters in Shelby, North Carolina, where their father was a community leader. After graduating from Shelby High School, Homer E. Le Grand Jr. matriculated at the University of North Carolina at Chapel Hill. With a joint major in chemistry and history, he graduated there in 1966 with a B.A. In June 1966 in Cleveland County, North Carolina, he married Brenda Ann Lefler (born 1943). At the University of Wisconsin he graduated in 1970 with a Ph.D. in the history of science. His Ph.D. thesis is entitled Berthollet and the Oxygen Theory of Acidity. He became a member of the history department of Virginia Tech and for the academic year 1975–1976 went on sabbatical with his wife and their three small children to the University of Melbourne. From 1976 to 1999 he was a faculty member in the history department of the University of Melbourne and was there also the Dean of Arts for several years. From 1999 to 2006 at Monash University, he was a professor in the history department and also Dean of the Faculty of Arts. In 2007 he retired as professor emeritus.

In his research on the history of chemistry, Le Grand argued that Humphry Davy's discoveries enabled 19th-century chemists to fully realize the value of Lavoisier's operational definition of chemical elements as those irreducible elements which validate conservation of mass before and after a chemical transformation. The 2003 book Plate Tectonics: An Insider's History of the Modern Theory of the Earth, edited by Naomi Oreskes with the assistance of Le Grand, contains chapters by some of the most important scientists who developed plate tectonics.

In his honour, Monash University sponsors the Homer Le Grand Student Assistance Scholarship.

Upon his death he was survived by his widow, a daughter, two sons, and eight grandchildren. One son, Alexander Benton, became an orthopedic surgeon in Bozeman, Montana, and the other son, nicknamed "Chip", became a journalist employed by The Australian and The Age.

== Selected publications ==
=== Articles ===
- Le Grand, H.E. (1972). "Lavoisier's oxygen theory of acidity". Annals of Science. 29: 1–18. doi:10.1080/00033797200200331.
- Le Grand, H. E. (1974). "Determination of the Composition of the Fixed Alkalis 1789-1810". Isis. 65: 59–65. doi:10.1086/351217. S2CID 224841900.
- Le Grand, H. E. (1975). "The "Conversion" of C.-L. Berthollet to Lavoisiers' Chemistry". Ambix. 22: 58–70. doi:10.1179/amb.1975.22.1.58.
- Le Grand, H. E. (1976). "Berthollet's Essai de statique chimique and Acidity". Isis. 67 (2): 229–238. doi:10.1086/351586. S2CID 224833287.
- Le Grand, Homer E. (1982). "Chemistry in a Provincial Context: The Montpellier Sociétê Royale des Sciences in the Eighteenth Century". Ambix. 29 (2): 88–105. doi:10.1179/amb.1982.29.2.88. PMID 11611032.
- Le Grand, H. E. (1984). "Theory and application: The early chemical work of J. A. C. Chaptal". The British Journal for the History of Science. 17: 31–46. doi:10.1017/S0007087400020343. S2CID 145125364.
- Grand, H. E. (1986). "Steady as a Rock: Methodology and Moving Continents". The Politics and Rhetoric of Scientific Method. pp. 97–138. doi:10.1007/978-94-009-4560-9_3. ISBN 978-94-010-8527-4.
- Le Grand, H. E. (1990). "Is a Picture Worth a Thousand Experiments?". Experimental Inquiries. pp. 241–270. doi:10.1007/978-94-009-2057-6_9. ISBN 978-94-010-7423-0.
- Zhu, Dajian; Le Grand, Homer (1999). "Plates, politics and localism: Geological theory in china". History and Anthropology. 11 (2–3): 291–327. doi:10.1080/02757206.1999.9960916.
- Le Grand, Homer E. (2002). "Plate tectonics, terranes and continental geology". Geological Society, London, Special Publications. 192 (1): 199–213. Bibcode:2002GSLSP.192..199L. doi:10.1144/GSL.SP.2002.192.01.10. S2CID 219203742.

=== Books ===
- Le Grand, H. E. (15 December 1988). Drifting Continents and Shifting Theories. Cambridge University Press. ISBN 9780521311052.
- Le Grand, H. E., ed. (6 December 2012). Experimental Inquiries: Historical, Philosophical and Social Studies of Experimentation in Science. Springer. ISBN 9789400920576. (pbk reprint of 1990 1st edition)
- Oreskes, Naomi, ed. (8 October 2018). Plate Tectonics: An Insider's History of the Modern Theory of the Earth. CRC Press. ISBN 9780429977916; with the editorial assistance of Homer Le Grand (pbk reprint of 2003 1st edition)
