= Sue Tyler Friedman Medal =

The Sue Tyler Friedman Medal is awarded by the Geological Society of London for work on the history of geology. Established in 1987, it is named after the wife of academic journal editor and publisher Gerald M. Friedman, and was funded by a gift to the Geological Society by Friedman's company, Northeastern Science Foundation, of Troy, New York.

== Sue Tyler Friedman Medallists ==
Source: The Geological Society

- 1988 Martin J. S. Rudwick
- 1989 Stephen Jay Gould
- 1990 William Antony Swithin Sarjeant
- 1991 Hugh Simon Torrens
- 1992 François Ellenberger
- 1993 Thomas George Vallance
- 1994 David Roger Oldroyd
- 1995 Homer Eugene Le Grand
- 1996 Gordon Leslie Herries Davies
- 1997 Martin Guntau
- 1998 Kenneth L. Taylor
- 2000 James Andrew Secord
- 2003 Rhoda Rappaport
- 2005 Ursula Bailey Marvin
- 2007 Jack Morrell
- 2009 Philippe Taquet
- 2012 Cherry Lewis
- 2013 Henry Frankel
- 2014 Edward Rose
- 2015 David Branagan
- 2016 Richard Howarth
- 2017 Mott T. Greene
- 2020 Sandra Herbert
- 2022 John Mather
- 2024 Martina Kölbl-Ebert

== See also ==
- List of geology awards
- Prizes named after people
