= Beringer's Lying Stones =

18th-century hoax fossils

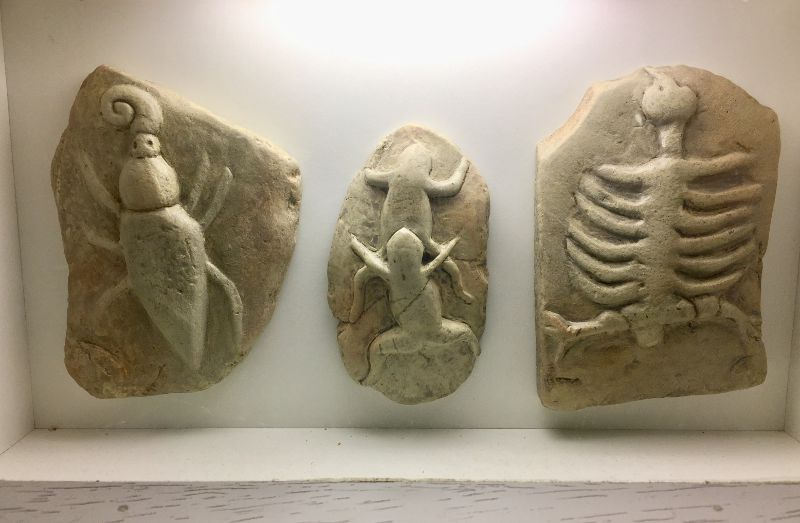
Some Würzburger Lügensteine displayed at the Naturmuseum Senckenberg in Frankfurt

Beringer's Lying Stones (German: Lügensteine) are pieces of limestone which were carved into the shape of various fictitious animals and "discovered" in 1725 by Johann Bartholomeus Adam Beringer (1667–1740), Dean of the Faculty of Medicine at the University of Würzburg. Beringer believed them to be fossils, and because some of them bore the name of God in Hebrew, suggested that they might be of divine origin. The scientific community at the time was still unsure as to what fossils actually were, the notion that they were the petrified remains of once-living organisms being merely one of several competing hypotheses.

Beringer published a book on his findings but shortly after discovered that he had been the victim of a hoax. He took the hoaxers to court and won the case but his reputation was forever besmirched.

== Background ==
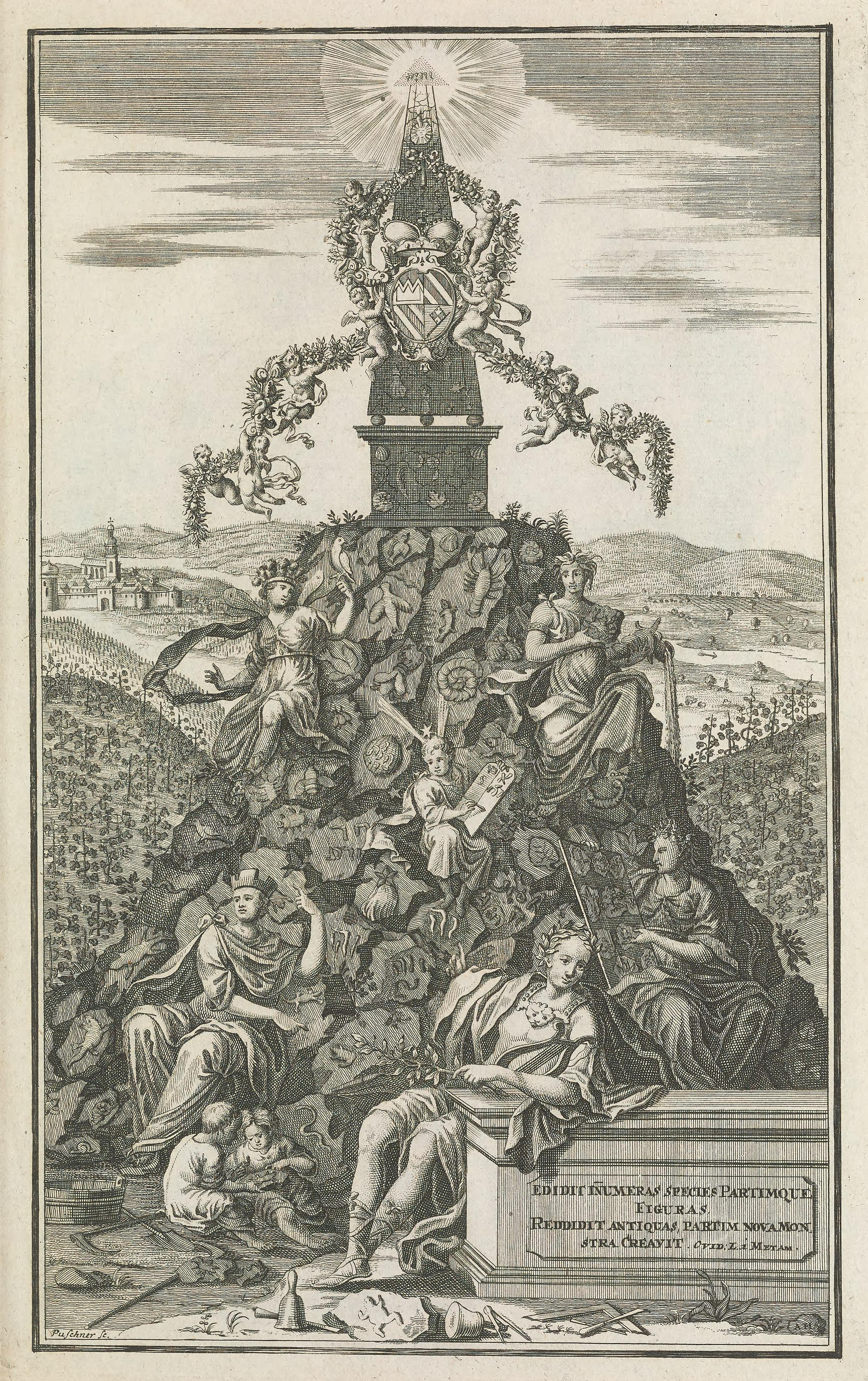
Frontispiece of Lithographiae Wirceburgensis (1726) with a monument at the top to the head of Franconia, Prince Bishop Christoph Franz von Hutten.

Johann Bartholomew Adam Beringer was born in 1667 to German physician Ludwig Behringer. Beringer held high positions including chief physician to the Julian Hospital and dean of the Faculty of Medicine at the university. In addition to all this, he took an interest in oryctics. He had hired Christian Zänger (aged 17), and the brothers Niklaus and Valentin Hehn (aged 18 and 14) to help him search for unusual rocks around Würzburg in 1725. J. Ignace Roderique, a professor of geography, algebra and analysis at the university, Johann Georg von Eckhart, librarian to the university, and Baron von Hof, a local noble, decided to prank the professor as he was considered arrogant. Roderique had figures carved in limestone and had them planted through one of Beringer's assistants. To some of these stones, they added inscriptions such as the Hebrew name of God in Latin, Arabic, and Hebrew characters. They planted these stones on Mount Eibelstadt where Beringer and his assistants frequently went to search for fossils. Beringer began to find many such rocks and without suspecting them began to document them. The hoaxers carved fragments of limestone into shapes of animals such as lizards, frogs, and spiders on their webs.

Beringer published a book with illustrations of his findings Lithographiae Wirceburgensis (1726). Shortly after the book went into print, he realized that he had been duped and took legal action against Roderique and von Eckhart and won the case. The two were removed from their positions at the university and Roderique was banished from Würzburg but Beringer's reputation was forever destroyed. Eckhart lost his post and privileges to use the library and archives. This hampered his own historical research, which was left unfinished at his death. The stones became known as Lügensteine, or "lying stones". Some of the stones have survived to the present and a few are now on display at the Oxford University Museum, and Teylers Museum in the Netherlands.

In his book Beringer examined multiple hypotheses to explain the origin of the stones including that they were the remains of former life forms, formed inorganically, vis plastica, by special creative forces of divine nature or the "capricious fabrications of God". He also considered the possibility that they were the carvings of prehistoric pagans, but he had to rule this out since pagans had no knowledge of the name of God. The idea that they were impressions of former living forms was supported in his time by the belief of the Biblical flood. Some critics had pointed out chisel marks on the rocks and Beringer noted that:

...the figures...are so exactly fitted to the dimensions of the stones, that one would swear that they are the work of a very meticulous sculptor...[and they] seem to bear unmistakable indications of the sculptor's knife... One would swear that he discerned in many of them the strokes of a knife gone awry, and superfluous gouges in several directions.

However, this evidence of sculpting only convinced him more strongly that the chisel was wielded by the hand of God.

Some of the court transcript still exists, and in the testimony the hoaxers make clear that they did indeed want to discredit Beringer, because, they said, "he was so arrogant and despised us all". A 2005 book suggests that Roderique may not have been responsible for the fabrications of the fossil since Roderique was posted to the University of Würzburg only on 11 December 1725 and was in Münster when the stones were found in the summer of 1725. The authors suggested that Beringer himself may have been responsible for the fraud. Beringer spent many years recovering copies of his book. A second printing of his book was made in 1767, well after his death and it was translated into English in 1963.

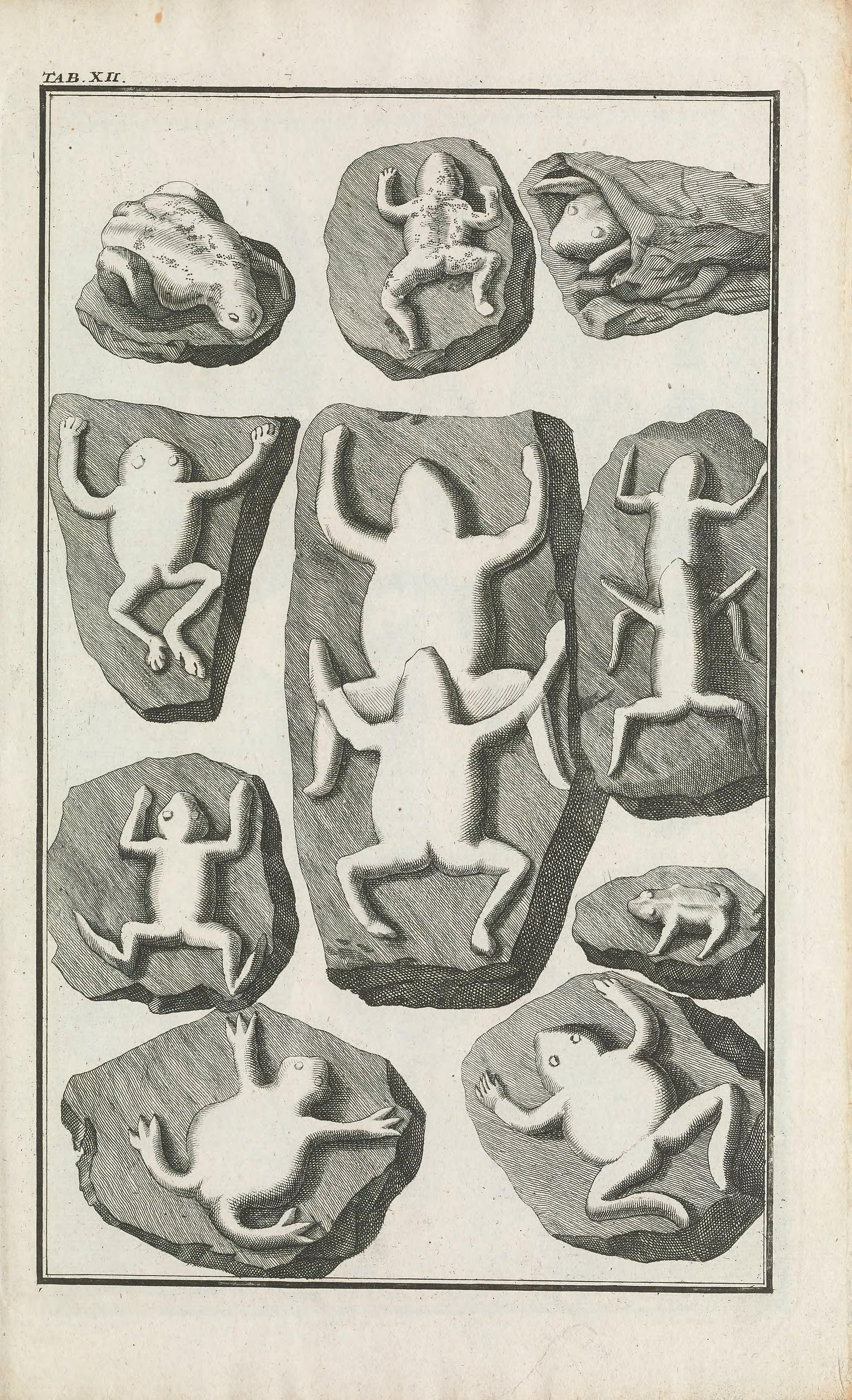
Frogs and lizards

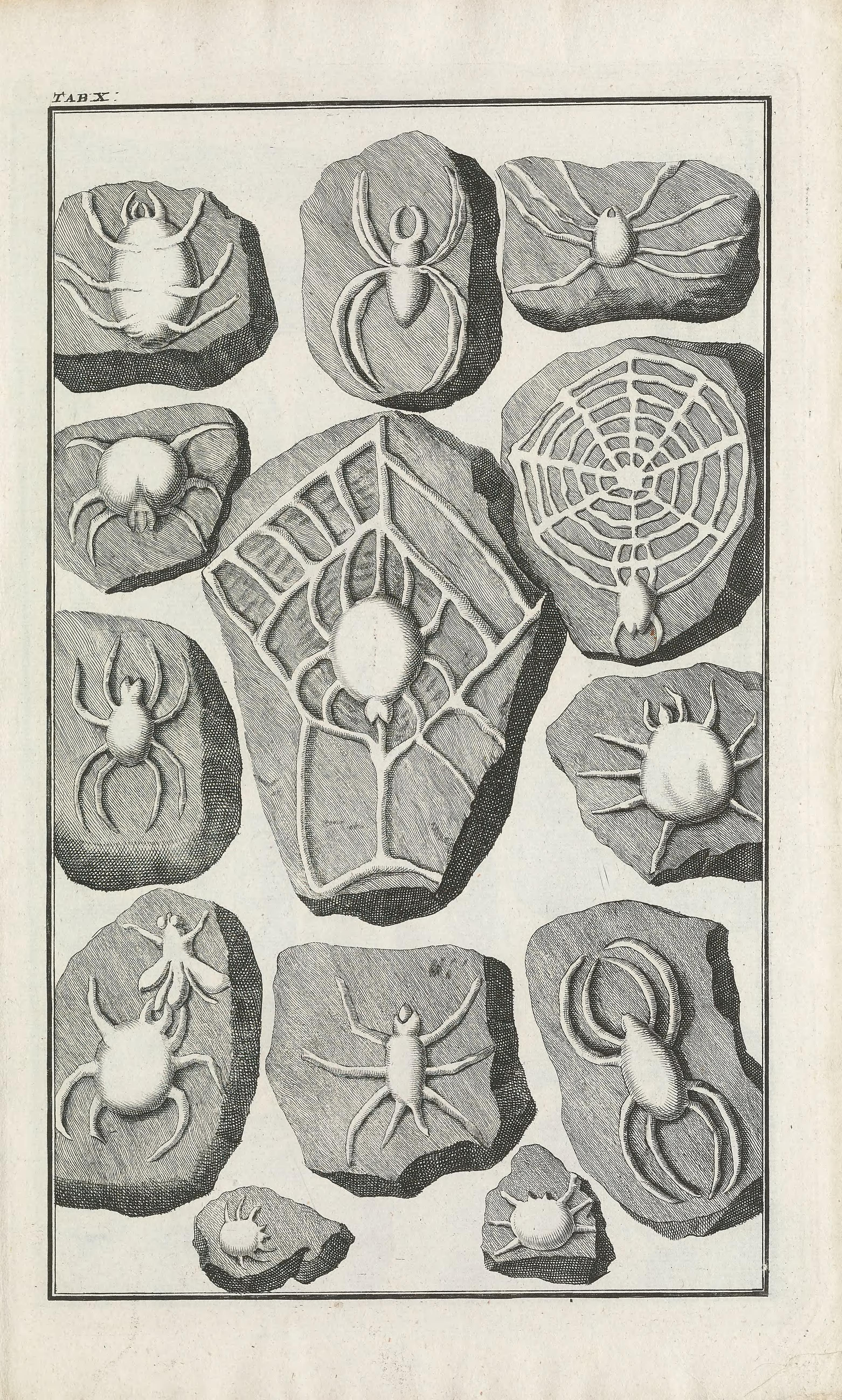
Showing spiders with webs

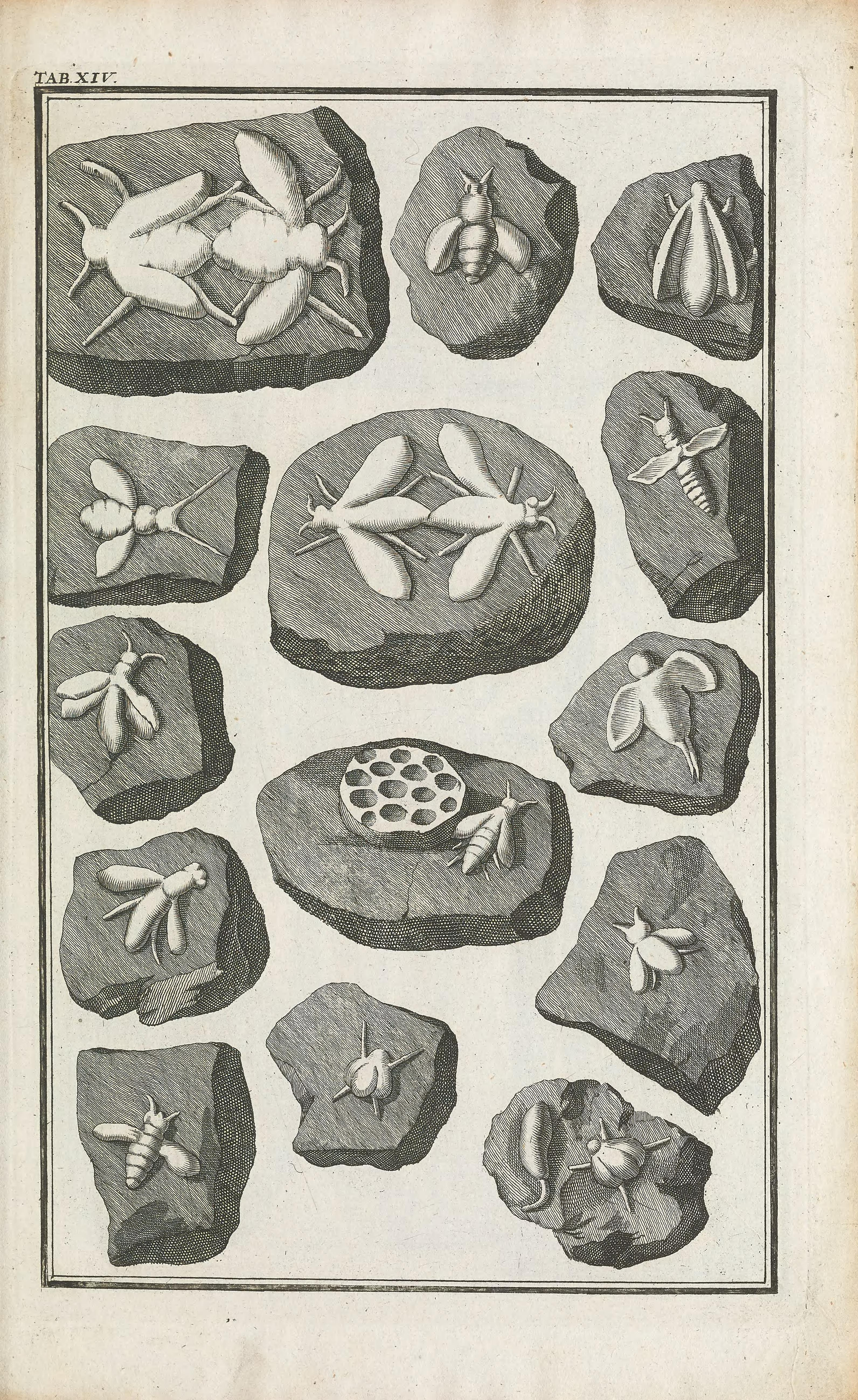
Insects

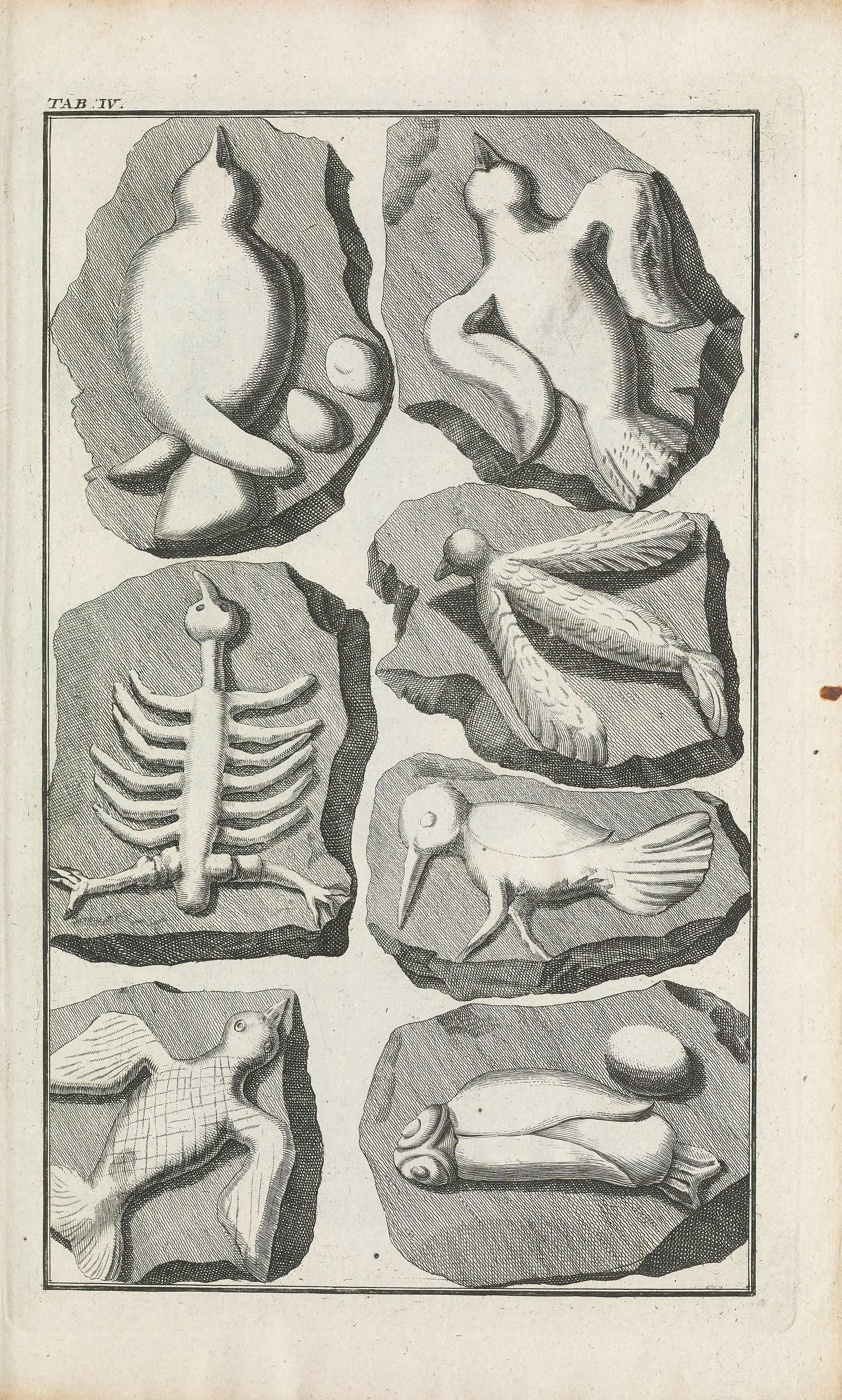
Birds

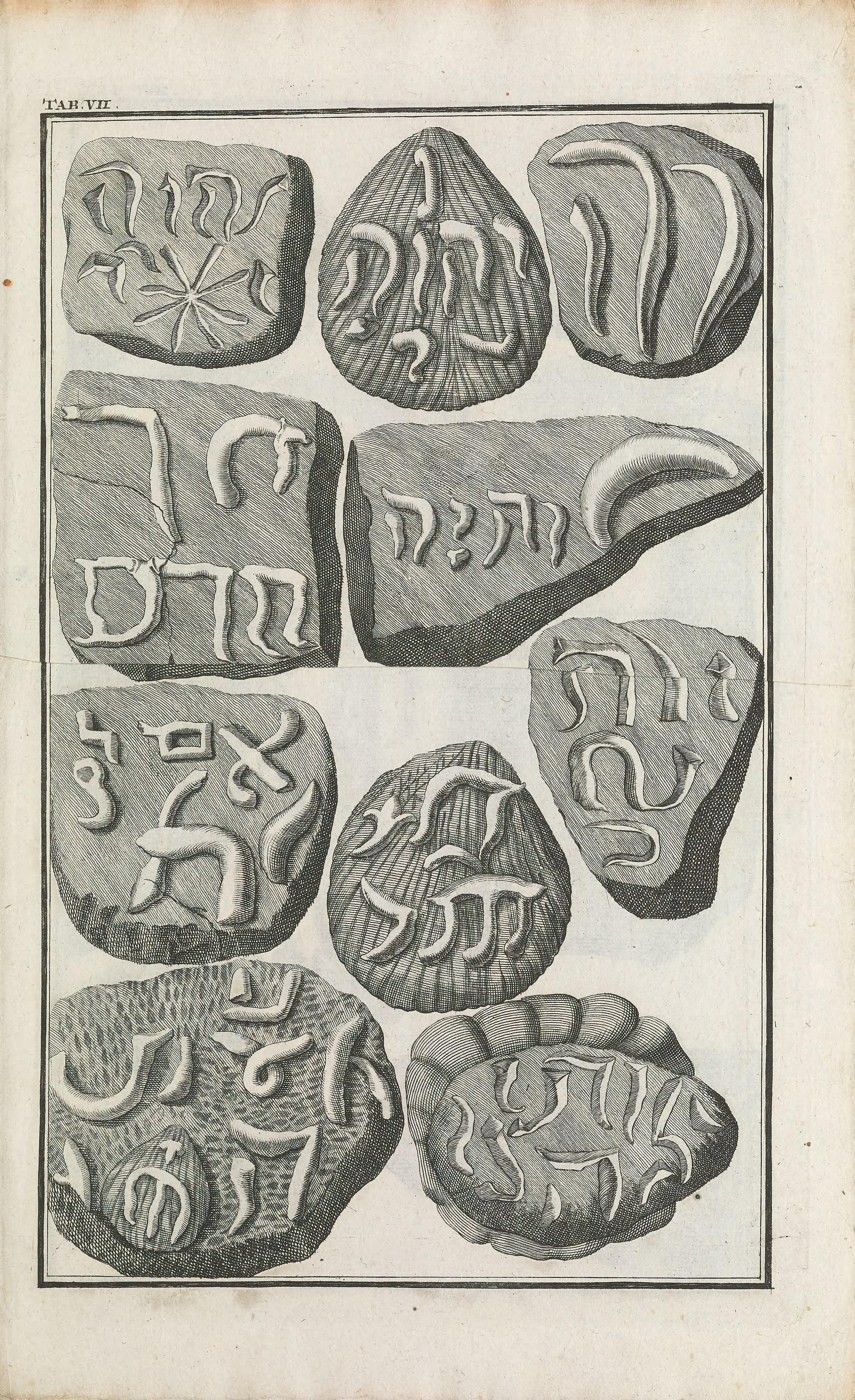
Hebrew inscriptions
