= Walter Curran Mendenhall =

American geologist (1871–1957)

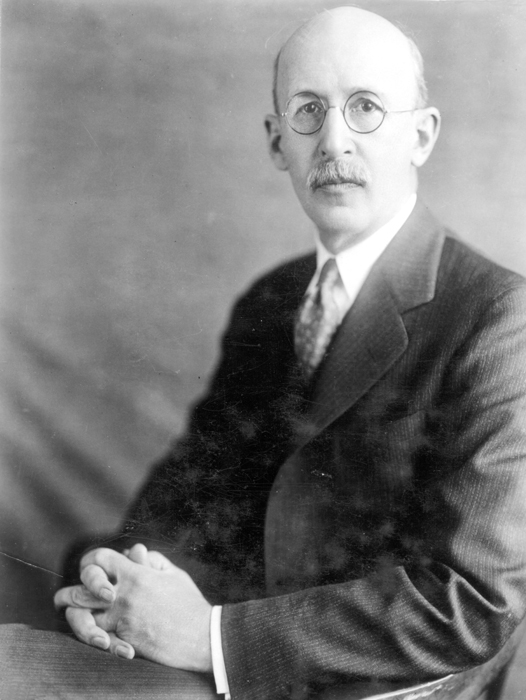
- Mendenhall, the fifth director of USGS for 14 years, 1930–1943

5th Director of the United States Geological Survey
- In office 1930 – 1943
- Preceded by: George Otis Smith
- Succeeded by: William Embry Wrather

Personal details
- Born: February 20, 1871 Marlboro, Ohio, U.S.
- Died: June 2, 1957 (aged 86) Chevy Chase, Maryland, U.S.
- Scientific career
- Education: Ohio Normal University
- Awards: Penrose Gold Medal, 1944
- Fields: Geology, hydrology
- Workplaces: US Geological Survey

Walter Curran Mendenhall (February 20, 1871 – June 2, 1957) was the fifth director of the United States Geological Survey.

== Life ==
Mendenhall was born in Marlboro, Ohio to William King Mendenhall and Emma P. Garrigues. He graduated from Ohio Normal University. He married Alice May Boutelle (born 1876); the couple had two daughters, Margaret Boutelle Mendenhall (born 1916) and Alice Curran Mendenhall (born 1918).

He was a distant relation of Thomas Corwin Mendenhall, superintendent of the United States Coast and Geodetic Survey.

== USGS career ==
In December 1930, Hoover appointed George Otis Smith to the newly reorganized Federal Power Commission and then appointed Mendenhall to succeed Smith as director of the United States Geological Survey, honoring not only a commitment to appoint the heads of scientific agencies from within the U.S. federal civil service but also a commitment to support basic research. Mendenhall and Smith were both 59 years old. Mendenhall had joined the Survey in 1894, fresh from Ohio Normal University, and had mapped in the Appalachian coal fields. In 1898, he had been one of the pioneer geologists in Alaska and was attached to expeditions crossing the Alaska Range. He was among the first non-native people to cross Isabel Pass. In 1903 he had become one of the first ground-water specialists in the Water Resources Branch.

An early member of the Land Classification Board, Mendenhall became its chairman in 1911, and in 1912 he became the first chief of the Land Classification Branch. For eight years before becoming director, he had been the chief geologist. Although more than half his surveying career had been in administrative work, he had made notable contributions to the study of the geology of Alaska, and his study of the principles in ground-water hydrology had helped to establish it as a field of scientific endeavor. King, Powell, Walcott, and Mendenhall all were members of the United States National Academy of Sciences.

A year after Mendenhall became director, the United States Government cut its budget sharply as the United States began to feel the effects of the Great Depression. The appropriations were not restored to earlier levels until the late 1930s, shortly before the outbreak of World War II, but the Survey subsisted, even grew, on funds transferred from agencies the Franklin D. Roosevelt administration formed to combat the Great Depression. The Tennessee Valley Authority, established in May 1933, turned to the Survey to meet its need for maps of the entire Tennessee Valley and for a much-expanded program of stream gauging throughout the basin.

In 1943, as the U.S. Government began planning for the post-World War II era, Director Mendenhall, who had served two years beyond the mandatory retirement age by presidential exemption, was succeeded by William Embry Wrather.

Mendenhall's directorate was pivotal in the history of the Geological Survey. In spite of the difficult times — the Great Depression years and the beginning of World War II — in which he held the position, he encouraged the Survey, as he had the Geologic Branch, to emphasize the necessity of basic research and created an environment in which, in the words of the Engineering and Mining Journal, "scientific research, technical integrity, and practical skill could flourish."

Mendenhall died in Chevy Chase, Maryland, in 1957.

== Publications ==
- Mendenhall, Walter Curran, "Progress in physics in the nineteenth century" Sun Publishing, c1901.
- Mendenhall, Walter Curran, "Reconnaissance from Fort Hamlin to Kotzebue Sound Alaska" USGS Professional Paper No.10. (1902)
- Mendenhall, Walter Curran, and Schrader, F.C. "The mineral resources of the Mount Wrangell district, Alaska" USGS Professional Paper No.15, (1903)
- Mendenhall, Walter Curran, "Development of underground waters in the eastern coastal plain region of southern California" USGS Water Supply Paper No.137. (1905)
- Mendenhall, Walter Curran, "Development of underground waters in the central coastal plain region of Southern California" USGS Water Supply Paper No.138. (1905)
- Mendenhall, Walter Curran, "Development of underground waters in the western coastal-plain region of southern California" USGS Water Supply Paper No.139. (1905)
- Mendenhall, Walter Curran, "Geology of the Central Copper River region, Alaska" USGS Professional Paper No.41, (1905)
- Leighton, Morris Morgan, "Walter Curran Mendenhall (1871-1957)" AAPG Bulletin; March 1958; v. 42; no. 3; p. 682-690
- Deming, D. "Walter Curran Mendenhall: Quaker scientist" Ground Water. 2004 May-Jun;42(3):465-71.
- Mendenhall, Walter Curran, "Some desert watering places in southeastern California and southwestern Nevada" USGS Water Supply Paper No.224. (1909)
- Mendenhall, Walter Curran, "Ground waters of the Indio region, California, with a sketch of the Colorado desert" USGS Water Supply Paper No.225. (1909)

Preceded by George Otis Smith	Director of the United States Geological Survey; 1930–1943	Succeeded by William Embry Wrather
