= Mott T. Greene =

American historian

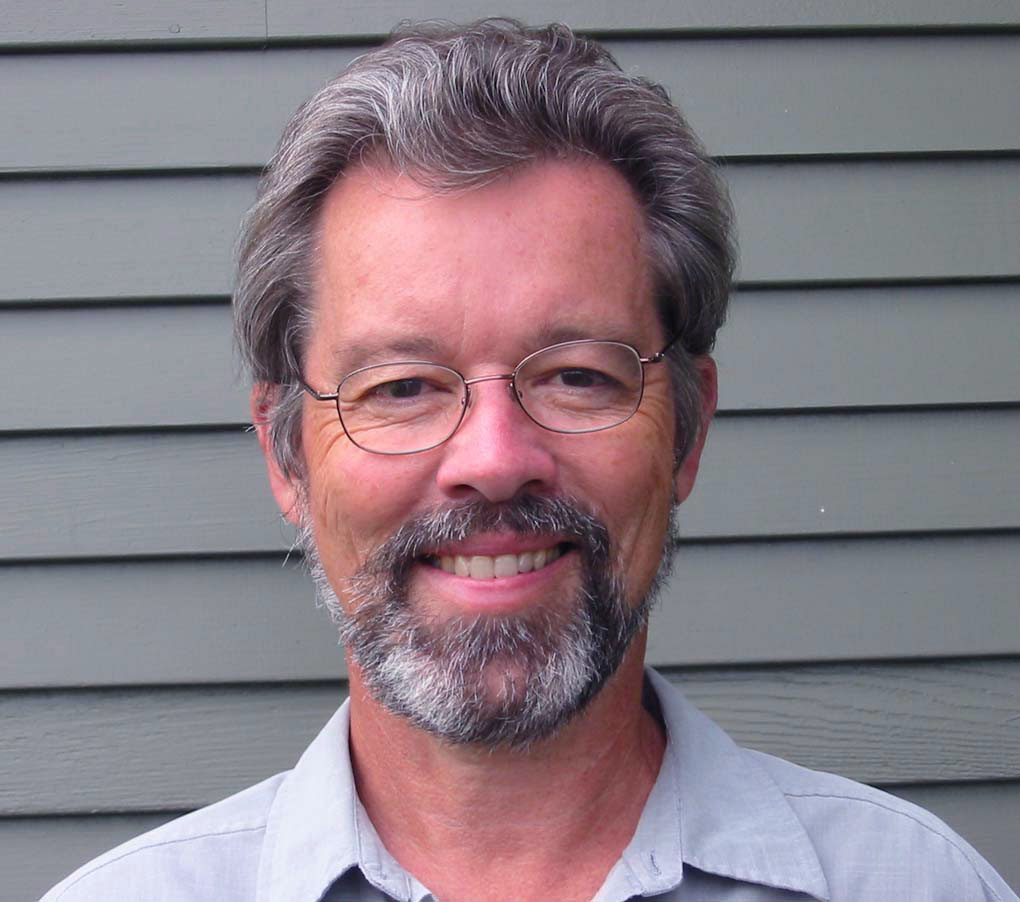
Greene in 2006

Mott T. Greene (born 1945) is an American historian of science, and is John B. Magee Professor of Science and Values Emeritus, at the University of Puget Sound, from which he retired in 2012. He is currently Affiliate Professor of Earth & Space Sciences at the University of Washington.

== Life ==
After attending the Storm King School in Cornwall-on-Hudson, N.Y. Greene attended Columbia College where he majored in Sociology and Asian Studies, and graduated in 1967. He then went on to graduate study in Japanese language and literature in the Department of East Asian Languages at Columbia. In August 1968 he married Abby Terris; they separated amicably in 1976 and divorced in 1977. While on a National Defense Education Act fellowship in 1968 to study Japanese at Columbia, Greene, an outspoken opponent of the Vietnam War, was drafted out of graduate school in November 1968. He refused induction into the US Army, and after registering and being certified as a conscientious objector served two years of alternative service at Columbia-Presbyterian Medical Center between 1969 and 1971. On release from alternative service he enrolled in the University of Washington graduate program in History, completing a PhD in 1978 in History of Science, with minor fields in European Intellectual History, History of Ancient Greece, and History of Japan. Later that year he married Josephine Leffingwell, a Seattle actress and mountaineering instructor. They have one daughter, Annie, born in 1983. Greene lectured at Oregon State University. He is a member of the History of Science Society.

== Awards ==
- 1983 MacArthur Fellows Program
- 1996 Carnegie Foundation Professor of the Year, Washington State
- 2016 Mary C. Rabbitt Award in the History and Philosophy of Geology, Geological Society of America
- 2017 Sue Tyler Friedman Medal of the Geological Society
- 2017 Named a Fellow of the Geological Society of America

== Works ==
- Alfred Wegener. Science, Exploration, and the Theory of Continental Drift Johns Hopkins University Press, 2015, ISBN 978-1-4214-1712-7
- Natural knowledge in preclassical antiquity Johns Hopkins University Press, 1992, ISBN 978-0-8018-4292-4
- Geology in the nineteenth century: changing views of a changing world, Cornell University Press, 1982, ISBN 978-0-8014-1467-1 Greene, Mott T. (15 January 2017). 2017 pbk reprint. Cornell University Press. ISBN 9781501704734.
