= Rhoda Rappaport =

American historian of science

- Born: August 10, 1935; Bronx, New York, U.S.
- Died: October 26, 2009 (aged 74)
- Occupations: Historian, college professor
- Honours: Sue Tyler Friedman Medal (2003)

Rhoda Rappaport (August 10, 1935 – October 26, 2009) was an American historian and college professor. She was a professor of history at Vassar College from 1961 to 2000, and specialized in the history of science, especially French histories of geology and chemistry. In 2003, she was the first woman awarded the Sue Tyler Friedman Medal.

== Biography ==
Rappaport was born in the Bronx, the daughter of Jack Rappaport and Esther Rappaport. Her parents were both immigrants from Central Europe. She attended Walton High School, and graduated from Goucher College in 1955. At Goucher she took a course from historian of science Dorothy Stimson. After college she studied with Pearl Kibre, before earning a master's degree from Cornell University in 1958, and completing doctoral studies there in 1964, with research in Paris and funding from the National Science Foundation and the AAUW. Her doctoral dissertation with advisor Henry Guerlac was about the Guettard-Lavoisier-Monnet mineralogical survey and atlas of France.

Rappaport was a professor of history at Vassar College from 1961 to 2000, and is recalled as the school's first historian of science. In 2003 she received the Sue Tyler Friedman Medal from the Geological Society of London. She died in 2009, at the age of 74. An edited collection of her essays was published in 2023 by Routledge.

== Publications ==
- "G.-F. Rouelle: An Eighteenth-Century Chemist and Teacher" (1960)
- "Rouelle and Stahl: The Phlogistic Revolution in France" (1961)
- "Antoine-Laurent Lavoisier: A Biographical Sketch (August 26, 1743—May 8, 1794)" (1963)
- "Problems and Sources in the History of Geology, 1749–1810" (1964)
- "Lavoisier's Geological Activities, 1763–1792" (1967)
- "Lavoisier's Theory of the Earth" (1973)
- "Geology and Orthodoxy: The Case of Noah's Flood in Eighteenth-Century Thought" (1978)
- "Borrowed Words: problems of vocabulary in eighteenth-century geology" (1982)
- When Geologists Were Historians (1997)
- Studies on Eighteenth-Century Geology (2023, essay collection published posthumously, edited by Kenneth L. Taylor)
