= Gordon Leslie Herries Davies =

British geographer

Gordon Leslie Herries Davies (born Gordon Leslie Davies; 18 January 1932 in Manchester – 22 February 2019 in North Uist, Scotland) was a British and Irish geographer, specializing in geomorphology, and a historian of geography and geology. He was the president of the Geographical Society of Ireland from 1962 to 1964.

== Biography ==
As a child at the beginning of WW II, he was evacuated to Blackpool, but returned to Manchester after a brief time. G. L. Davies matriculated in 1949 to read geography at the University of Manchester. There, he graduated in 1953 with an M.A. and a thesis on geomorphology in North Wales. In October 1954 he joined the academic staff of Trinity College Dublin (TCD). In TCD's department of geography, he was an Assistant Lecturer from 1954 to 1957, a Lecturer from 1957 to 1970, and an Associate Professor from 1970 to 1989, when he when retired with emeritus status. In 1967 he was elected to Fellowship of TCD. At TCD he received a second M.A. jure officii on the basis of his academic standing. On sabbatical leave in Oregon, he completed his first book, Earth in Decay (1969), which earned him a Ph.D. from TCD. The book deals with the history of British geomorphology before 1878.

In 1977 Gordon Leslie Davies changed his name to "Gordon Leslie Herries Davies" — "Herries" was his mother's surname before her marriage. The reason for the name change was that K. Gordon Davies (1923–1994) was appointed in 1977 to the Erasmus Smith Chair of Modern History at TCD.

In November 1980, Davies gave the Ramsbottom Lecture to the Society for the History of Natural History. The lecture entitled The Mapping of Natural Phenomena in 19th Century Ireland was expanded into his 1983 book Sheets of Many Colours.

At TCD he served as a College Tutor for a number of years and, later in his career, as a Senior Proctor. He served as editor of the journal Irish Geography from 1968 to 1978 and edited the journal's supplementary volume celebrating its golden jubilee year in 1984. In retirement, Herries Davies expended considerable effort as one of the editors of The Dictionary of Irish Biography.

Herries Davies wrote numerous articles published in learned journals and also wrote several important books. He was an excellent writer with a clear expository style. His book The earth in decay (1969) is a significant work in the history of geomorphology. Sheets of many colours (1983) describes Irish geological mapping. North from the Hook (1995) gives a history of the Geological Survey of Ireland. In his 1995 book, he emphasizes that collecting fossils was always a "high priority" for the Geological Survey of Ireland. Whatever is under the Earth (2007) tells the history of the Geological Society of London from 1807 to 2007. In 1978, he published an overview of research on Earth sciences in 23 Irish serial publications from 1787 to 1977.

Herries Davies was elected in 1979 as a member of the Royal Irish Academy. He was honoured with the Sue Tyler Friedman Medal of the Geological Society of London in 1996, the History of Geology Award of the Geological Society of America in 1997, and the Founder’s Medal of the Society for the History of Natural History in 2000.

Desmond Alfred Gillmor, an emeritus professor at TCD, gave, in a 2019 memorial tribute, a description of the geographical work of Herries Davies.

In 1956 he married Kathleen Mary Fryer in Chester. They had two sons.

== Selected publications ==
=== Articles ===
- Davies, G. L. (1956). "The Parish of North Uist". The Scottish Geographical Magazine. 72 (2): 65–80. doi:10.1080/00369225608735636.
- Davies, Gordon L. (1962). "Joseph Beete Jukes and the rivers of southern Ireland—a century's retrospect". Irish Geography. 4 (4): 221–233. doi:10.1080/00750776209555550.
- Davies, Gordon L. (1964). "Robert Hooke and his conception of Earth-History". Proceedings of the Geologists' Association. 75 (4): 493–498. doi:10.1016/S0016-7878(64)80024-9.
- Davies, Gordon L. (1966). "Early British Geomorphology 1578-1705". The Geographical Journal. 132 (2): 252–262. doi:10.2307/1792340. JSTOR 1792340.
- Davies, Gordon L. (1966). "The Concept of Denudation in Seventeenth-Century England". Journal of the History of Ideas. 27 (2): 278–284. doi:10.2307/2708644. JSTOR 2708644.
- Davies, G. L. (1969). "The University of Dublin and two pioneers of English geology". Hermathena. 109: 24–36. JSTOR 23040157.
- Davies, Gordon L. (1970). "Twenty-seven years of Irish geography". Irish Geography. 6 (2): 186–193. doi:10.1080/00750777009555658.
- Davies, Gordon L. (1977). "The Making of Irish Geography, II: Grenville Arthur James Cole". Irish Geography. 10: 90–94. doi:10.1080/00750777709478931.
- Herries Davies, Gordon L. (1978). "The Earth Sciences in Irish Serial Publications 1787-1977". Journal of Earth Sciences. 1 (1): 1–23. JSTOR 30002108.
- Herries Davies, Gordon L. (1979). "The making of Irish geography, IV: The physico-historical society of Ireland, 1744–1752". Irish Geography. 12: 92–98. doi:10.1080/00750777909555746.
- Archer, Jean B.; Herries Davies, Gordon L. (1981). "Geological Field-Sheets from County Galway by Patrick Ganly (1809?-1899)". Journal of Earth Sciences. 4 (2): 167–179. JSTOR 30002363.
- Herries Davies, Gordon L. (1983). "Field Evidence in the Earth Sciences". Irish Geography. 16: 95–107. doi:10.1080/00750778309478874.
- Archer, Jean Barbara; Davies, Gordon Leslie Herries (2000). "Inspiration from Nature and some plays written by John O'Keeffe (1747–1833)". Archives of Natural History. 27: 123–135. doi:10.3366/anh.2000.27.1.123.
- Herries Davies, Gordon L. (2004). "Our first sixty years: One editor remembers". Irish Geography. 37: 6–14. doi:10.1080/00750770409555825.
- Herries Davies, Gordon L. (2009). "Jacques-Louis, Comte de Bournon". Geological Society, London, Special Publications. 317 (1): 105–113. Bibcode:2009GSLSP.317..105H. doi:10.1144/sp317.4. S2CID 219194608.
- Davies, Gordon L. Herries (2011). "The Chalk Outlier at Ballydeenlea, Co. Kerry; A Story of Discovery". Irish Journal of Earth Sciences. 29 (1): 27–38. doi:10.1353/ijes.2011.0002.
- Tinkler, K. J., ed. (11 May 2020). "Chapter 1. On the nature of geo-history, with reflections on the historiography of geomorphology by Gordon L. Herries Davies". The History of Geomorphology. Routledge. pp. 1–10. ISBN 9781000045789.

=== Books ===
- Herries Davies, G. L. (1969). The Earth in Decay: a history of British geomorphology 1578–1878. Macdonald and Co., London; Elsevier, New York. LCCN 77415308.
- Herries Davies, G. L.; Stephens, Nicholas (1978). Ireland. London: Methuen. ISBN 0416846408. LCCN 79308541; with contributions on the Pleistocene history from Francis M. Synge
- Herries Davies, Gordon L. (1983). Sheets of many colours: the mapping of Ireland's rocks, 1750-1890. Dublin: Royal Dublin Society. ISBN 0-86027-014-9. LCCN 83230633.
- G.L. Herries Davies G. L.; Orme, Antony R. (1989). Two centuries of earth science, 1650-1850: papers presented at a Clark Library seminar, 3 November 1984. Los Angeles: William Andrews Clark Memorial Library, University of California, Los Angeles. LCCN 89008877.
- Davies, Gordon L. Herries, ed. (1984). Irish geography: the Geographical Society of Ireland golden jubilee, 1934-1984. Dublin: Geographical Society of Ireland. LCCN 90143937.
- Herries Davies, Gordon Leslie (1995). North from the Hook: 150 years of the Geological Survey of Ireland. Dublin: Geological Survey of Ireland. ISBN 1899702008.
- Herries Davies, G. L. (2007). Whatever is Under the Earth the Geological Society of London 1807-2007. ISBN 9781862392144. LCCN 2007276571; foreword by Richard Forley
