= Sidney Powers Memorial Award =

The Sidney Powers Memorial Award is a gold medal awarded by the American Association of Petroleum Geologists in recognition of distinguished and outstanding contributions to, or achievements in, petroleum geology. The award is named after Sidney Powers.

== Recipients ==
Source: AAPG

- 1945 Wallace E. Pratt
- 1947 Alexander Deussen
- 1948 Arville Irving Levorsen
- 1950 Everette Lee DeGolyer
- 1951 Max Steineke
- 1952 Kenneth Conrad Heald
- 1953 Frederic H. Lahee
- 1954 George Martin Lees
- 1956 William Embry Wrather
- 1957 Joseph Poyer Deyo Hull
- 1958 Paul Weaver
- 1959 Raymond C. Moore
- 1960 Henry V. Howe
- 1961 Clarence L. Moody
- 1962 Lewis G. Weeks
- 1963 Hollis Dow Hedberg
- 1964 Edgar W. Owen
- 1965 Victor Elvert Monnett
- 1966 William B. Heroy, Sr.
- 1967 Carey Croneis
- 1968 Maurice Ewing
- 1969 Ira H. Cram, Sr.
- 1970 Frank R. Clark
- 1971 Frank A. Morgan
- 1972 Morgan J. Davis, Sr.
- 1973 Gordon I. Atwater
- 1974 G. Moses Knebel
- 1975 Dean A. McGee
- 1976 W. Dow Hamm
- 1977 Michel T. Halbouty
- 1978 Kenneth H. Crandall
- 1979 William Hirst Curry, Jr.
- 1980 Kenneth K. Landes
- 1981 Mason L. Hill
- 1982 Daniel A. Busch
- 1983 Grover E. Murray
- 1984 Robert J. Weimer
- 1985 J. Ben Carsey
- 1986 Merrill W. Haas
- 1987 James E. Wilson
- 1988 Rufus J. LeBlanc, Sr.
- 1989 Hugh Neumann Frenzel
- 1990 John T. Galey
- 1991 John E. Kilkenny
- 1992 Sherman A. Wengerd
- 1993 Robert R. Berg
- 1994 William L. Fisher
- 1995 John D. Haun
- 1996 Bernold M. Hanson
- 1997 Robert D. Gunn
- 1998 Albert W. Bally
- 1999 Norman H. Foster
- 2000 Gerald M. Friedman
- 2001 Robert M. Sneider
- 2002 James L. Wilson
- 2003 Peter R. Vail
- 2004 Lawrence W. Funkhouser
- 2005 Kenneth W. Glennie
- 2006 Robert M. Mitchum, Jr.
- 2007 Arnold H. Bouma
- 2008 Fred F. Meissner
- 2009 Marlan W. Downey
- 2010 L. Frank Brown, Jr.
- 2011 John W. Shelton
- 2012 Koenraad J. Weber
- 2013 Dietrich Welte
- 2014 Ernest A. Mancini
- 2015 Paul Mitchell Harris
- 2016 Paul Edwin Potter
- 2017 Lawrence Daniel Meckel
- 2018 Mike C. Forrest
- 2019 Kenneth Eric Peters

== See also ==
- List of geology awards
