= William Embry Wrather =

American geologist (1883–1963)

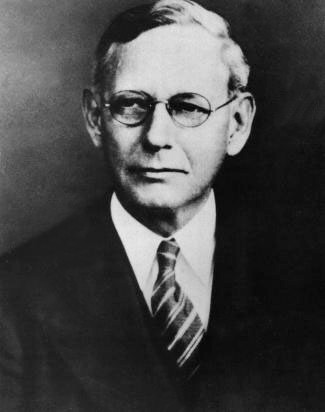

6th Director of the U.S. Geological Survey
- In office 1943 – 1956
- Preceded by: Walter Curran Mendenhall
- Succeeded by: Thomas Brennan Nolan

Personal details
- Born: January 20, 1883 Brandenburg, Kentucky, U.S.
- Died: November 28, 1963 (aged 80) Washington, D.C., U.S.
- Education: University of Chicago (PhB)
- Employer: U.S. Geological Survey
- Known for: Geology ( petroleum geology; economic geology ); Administration ( AAPG; TSHA; SEG; USGS; AIME )

William Embry Wrather (January 20, 1883 – November 28, 1963) was an American petroleum and economic geologist who served in various administrative roles including as the sixth director of the U.S. Geological Survey (USGS). He was awarded the John Fritz Medal in 1954.

== Personal life and education ==
William Embry Wrather was born on January 20, 1883, on a farm near Brandenburg in Meade County, Kentucky. He was the only son of Glovy Washington Wrather (née Munford) and Richard Anslem Wrather. In 1898, William moved to Chicago, Illinois, where he attended South Chicago High School, lived with his uncle, and worked at his grocery store. William began studying law at the University of Chicago in 1903, though professor Rollin D. Salisbury encouraged him to pursue science. Wrather graduated with a Bachelor of Philosophy degree c. 1907 or 1908. In 1910, he married Alice Mildred Dolling, whom he had met in college. The couple had four children, of which two survived to adulthood.

Wrather died on November 28, 1963, at his home in Washington, D.C.

== Career ==
In the summer of 1907, Wrather served as a field assistant to Frank C. Calkins, geologist of the U.S. Geological Survey, for research in mountainous western Montana. Prior to starting in this position, Calkins had sent Wrather a letter that "[specified] the conditions of his employment and [warned] that the work was rigorous and no nonsense would be tolerated."

Wrather also explored other opportunities soon after his graduation. Professor Salisbury had encouraged him to become a geology professor, but the pay was not attractive. Wrather personally wished to return to the USGS, but alas there were no appealing opportunities. Because the automotive industry was flourishing, jobs opened up in the petroleum business. Wrather moved to Muskogee, Oklahoma and did clerical work, but soon found a job as a scout for the Beaumont, Texas–based J. M. Guffey Petroleum Company (later to become part of Gulf Oil). He resigned in 1916 to pursue further opportunities, which included starting a petroleum geology consulting firm in Dallas. In 1918, Wrather suggested to a client that drilling be commenced at Desdemona in Comanche County, Texas. The well proved successful, and Wrather received $750 thousand for his contributions to the discovery.

Wrather was a founding member of the American Association of Petroleum Geologists, and served as the association's secretary-treasurer in 1918 and president in 1922. He became a fellow of the Geological Society of America in 1923, and served as the society's vice president in 1936. He was also president of the Society of Economic Geologists in 1934, and of the Texas State Historical Association for seven years in the 1930s. During this time period, Wrather held additional roles in the American Academy of Arts and Sciences (treasurer, 1941–1943) and the American Association for the Advancement of Science (elected fellow 1925; treasurer, 1941–1945).

Upon the retirement of Walter Curran Mendenhall in 1943, the U.S. Geological Survey was looking for a new director. The National Academy of Sciences recommended Wrather to the position, and he was brought in as director of the U.S. Geological Survey. At the time, he was the only director other than Clarence King (the first director) who had been appointed to the position while not employed by the agency. In 1948, while still director of the USGS, Wrather served as president of the American Institute of Mining Engineers. Thomas Brennan Nolan succeeded Wrather as USGS director in 1956.

While director in 1948, when Calkins' retirement age came, Wrather summoned him to his office and reminded him of the letter he had written when Wrather was only his assistant. This highlights the enduring relationship that Wrather and Calkins had during their respective careers.

=== Professional service and memberships ===
- 1918: Secretary-treasurer, American Association of Petroleum Geologists
- 1921: President, American Association of Petroleum Geologists
- 1923: Fellow, Geological Society of America
- 1925: Fellow, American Association for the Advancement of Science
- 1932–1939: President, Texas State Historical Association
- 1934: President, Society of Economic Geologists
- 1936: Vice-president, Geological Society of America
- 1941–1943: Treasurer, American Academy of Arts and Sciences
- 1941–1945: Treasurer, American Association for the Advancement of Science
- 1943–1956: Director, U.S. Geological Survey
- 1948: President, American Institute of Mining Engineers

Lines in italics indicate election to a society.

== Awards and honors ==
- 1941: Alumni Medal, University of Chicago
- 1945: Honorary Doctor of Science, Southern Methodist University
- 1947: Honorary Degree, Colorado School of Mines
- 1950: Honorary Doctor of Science, University of Kentucky
- 1952: Honorary Doctor of Science, Montana School of Mines
- 1954: John Fritz Medal, John Fritz Medal Board
- 1956: Sidney Powers Memorial Award, American Association of Petroleum Geologists
- 1950: Anthony F. Lucas Gold Medal, American Institute of Mining Engineers
- 1960: Honorary Membership, American Institute of Mining Engineers
