= Frank C. Calkins =

American geologist (1878–1974)

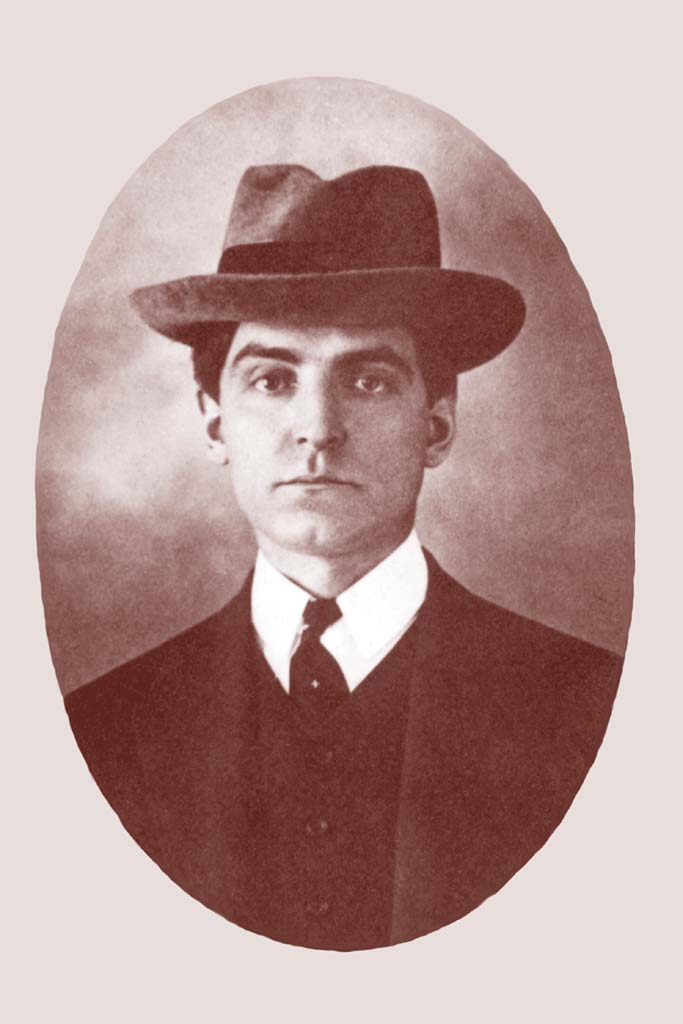
Calkins in 1901

Frank Cathcart Calkins (June 7, 1878 – December 31, 1974) was an American geologist, petrologist, and mapper of the U.S. Geological Survey known for his work on the geology of Yosemite National Park.

Calkins was born in East Rockport in Cuyahoga County, Ohio on June 7, 1878, the oldest of Caroline Cathcart Calkins and Carlos Gilman Calkins' 5 children. Carlos Calkins was a graduate of the Naval Academy, and the family moved to Europe when Frank was 9 months old. Frank gained a native level of fluency in French while there. In 1895, Carlos Calkins was in charge of a hydrographic office in Portland, Oregon, and Frank enrolled in the University of California, graduating in 1899. That same year, Calkins traveled with John C. Merriam to the John Day basin in Oregon. The pair collected samples of fossils and rocks, which became the basis of Calkins' first paper in 1902.

Calkins joined the U.S. Geological Survey in 1900 as an assistant to George Otis Smith, who would later become the agency's director. The pair completed multiple geological studies in Washington state from 1900 to 1902. Calkins also studied the geology near Coeur d'Alene, Idaho in 1903, and began geological mapping of Yosemite Valley in 1913. He completed field work from 1913 to 1916, but never published a map during his life. Much of his research in Yosemite was done in collaboration with François E. Matthes, and their collaboration was "the first detailed program of research on the geology of the park and the origin of Yosemite Valley," according to Dallas Peck. Matthes' Geologic History of the Yosemite Valley was published in 1930, and contained petrologic studies conducted by Calkins as well as glacial and geomorphologic surveys by Matthes. One other contribution by Calkins to the field of geology is devising the current decimal system of plagioclase notation.

During his career, Calkins also served as a scientific editor, often revising his colleagues' writings to improve their clarity. He "had a penchant for improving the writing of others," according Suggestions to Authors, a style guide for U.S. Geological Survey publications. He was described as a "grammarian-geologist", and his writing advice is published in the guide.

Calkins worked for the U.S. Geological Survey from their office in Menlo Park, California. When he reached 70 years old, the agency's mandatory retirement age, he received a dispensation and continued to work as an annuitant. He died on December 31, 1974, at the Stanford University hospital; he was 97 years old. Calkins had retired from the Geological Survey only five years prior, and was living in Palo Alto, California at the time of his death.

== Sources ==
- Communications and Publishing (April 13, 2016). "Yosemite Science". U.S. Geological Survey.
- Crittenden, Max D. Jr. (February 1977). "Memorial to Frank Cathcart Calkins" (PDF). Memorials. 6. Geological Society of America.
- Hansen, Wallace R. (1991). Suggestions to Authors of the Reports of the United States Geological Survey (Seventh ed.). U.S. Government Printing Office. doi:10.3133/7000088.
- "Leading geologist Frank Calkins dies". Palo Alto Times. 83 (3): 15. January 3, 1975 – via Newspapers.com.
- Matthes, François E. (1930). Geologic History of the Yosemite Valley. Geological Survey Professional Paper 160. U.S. Department of the Interior. doi:10.3133/pp160.
- McCarthy, Guy (November 7, 2022). "New research indicates the famous Yosemite Valley landscape isn't as old as previously believed". The Union Democrat.
