= Marvin (crater) =

Lunar impact crater

Marvin is a lunar impact crater that lies near the south pole of the Moon. The rim of the crater is approximately 16 miles from the pole. The area near the crater was projected to be the site of future exploration by Artemis III astronauts, a mission that has now changed to low Earth orbit.

The crater is named after pioneering planetary geologist Ursula Marvin.
