= Ursula Marvin =

American geologist, mineralogist and historian of science

Ursula B. Marvin
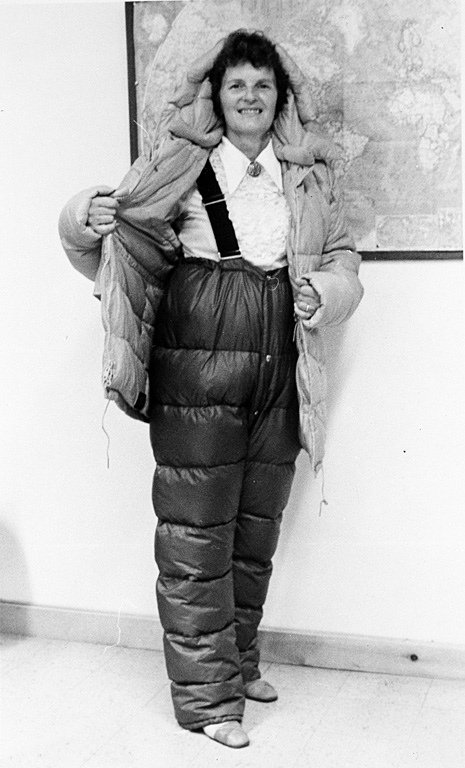
- Marvin in 1978
- Born: Ursula Bailey; August 20, 1921; Bradford, Vermont, U.S.
- Died: February 12, 2018 (aged 96); Concord, Massachusetts, U.S.
- Education: Tufts University, Harvard University-Radcliffe
- Known for: Continental Drift: Evolution of a Concept
- Spouse: Thomas Crockett Marvin
- Awards: Lifetime Achievement Award from Women in Science and Engineering
- Scientific career
- Fields: Planetary geology
- Institutions: Smithsonian Astrophysical Observatory

Ursula Bailey Marvin (August 20, 1921 – February 12, 2018) was an American planetary geologist and author who worked for the Smithsonian Astrophysical Observatory.

She won the 1997 Women in Science and Engineering Lifetime Achievement Award. In 1986, the Geological Society of America awarded her their History of Geology Award. She also won the 2005 Sue Tyler Friedman Medal, and Antarctica's Marvin Nunatak is named in her honor. In 2012, the Meteoritical Society awarded her the Service Award in part for her work recording the oral history of meteoriticists. Asteroid (4309) Marvin is named in her honour, as is Marvin Crater on the Moon, located near the Lunar south pole.

== Early life and education ==
Ursula Bailey was born in Bradford, Vermont, on August 20, 1921, to Harold Leslie Bailey and Alice M. Bailey. Her childhood near the White Mountains of New Hampshire, where, as she recalled in 1997, sunsets "shone with a pink-purple afterglow," inspired her with a love of the outdoors, but did not, at first, spark an interest in geology. While studying history at Tufts University, she took a geology class to fulfill her science requirements and was taken by the subject. She asked her geology professor to change majors to geology, but he refused (he told her she should learn how to cook) so she added geology, math and physics courses to her schedule. She graduated with a bachelor's degree in history from Tufts University in 1943. She then attended Harvard University-Radcliffe, earning a master's degree in geology in 1946.

== Career and research ==
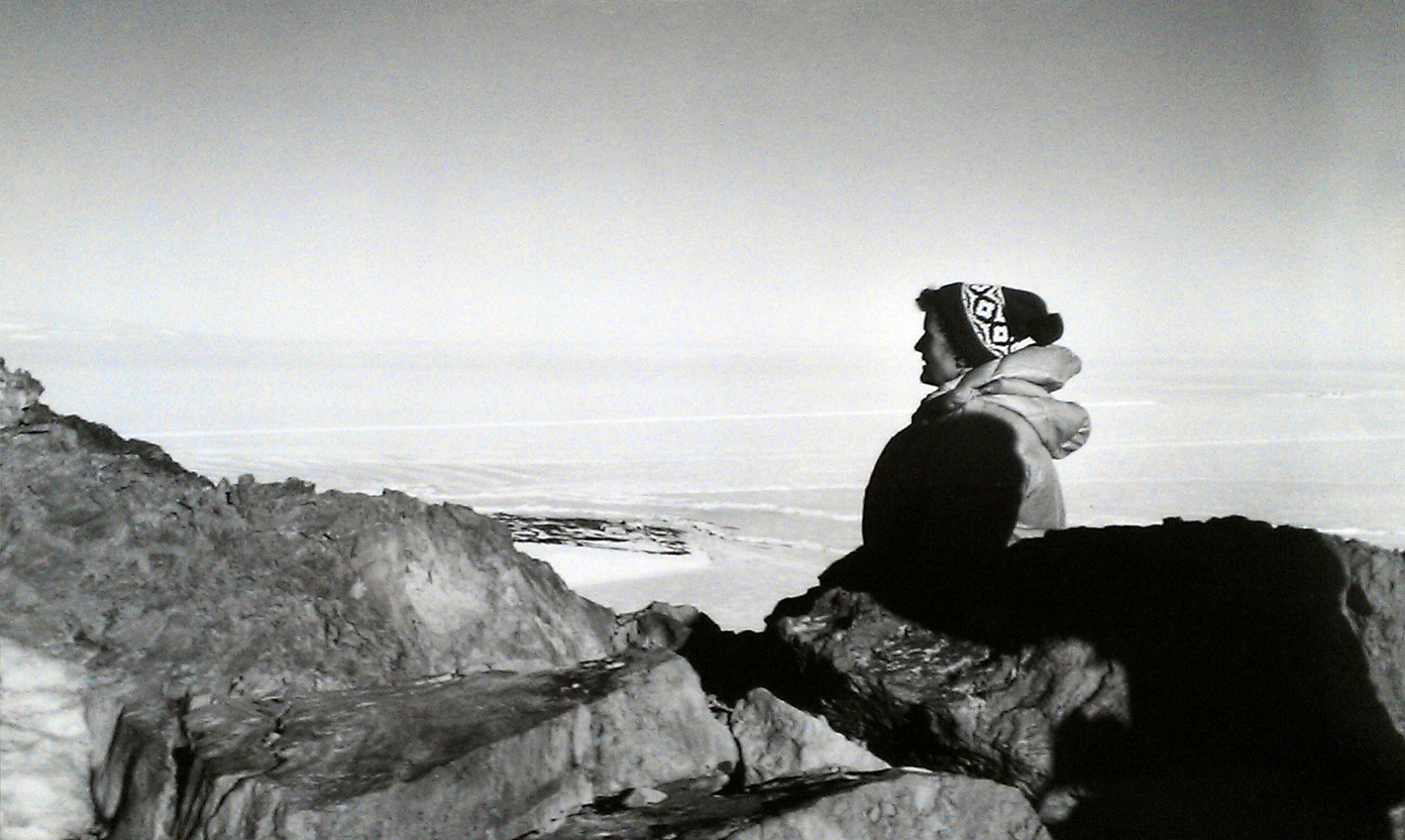
Ursula B. Marvin in Antarctica

Following World War II, she moved to Chicago, where she was a research associate at the University of Chicago, working with Julian Goldsmith. She was briefly married to Lloyd Chaisson, a dental student at the University of Chicago.

She then returned to Harvard, to work on her Ph.D. in geology. While at Harvard she worked alongside her second husband, Thomas Crockett Marvin (June 28, 1916 – July 1, 2012), whom she married in 1952. They prospected for ore deposits in Brazil and Angola starting in 1953. After returning to the United States in 1958, she taught mineralogy at Tufts for two years before she was offered a job researching meteorites at Harvard. She was appointed to a permanent research staff position at the Smithsonian Astrophysical Observatory in 1961 and received a Ph.D. in geology from Harvard in 1969.

She authored the 1973 book Continental Drift: Evolution of a Concept and authored over 160 research papers. Her key contributions in planetary science concentrated on studies of meteorites and lunar samples. Her publications include analysis of oxidation products of Sputnik 4 to determine mineralogical alteration over exposure time with applications to iron meteorites. She was also involved with numerous studies of returned samples from both the American and Russian lunar programs, including from the Apollo 12, Apollo 15, Apollo 16 missions, and from Luna 16 and Luna 20.

She traveled to Antarctica for three of the early ANSMET surveys and analyzed the first lunar meteorite, Allan Hills A81005. She was the first woman on the American team that conducted research there. Because of her contributions to research in Antarctica, a small mountain on the ice sheet was named for her, Marvin Nunatak.

She served as a trustee at Tufts University from 1975 to 1985, and was an emerita trustee of the university.

== Awards and honors ==
- 1997, Lifetime Achievement Award from Women in Science and Engineering.
- 1986, History of Geology Award, Geological Society of America
- 2005, Sue Tyler Friedman Medal
- 2012, Service Award, the Meteoritical Society
- Antarctica's Marvin Nunatak is named in her honor.
- Asteroid (4309) Marvin is named in her honor.
- Marvin Crater, located near the south pole of the Moon, is named in her honor.
