= Thomas Brennan Nolan =

American geologist (1901–1992)

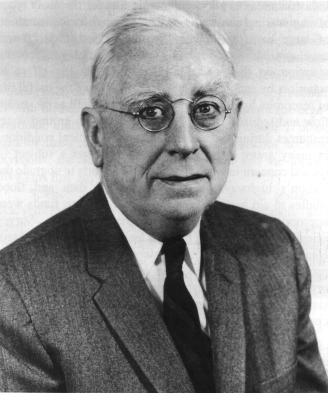
- Nolan as Director of USGS

7th Director of the United States Geological Survey
- In office 1956 – 1965
- Preceded by: William Embry Wrather
- Succeeded by: William Thomas Pecora

Personal details
- Born: May 21, 1901 Greenfield, Massachusetts
- Died: August 2, 1992 (aged 91) Washington, DC, USA
- Scientific career
- Education: Yale University
- Fields: Petrography, Geology
- Workplaces: US Geological Survey
- Thesis: Geology of the northwest portion of the Spring Mountains, Nevada (1924)

Thomas Brennan Nolan (May 21, 1901 – August 2, 1992) was an American geologist who was the seventh director of the United States Geological Survey (USGS) from 1956 to 1965. The mineral nolanite is named in his honor and he was an elected member of the American Academy of Arts and Sciences, the United States National Academy of Sciences, and the American Philosophical Society. He was generally known as Tom Nolan.

== Early life ==
Nolan was born in Greenfield, Massachusetts in 1901.

He was educated at New Haven, Connecticut, then studied Metallurgy at Yale University, graduating with a BS in 1921. He continued studying at Yale and received a PhD in Geology in 1924. After training for the Civil Service he joined the US Geological Survey,

== USGS career ==
After Director William Embry Wrather retired because of illness and age in 1955, Assistant Director Thomas B. Nolan became the 's (USGS) seventh director in January 1956. During his 11 years as an Assistant Director, Nolan had many times and for extended periods served as an Acting Director so no transition period was needed. Nolan believed that geologists, because of the unique requirements imposed on them by their science, should expand their fields of interest from individual problems and "participate actively and authoritatively in the matters affecting the whole country." Until September 1965, when he resumed his research in Great Basin geology, Nolan pushed, prodded, and led the Survey to a broadened and intensified commitment to basic research, to the advancement of geology in the public service, and to the prompt publication of Survey results. As Assistant Director, he had also served as the Interior Department representative on the Interdepartmental Committee on Scientific Research and Development, on the Scientific Advisory Committee on Specialized Personnel to the Selective Service Committee, and on the Advisory Board on Education of the National Academy of Sciences, and had been president of the Society of Economic Geologists and the Geological Society of America (1961).

As Director, his professional responsibilities outside the Survey were still further extended to service as vice president and president of the Geological Society of America, as vice president of the International Union of Geological Sciences, and on committees advisory to university geology departments. In 1956, the Geological Survey began an evaluation of the effects of underground nuclear explosions at the Atomic Energy Commission's Nevada Test Site; that program was expanded to study the geologic and hydrologic conditions affecting the peaceful uses of atomic energy and the disposal of radioactive wastes.

In December 1958, Director Nolan, speaking at the meeting of the American Association for the Advancement of Science, remarked that the early work of the Geological Survey had been characterized by a transition from exploration of a geographical to an intellectual frontier, but demands by younger scientists for studies of the geography of outer space might soon inaugurate a new cycle in the history of the US Geological Survey.

In 1959, the Survey compiled a photogeologic map of the Earth's satellite, the Moon, and began studies of tektites and impact craters. On May 25, 1961, President John F. Kennedy proposed as a goal "landing a man on the moon and returning him safely to earth" before the end of the decade, and in 1963, the US Geological Survey, in cooperation with the National Aeronautics and Space Administration, began to train astronauts in geology and to investigate and evaluate methods and equipment for geological and geophysical exploration of the Moon.

He died in Washington, D.C., on August 2, 1992.

== Family ==
He was married to Mabel ("Pete") Orleman (d.1983). They had one son.

== Publications ==
- Nolan, Thomas B. "Late Paleozoic positive area in Nevada". American Journal of Science, vol.16, no.92, pp. 153–161, Aug 1928
- Nolan, T B. "Potash brines in the Great Salt Lake Desert, Utah". USGS Bulletin 0795-B, pp. 25–44, 1928
- Nolan, Thomas B. "Report on El Guineo and Matrullas dam sites, Toro Negro Project, Porto Rico". USGS Open-File Report No. 559 (1928)
- Nolan, Thomas B. "Gold Hill mining district, Utah", USGS Professional Paper No. 177 (1935)
- Nolan, Thomas Brennan and Johnston, W.D. Jr. "Methods of constructing block diagrams for use in mining geology". Economic Geology and the Bulletin of the Society of Economic Geologists, vol. 32, no. 2, pp. 194–195, Mar 1937
- Nolan, Thomas Brennan. "The Basin and Range province in Utah, Nevada, and California". USGS Professional Paper 197-D. (1942).
- Nolan, Thomas Brennan "The search for new mining districts". Economic Geology and the Bulletin of the Society of Economic Geologists, vol.45, no.7, pp. 601–608, Nov 1950
- Nolan, Thomas B. Merriam, C.W., Williams, J.S. "Stratigraphic section in the vicinity of Eureka, Nevada". USGS Professional Paper No. 276 (1956)
- Miesch, Alfred T. and Nolan, Thomas B. "Geochemical prospecting studies in the Bullwhacker mine area, Eureka district, Nevada". USGS Bulletin 1000-H (1958)
- Nolan, Thomas Brennan. "The place of geology in the development of the mining industry". Mines Magazine, vol.50, no.2, pp. 20–22, 1960
- Nolan, Thomas B. "The Eureka mining district, Nevada". USGS Professional Paper No. 406 (1962)

== Additional sources ==
- Thomas Brennan Nolan bio. U.S. Geological Survey, U.S. Department of the Interior
- Robinson, S.C., Evans, H.T., Jr., Schaller, W.T. and Fahey, J.J. (1957) Nolanite, a new iron-vanadium mineral from Beaverlodge, Saskatchewan. American Mineralogist, 42, 619–628.
- Stewart, David B. "Memorial of Thomas Brennan Nolan, 1901–1992". American Mineralogist, vol. 79, no. 5–6, pp. 575–576, Jun 1994

Government offices
Preceded by William Embry Wrather	Director of the United States Geological Survey; 1956–1965	Succeeded by William Thomas Pecora
