= Gerald M. Friedman =

American geologist (1921–2011)

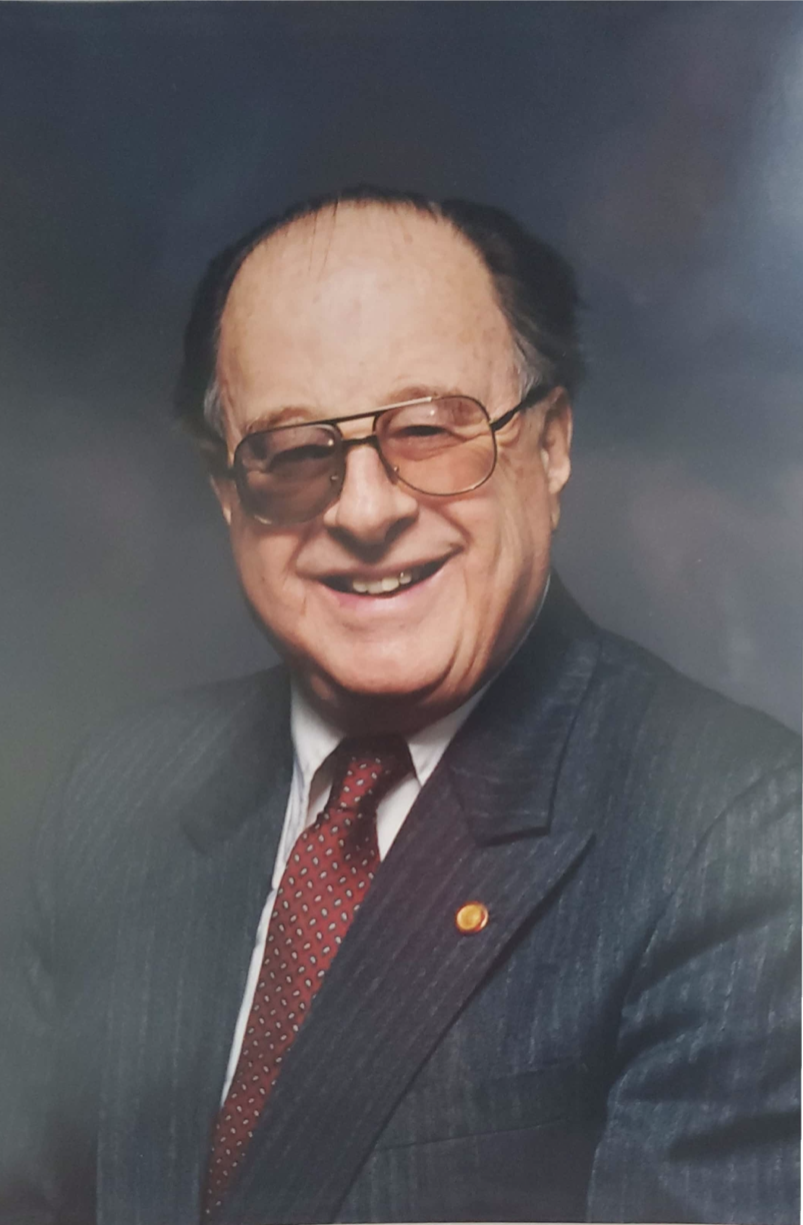
- Born: July 23, 1921; Berlin, Germany
- Died: November 29, 2011 (age 90)
- Education: Columbia University
- Known for: Sedimentology
- Spouse: Sue (Tyler) Friedman
- Awards: William H. Twenhofel Medal and Sidney Powers Memorial Award
- Scientific career
- Workplaces: Rensselaer Polytechnic Institute; CUNY Graduate Center; Brooklyn College

Gerald M. Friedman (1921–2011) was a distinguished professor in Geology and was one of the founders of modern rock sedimentation. Friedman was a professor in Rensselaer Polytechnic Institute, the Graduate Center of the City University of New York and Brooklyn College.

== Life ==
Friedman was born in Berlin, Germany, on July 27, 1921. Being a Jew, Friedman escaped the Nazis in 1938 to England. Friedman completed a bachelor's degree in the University of London in the year 1945, with chemistry as the major and geology as a minor. In the year 1945 Friedman immigrated to the United States and worked three years as a Chemist in Squibb.

== Scientific contributions ==
Friedman published 573 papers and 19 books, including the highly cited book "Principles of Sedimentology". Friedman received numerous awards including the prestige William H. Twenhofel Medal (in 1997), the Sidney Powers Memorial Award (in 2000), and the Mary C. Rabbitt History And Philosophy of Geology Award (in 2005). Friedman was the founder and director of the Northeastern Science Foundation which hosts symposia and publishes several journals, including Northeastern Geology, Environmental Science, and Carbonates and Evaporites, as well as the Carbonates and Evaporites journal.

The Sue Tyler Friedman Medal was named after Friedman's wife, Sue (Tyler) Friedman.
