= Gerald Friedman (economist) =

- Born: July 10, 1955 (age 71)

Academic background
- Education: Harvard University; Columbia University

Gerald Carl Friedman (born July 10, 1955) is an economics professor at the University of Massachusetts at Amherst. He became nationally prominent during the 2016 U.S. presidential election after writing an analysis of Democratic Party candidate Bernie Sanders campaign's policies in which Friedman concluded that these policies would produce significant economic growth in the United States (including 5.3% annual growth in real GDP) if they were enacted. Friedman also received strong backlash for these remarks, from editorial pundits and fellow academics.

== Biography ==
Gerald Friedman earned his bachelor's degree in economics and history from Columbia University in 1977. Later, he went on to obtain his Ph.D. in economics from Harvard University in 1986, with his dissertation titled, "Politics and Unions: Government, Ideology, and the Labor Movement in the United States and France, 1880-1914."

== 2016 Election ==
=== Report on Sanders's policies ===
In early February, an article was published on CNN Money that described the Sanders platform as boosting income and jobs. This article was based on the research performed by Gerald Friedman. The article sparked debate among economists and political pundits alike in the aftermath.

==== Criticism ====
Friedman received criticism from four former Chairs of the Council of Economic Advisers under both Presidents Clinton and Obama. Their open letter ends with the following quote:

As much as we wish it were so, no credible economic research supports economic impacts of these magnitudes. Making such promises runs against our party’s best traditions of evidence-based policy making and undermines our reputation as the party of responsible arithmetic. These claims undermine the credibility of the progressive economic agenda and make it that much more difficult to challenge the unrealistic claims made by Republican candidates.

According to a report in the Washington Post, the letter from the four former Chairs of The Council of Economic Advisers included an accusation that Professor Friedman was affiliated with the Sanders campaign. Later, Friedman revealed that he was in fact a supporter of Sanders's only opponent in the 2016 Democratic primaries, Hillary Clinton.

In describing Friedman's economic analysis, Paul Krugman, a trade economist and laureate of the Nobel Prize in Economic Sciences, has written, "Sorry, but there’s just no way to justify this stuff. For wonks like me, it is, frankly, horrifying." Krugman criticized the GDP growth projection, and claimed that the projection of the US employment-population ratio is unrealistic given population aging.

A critique by Christina Romer and David Romer argued that Friedman's analysis relied on incorrect estimates of the effects on aggregate demand, is in conflict with the plausible size of the US output gap, and that Sanders's policies would have a small, or negative, effect on productivity.

==== Support ====
Dean Baker, lead economist from the Center for Economic and Policy Research, agreed that the findings by Gerald Friedman were on the extreme side of possibility, he noted that the four economists from the CEA were blindsided by many economic disasters in the past decades and relied too heavily on their credentials without substantiating why they did not support Gerald Friedman's economic findings on Sanders's policies. In a separate post, Baker criticized Krugman's comment that "every serious progressive policy expert on either health care or financial reform who has weighed in on the primary seems to lean Hillary" and called into question the track-record of the so-called experts, saying, "Given their track record, the public has some cause for skepticism when being told that the experts all line up behind a particular candidate (which happens not to be true)."

James K. Galbraith, an economist from the University of Texas at Austin, wrote a letter that rebutted the critiques of Friedman's analysis. He defended the plausibility of 5.3% GDP growth using the example of the Reagan tax cuts, and defended Friedman's assumptions about the fiscal multiplier. He wrote: "It is not fair or honest to claim that Professor Friedman's methods are extreme. On the contrary, with respect to forecasting method, they are largely mainstream. Nor is it fair or honest to imply that you have given Professor Friedman's paper a rigorous review. You have not."

== Books ==
- Friedman, Gerald. State-Making and Labor Movements: France and the United States, 1876-1914. Ithaca: Cornell University Press, 1998. According to WorldCat, the book is held in 291 libraries
- Friedman, Gerald. Reigniting the Labor Movement: Restoring Means to Ends in a Democratic Labor Movement. London: Routledge, 2008.
- Friedman, Gerald. (ed) The Economic Crisis Reader: Readings in Economics, Politics, and Social Policy from Dollars & Sense. Boston: Economic Affairs Bureau, 2009.
