= Protogaea =

Work by Gottfried Leibniz

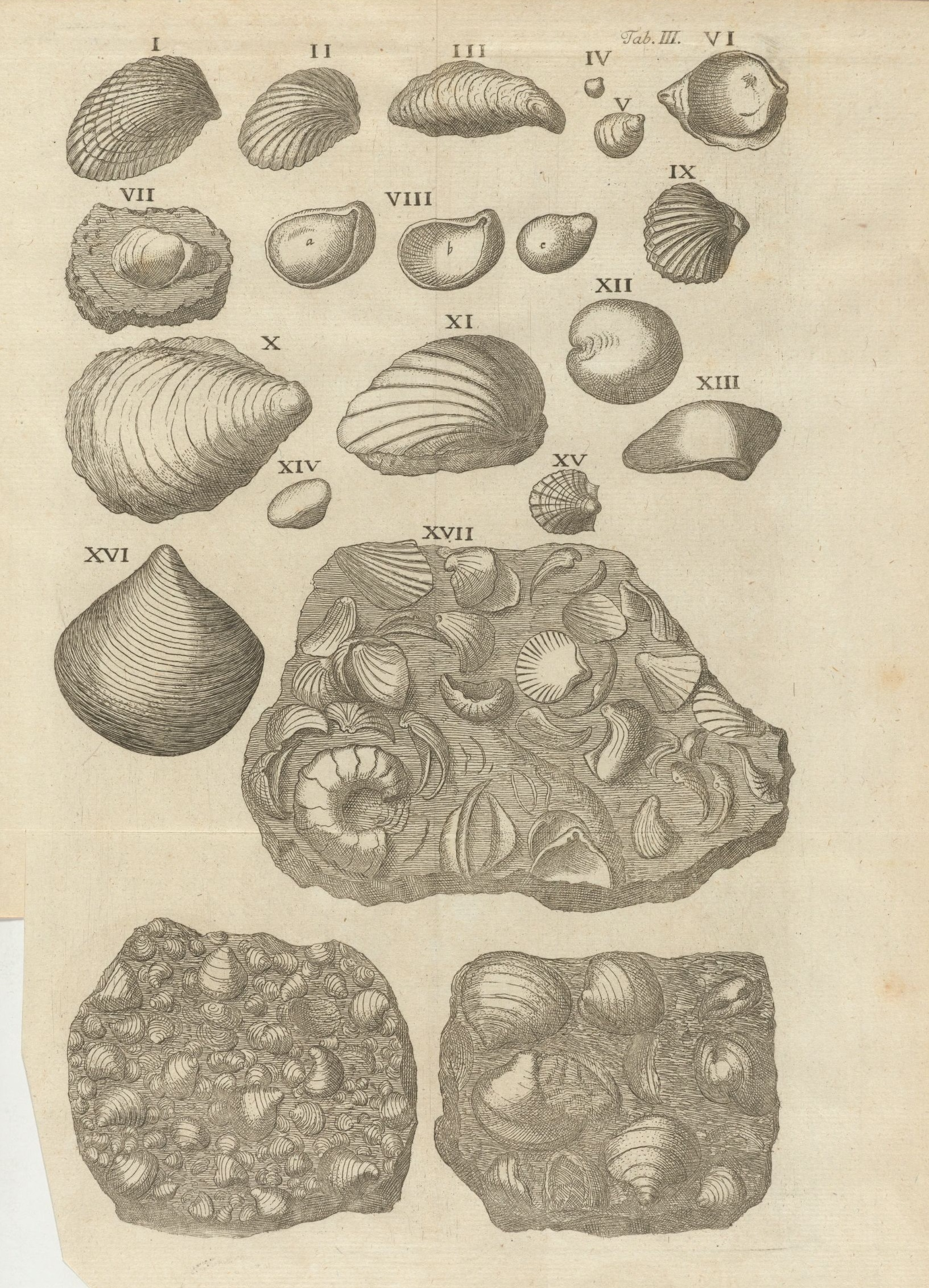
Illustration of the 1749 edition of Protogaea by Leibniz

Protogaea is a work by Gottfried Leibniz on geology and natural history. Unpublished in his lifetime, but made known by Johann Georg von Eckhart in 1719, it was conceived as a preface to his incomplete history of the House of Brunswick.

== Life ==
Protogaea is a history of the Earth written in conjectural terms; it was composed by Leibniz in the period from 1691 to 1693. A summary in Latin was published in 1693 in the Leipzig Acta Eruditorum. The text was first published in full at Göttingen in 1749, shortly after Benoît de Maillet's more far-reaching ideas on the origin of the Earth, circulated in manuscript, had been printed.

== Views ==
Protogaea built on, and criticized, the natural philosophy of René Descartes, as expressed in his Principia Philosophiae. Leibniz in the work adopted the Cartesian theory of the Earth as a sun crusted over with sunspots. He relied on the authority of Agostino Scilla writing about fossils to discredit the speculations of Athanasius Kircher and Johann Joachim Becher; he had met Scilla in Rome a few years earlier. He took up suggestions of Nicolaus Steno that argued for the forms of fossils being prior to their inclusion in rocks, for stratification, and for the gradual solidification of the Earth.
