= George Otis Smith =

American geologist (1871–1944)

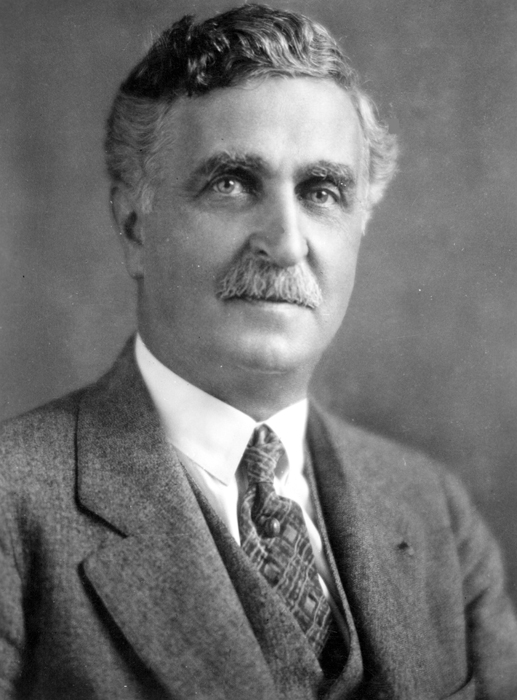

Member of the Federal Power Commission
- In office December 22, 1930 – October 31, 1933
- President: Herbert Hoover; Franklin D. Roosevelt
- Preceded by: Position established

4th Director of the United States Geological Survey
- In office 1907 – 1930
- Preceded by: Charles Doolittle Walcott
- Succeeded by: Walter Curran Mendenhall

Personal details
- Born: February 22, 1871 Hodgdon, Maine, US
- Died: January 10, 1944 (aged 72) Augusta, Maine, US
- Scientific career
- Education: Johns Hopkins University; Colby College
- Awards: Charles P. Daly Medal (1920)
- Fields: Petrography, geology
- Workplaces: US Geological Survey
- Thesis: The geology of the Fox Islands, Maine. A contribution to the study of old volcanics (1896)

George Otis Smith (February 22, 1871 – January 10, 1944) was an American geologist.

== Life and career ==
Smith was born in Hodgdon, Maine. He graduated from Colby College in 1893 and earned a Ph.D. from Johns Hopkins University in 1896. He served as the fourth director of United States Geological Survey from 1907 to 1922 and 1923 to 1930. He also served as the first chairman of the Federal Power Commission under Herbert Hoover from 1930 to 1933. Smith died in Augusta, Maine.

=== USGS career ===
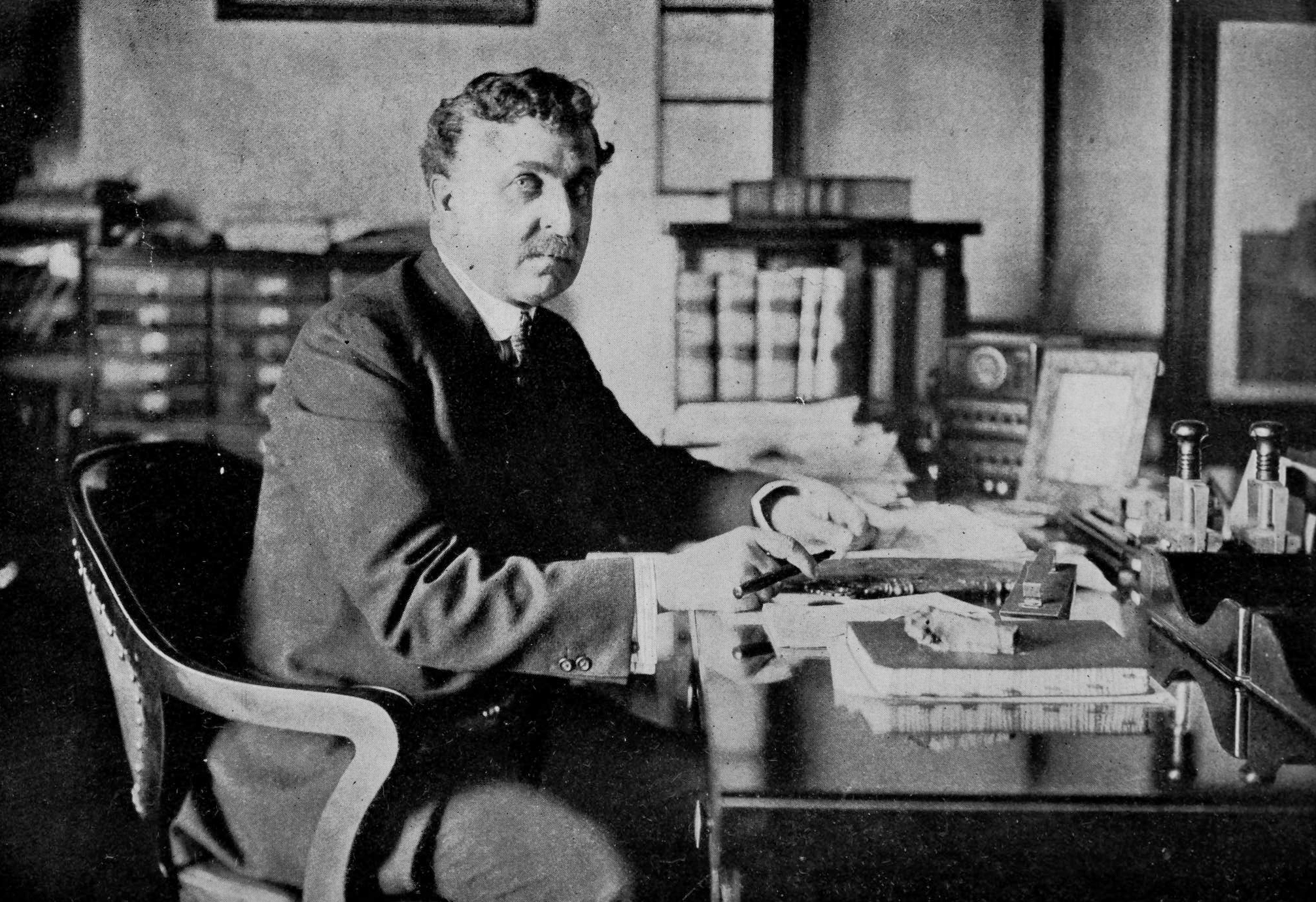
c. 1920

Smith was the Geologist-in-charge of the Section of Petrography of the Geologic Branch, succeeded Charles Doolittle Walcott as Director in May 1907 and continued as Director until December 1930. Smith had joined the Survey after receiving his doctorate from Johns Hopkins University in 1896, and he was barely 36 years old when he was appointed director. His Survey career had not been particularly distinguished, but he had come to the attention of the new Secretary of the Interior, James R. Garfield, in 1906 when Smith had served as chairman of one of the subcommittees of a Presidential commission that sought to put the operation of Government agencies on a modern businesslike basis. Smith was particularly interested in a business policy for the public domain. He also believed that the work of the Survey should be primarily although not exclusively practical.

After the great coal strike in 1922, a Coal Commission was established to study the problems of the industry and to aid Congress on legislation that would ensure the Nation of an adequate supply of coal. Director Smith was a member of the Commission, and the Geological Survey's resource data provided the basis for much of the Commission's report. In 1924, Smith unsuccessfully urged resumption of coal research in much the same terms as Walcott had used in 1898. Director Smith also served as Chairman of a three-man commission appointed by President Calvin Coolidge in March 1924, after the Teapot Dome scandal, to study the efficient management of the naval petroleum reserves, and as Chairman of the Advisory Committee to the Cabinet-level Federal Oil Conservation Board established in December 1924 to reappraise Federal oil policies.

In the fall of 1929, the first Hoover budget called for increased funds for scientific agencies, including $100,000 for fundamental research in geologic sciences, the first substantial increase in Federal funds for geologic investigations since 1915. In the spring of 1930, Congress appropriated $2.87 million for the Geological Survey and also appropriated funds for the expenses of a commission on the conservation and administration of the public domain. In December 1930, Hoover appointed Smith as chairman of the newly reorganized Federal Power Commission. (Walter Curran Mendenhall was appointed to succeed Smith as Director of the Geological Survey.)

In January 1931 the Senate purported to reconsider its consent to the appointment of Smith, and other members of the Commission, because it did not approve of their choice of subordinates. President Hoover did not recognise the Senate's authority to withdraw its consent to the appointment of officials after they had been commissioned. In May 1932 the US Supreme Court held that the appointments were effective. Smith served until 1933.

== Publications ==
- Smith, George Otis. "Notes on crystals of scapolite, gypsum, and fayalite..." Johns Hopkins University Circular, pp. 81–83 (1894)
- Smith, George Otis. "The volcanic series of the Fox Islands, ME" Johns Hopkins University Circular, pp. 12–13 (1895)
- Smith, George Otis. "The rocks of Mount Rainier" United States Geological Survey Annual Report, vol.18, Part 2, pp. 416–423 (1898)
- Smith, George Otis. "Igneous phenomena in the Tintic Mountains, Utah" Science, vol.7, pp. 502 (1898)
- Willis, Bailey; Smith, G O. "Description of the Tacoma Quadrangle, Washington" Geological Atlas Folio, Report: GF-0054, 10 pp. (1899)
- Smith, George Otis; Tower, G W; Emmons, S F. "Description of the Tintic special district, Utah" Geological Atlas Folio, Report: GF-0065, 8 pp. (1900)
- Smith, George Otis. "Geology and water resources of a portion of Yakima County, Washington" U. S. Geological Survey Water-Supply Paper, Report: W 0055, 68 pp. (1901)
- Smith, George Otis; Smith Physiography, G O; Range, Cascade; Willis, Bailey. "Contributions to the geology of Washington; geology and physiography of central Washington" U. S. Geological Survey Professional Paper, Report: P 0019, 101 pp. (1903)
- Smith, George Otis. "Work of the United States Geological Survey" Mining World, pp. 136–137 (1911)
- Smith, George Otis. "The policy of the Geological Survey" Science, pp. 401–403 (1912)
- Smith, George Otis. "Military contribution of civilian engineers" Geological Society of America Bulletin, vol. 30, no .3, pp. 399–404 (1919)
- Smith, George Otis. "Topographic and geologic maps" The Military Engineer, vol. 17, no. 95, pp. 381–395 (1925)
- Rickard, Thomas Arthur. "George Otis Smith [1871–1944] an appreciation" Mining and Metallurgy, vol.25, no.447, pp. 191 (1944)
- Smith, Philip Sidney. "Memorial to George Otis Smith (1871–1944)" Proceedings of the Geological Society of America, pp. 309–329, (May 1945)

Preceded by Charles Doolittle Walcott	Director of the United States Geological Survey; 1907–1930	Succeeded by Walter Curran Mendenhall
