= Daniel Deocampo =

- Education: Tufts University; Rutgers University
- Scientific career
- Fields: Geochemistry
- Workplaces: Georgia State University
- Doctoral advisor: Gail Ashley

Daniel Michael Deocampo is an American geologist, geochemist, and academic administrator. He was an associate dean and professor of geosciences at Georgia State University. Deocampo pleaded guilty to possession of child pornography on November 3, 2021.

== Early life and education ==
Deocampo was born to Helen Deocampo and cardiologist Paulino D. Deocampo of Holmdel Township, New Jersey. He completed a B.S. in geological sciences in 1994 at Tufts University. He earned a M.S. (1997) and Ph.D. (2001) in geological sciences at Rutgers University. His dissertation was titled Geochemistry and Sedimentology of Modern East African Wetlands and a Pleistocene Paleo-Wetland at Olduvai Gorge, Tanzania. His doctoral advisor was Gail Ashley.

He completed a postdoctoral fellowship at the National Museum of Natural History in 2001. In 2002, he was a postdoctoral research hydrologist in the water resources division of the United States Geological Survey in Reston, Virginia. He completed a postdoctoral fellowship at the Natural History Museum, London in 2003.

== Career ==
Deocampo joined the faculty at Georgia State University (GSU) in 2008 as an assistant professor. He became full professor of geosciences in 2016. Deocampo served as the GSU College of Arts and Sciences Associate Dean for Research, Innovation, and Graduate Studies from 2019 to 2021.

In 2014, Deocampo was elected fellow of the Geological Society of America.

== Personal life ==
The Federal Bureau of Investigation (FBI) and GSU Cyber Security identified Deocampo as the individual who had accessed multiple websites containing child pornography (or had links to other websites containing child pornography) from campus in November and December 2020. GSU Cyber Security also advised the FBI that Deocampo routinely accessed the university’s network from home. Based on that information, FBI determined that Deocampo was also accessing websites containing child pornography from his home on several days in late December 2020 and early January 2021. On January 6, 2021, the FBI executed search warrants at Deocampo's residence, as well as his GSU office and lab space. As a result of the search, agents recovered an Apple laptop belonging to Deocampo that contained more than 4,000 files of child pornography, including approximately 190 videos. On November 3, 2021, he pleaded guilty to possession of child pornography. On February 23, 2022, Deocampo was sentenced to 32 months in prison, 10 years of supervised probation, and a $10,100 special assessment.
