= Computational geophysics =

Computational geophysics is the field of study that uses any type of numerical computations to generate and analyze models of complex geophysical systems. It can be considered an extension, or sub-field, of both computational physics and geophysics. In recent years, computational power, data availability, and modelling capabilities have all improved exponentially, making computational geophysics a more populated discipline. Due to the large computational size of many geophysical problems, high-performance computing can be required to handle analysis. Modeling applications of computational geophysics include atmospheric modelling, oceanic modelling, general circulation models, and geological modelling. In addition to modelling, some problems in remote sensing fall within the scope of computational geophysics such as tomography, inverse problems, and 3D reconstruction.

== Geophysical models ==
The generation of geophysical models are a key component of computational geophysics. Geophysical models are defined as "physical-mathematical descriptions of temporal and/or spatial changes in important geological variables, as derived from accepted laws, theories, and empirical relationships." Geophysical models are frequently used by researchers in all disciplines of environmental science.

In climate science, atmospheric, oceanic, and general circulation models are a crucial standby for researchers. Although remote sensing has been steadily providing more and more in-situ measurements of geophysical variables, nothing comes close to the temporal and geospatial resolution of data provided by models. Although data can be subject to accuracy issues due to the extrapolation techniques used, the usage of modeled data is a commonly accepted practice in climate and meteorological sciences. Oftentimes, these models will be used in concert with in-situ measurements.

A few well-known models are

1. NCEP/NCAR Reanalysis Project, an atmospheric model
2. Global Forecast System, a numerical weather prediction model
3. HYCOM, a general ocean circulation model

Geological system models are frequently used in research, but have less public data availability than climatic and meteorological models. There is a wide range of software available that allows for geomodelling.

== Remote sensing ==
The United States Geological Survey (USGS) defines remote sensing as the measurement of some property by transmitting some type of radiation at a distance, and measuring the emitted and reflected radiation. Remote sensing can involve satellites, cameras, and sound wave emission. Remote sensing is inherently a type of indirect measurement, meaning that some type of computation must be completed in order to obtain a measurement of the property of interest. For some applications, these computations can be highly complex. In addition, the analysis of these data products can be classified as computational geophysics.

== Programs of study ==
In Canada, computational geophysics is offered as a university major in the form of a BSc (Hon.) with co-op at Carleton University.

Elsewhere, Rice University has a Center for Computational Geophysics, while Princeton University, the University of Texas, and California Institute of Technology have similar research centers. Experts, laboratories, projects, internships, undergraduate programs, graduate programs and/or facilities in the program exist at the University of Queensland, Wyoming University, Boston University, Stanford University, Uppsala University, Kansas State University, Kingston University, Australian National University, University of California, San Diego, University of Washington, Nanyang Technological University, ETH Zurich, University of Sydney, Appalachian State University, University of Minnesota, University of Tasmania, Bahria University, Boise State University, University of Michigan, University of Oulu, University of Utah, and others.

== Laboratories ==
Federal organizations that study or apply computational geophysics include

1. Earth System Research Laboratories at NOAA
2. Earth Sciences Division at NASA
3. Computational Geophysics Lab at the Earth Observatory of Singapore

== Software ==
- EIDORS
- GeoModeller
- Petrel (reservoir software)
- QuakeSim

== See also ==
- Computational fluid dynamics
- History of geophysics
- List of ocean circulation models
- Meteorological reanalysis
- Numerical weather prediction
