= Suzanne Takken =

Petroleum geologist

Suzanne Takken

Suzanne Takken (April 25, 1925 – 1997) was a petroleum geologist for the Magnolia Oil Company (Mobil Oil). She retired in 1970 but continued to work as a consultant in several areas of geology including construction, geothermal, petroleum, and uranium. She was a Charter Member of the Oklahoma City Geological Foundation, a member of the American Association of Petroleum Geologists (AAPG) and of the Association of Women in Geoscience (AWG), as well as a past president of both the Oklahoma section of American Institute of Professional Geologists and the Oklahoma City Geological Society. Later in her career the Suzanne Takken Encourage Award (1990) and the Suzanne Takken Memorial Fund (1998) were established in her honour.

== Personal life ==
Suzanne Takken was born April 25, 1925. She grew up in Cleveland, Ohio as an only child with her parents Clara and Russel Takken, chief engineer for the Cleveland Illuminating Company. She went to Rocky River High School and graduated in 1943. Immediately following her graduation she, like her father, enrolled in the University of Michigan where she pursued a Bachelor of Science degree in geology. During her time in university she found a job assisting professor George V. Cohee with studying rock samples which led her into a career of geology. Her father died in 1947, one week before she graduated from university. After graduating she was offered a job from the Magnolia Oil Company (Mobil Oil) which she accepted. The job had her and her mother move to Oklahoma City where she worked as a petroleum geologist. Her mother, Clara died in 1974. In Oklahoma, Takken also authored and co-authored many articles and books. She also became a professor at the Land Management School at the University of Oklahoma from 1978 to 1982. Takken retired from Mobil Oil in 1970 but continued working as a consultant until her death on November 9, 1997. She died due to a visceral hemorrhage after being honoured by the naming of the Suzanne Takken Encourage Award. During her time living in Oklahoma City she acquired many hobbies such as golf, oil painting, and amateur theatre work. In her later years, she loved traveling, with her favourite places being Orient and the Pacific Ocean, which is where she requested her ashes to be spread. Her love of traveling also led to her collecting many things such as seashells, stamps, books, paintings, carvings, statues, and ornamental boxes.

== Education ==
Suzanne attended Rocky River High School, where she graduated in 1943. After graduating high school, she attended the University of Michigan, the same university her father attended, where she studied geology. In 1947, Takken graduated with a degree in geology from the University of Michigan. Takken later continued her graduate studies at the University of Michigan, the University of Oklahoma, and the University of Nevada.

== Career ==
In 1947, after graduating from the University of Michigan with a degree in geology, Takken was hired by Mobil Oil to work as a petroleum geologist . The job had her move to Oklahoma City where most of her career took place. In the same year joined the American Association of Petroleum Geologists (AAPG), of which she remained a member for 50 years, as well as the Oklahoma City Geological Society (OCGS). In 1964 she became the 568th certified professional geologist to join the American Institute of Professional Geologists (AIPG). She also wrote a paper titled “Subsurface Geology of North Gotebo Area, Kiowa and Washita Counties”, Oklahoma which was published in the Shale Shaker in 1967. She retired from Mobil Oil in 1970 but continued her career in geology as a consultant and through her organizational work up until her death in 1997. In 1971, she served as the president of the AIPGs Oklahoma branch and then as their national secretary-treasurer in 1978. Also in 1978, she started working as an adjunct professor at the Land Management School at the University of Oklahoma. For her lectures she used the book “Landman’s Handbook on Petroleum Exploration” of which she was the author. During this time she also contributed to writing the “Developments in Oklahoma and Panhandle of Texas,” a series of annual reports on drilling development in the area. Her contributions to the report took place from 1977 to 1980. Takken concluded her teaching role at the University of Oklahoma in 1982. It was also during this year that she was awarded with honorary lifetime membership to the OCGS. At some point she joined the Association for Women Geoscientists (AWG), which she became more active in closer to the end of her life. Some of her contributions to the AWG include working as the AWG president (1989–1990) and serving as the director of the AWG foundation (1996–1997).

== Publications ==
1. Co-editor of Oil and Gas Fields of Oklahoma Volume 2 which was published by the OCGS in 1994
2. Cuttings and Cores, a periodic column published in the Shale Shaker Digest
3. Landman's Handbook on Petroleum, published in 1978 by the Institute of Energy Development (IED)
4. “Developments in Oklahoma and Panhandle of Texas” (1977–1980), published by the AAPG
  - Abstract: "Drilling activity increased again in 1978 both in number of wells drilled and footage cut. Success rates remained about the same in Oklahoma but declined slightly in the Texas Panhandle. Deep exploratory drilling also increased with a success rate of 40%, and average depths per well increased to 5,187 ft for development wells and 7,245 ft for wildcat wells. Seven successful wells and 8 dry holes are considered especially significant."
5. “East Cement Springer (Deep) Field,” Supplement I to Oil and Gas Fields of Oklahoma Volume 1, published by the OCGS in 1974
6. “Subsurface Geology of North Gotebo Area, Kiowa and Washita Counties, Oklahoma,” published in Shale Shaker in 1967

== Awards ==
Takken pursued a very successful career and was recognized for many of her achievements. She was an active member of many geological and geoscience groups and institutions, some of which included the American Institute of Professional Geologists, the American Association of Petroleum Geologists, and the Oklahoma City Geological Society. Takken was named president of the Association for Women Geoscientists (AWG) and they created an award in her honour known as the Suzanne Takken Encourage Award (1990). This award was created to honour her work and recognize her impact as a role model and mentor for women pursuing geoscience careers.

In 1998, the year after Suzanne Takken's death, Bonnie and Dennis Smith, Ralph Espach Jr., and Robert Northcutt established the Suzanne Takken Fund. The fund is in honor of Takken and assists “women attending college in pursuit of professional careers in the geosciences” by presenting yearly grants. The first grant was awarded in 1999.

Takken had received a number of awards herself throughout the length of her career, those which include:

- Oklahoma City Geo Society Editor Awards (1956–1958)
- Oklahoma City Geo Society Appreciation Plaque (1961–1962)
- Association for Women Geoscientists Enhance Award (1984)
- AIPG Award of Recognition (1971–1972)
- Mobil Meritorious Service Award (1970)
- Oklahoma City Geo Society Certificate of Appreciation (1985)
- Oklahoma City Geological Society Life Membership Certificate (1982)
- Association of Women Geoscientists Distinguished Service Certificate (1993 and another in 1996)
