= Deocampo =

Deocampo is a surname. Notable people with the surname include:

- Daniel Deocampo, American geologist, geochemist, and academic administrator
- Nick Deocampo (born 1959), Filipino filmmaker and film historian
