= Sarah K. Noble =

Planetary geologist

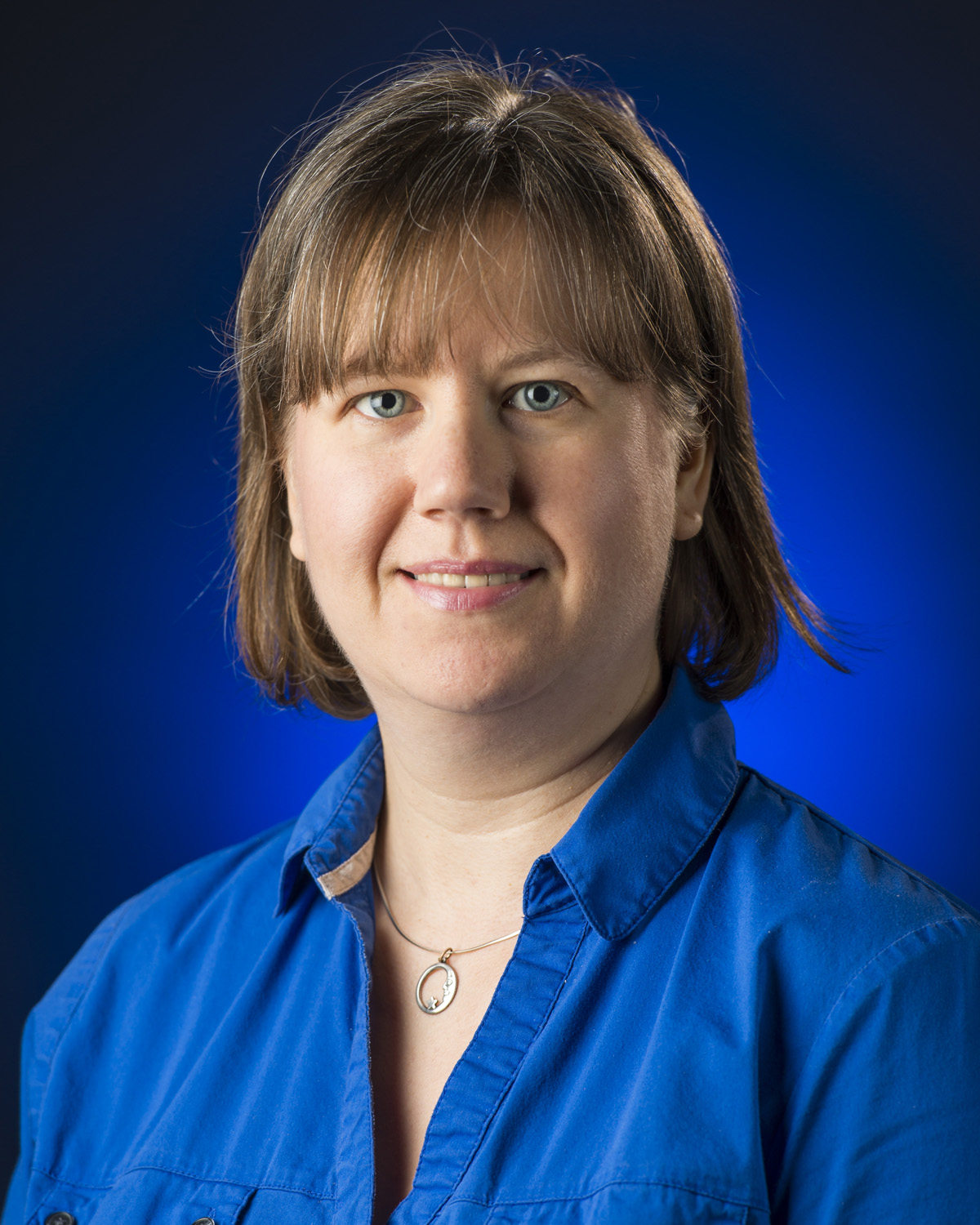
- Born: Big Lake, Minnesota
- Education: University of Minnesota; Brown University
- Scientific career
- Fields: Planetary geology
- Workplaces: Johnson Space Center; United States House Committee on Science, Space and Technology; Marshall Space Flight Center; Goddard Space Flight Center; NASA Headquarters
- Doctoral advisor: Carle M. Pieters

Sarah K. Noble (born 1975) is a planetary geologist and a program scientist in the Planetary Science Division at NASA Headquarters in Washington, D.C. Her area of expertise is space weathering processes. She was the Program Scientist for NASA's LADEE spacecraft, and is the Program Scientist for the Psyche mission.

== Career ==
Sarah Noble earned her B.S. in geology with honor from the University of Minnesota in 1998, her M.S. in geological sciences from Brown University in 2000, and her Ph.D. in geological sciences from Brown University in 2004. In 1997 during her undergraduate studies, Noble was selected as a summer intern at the Lunar and Planetary Institute. After graduating, Noble worked as a congressional staffer with the United States House Committee on Science, Space and Technology and then went on to serve as a NASA Postdoctoral Fellow at the Johnson Space Center in Houston, Texas. In 2008 she became a NASA Postdoctoral Management Fellow at NASA Headquarters and later went on to a position as a research scientist at the University of Alabama in Huntsville and Marshall Space Flight Center where she worked on lunar mapping and modeling and space weathering-related issues. From September 2010 – 2014, Noble split her time been working on a variety of research and program activities at the Goddard Space Flight Center and NASA Headquarters. In 2014 she began working at HQ full-time.

She was the Program Scientist for the LADEE mission. She is also the Program Scientist for the Psyche mission and was the Deputy Program Scientist for Mars 2020 from January 2014 through April 2017.

In addition to her scientific research, Noble is a painter, and much of her artistic work is inspired by space exploration and alien worlds.

== Awards ==
Noble has received many awards including a NASA Graduate Student Researchers Program Fellowship and NASA ROSES2010 Lunar Advanced Science and Exploration Research (LASER) grant. She has served as a Geological Society of America committee member and as an Association for Women Geoscientists board member. She has co-authored many scholarly articles about space weathering and the lunar surface.

In August 2015, main-belt asteroid 133432 Sarahnoble was named in her honor.
