= Variscale =

A variscale is variable length mechanical scale (ruler) designed to directly measure latitude and longitude on USGS maps.
