= Earth's critical zone =

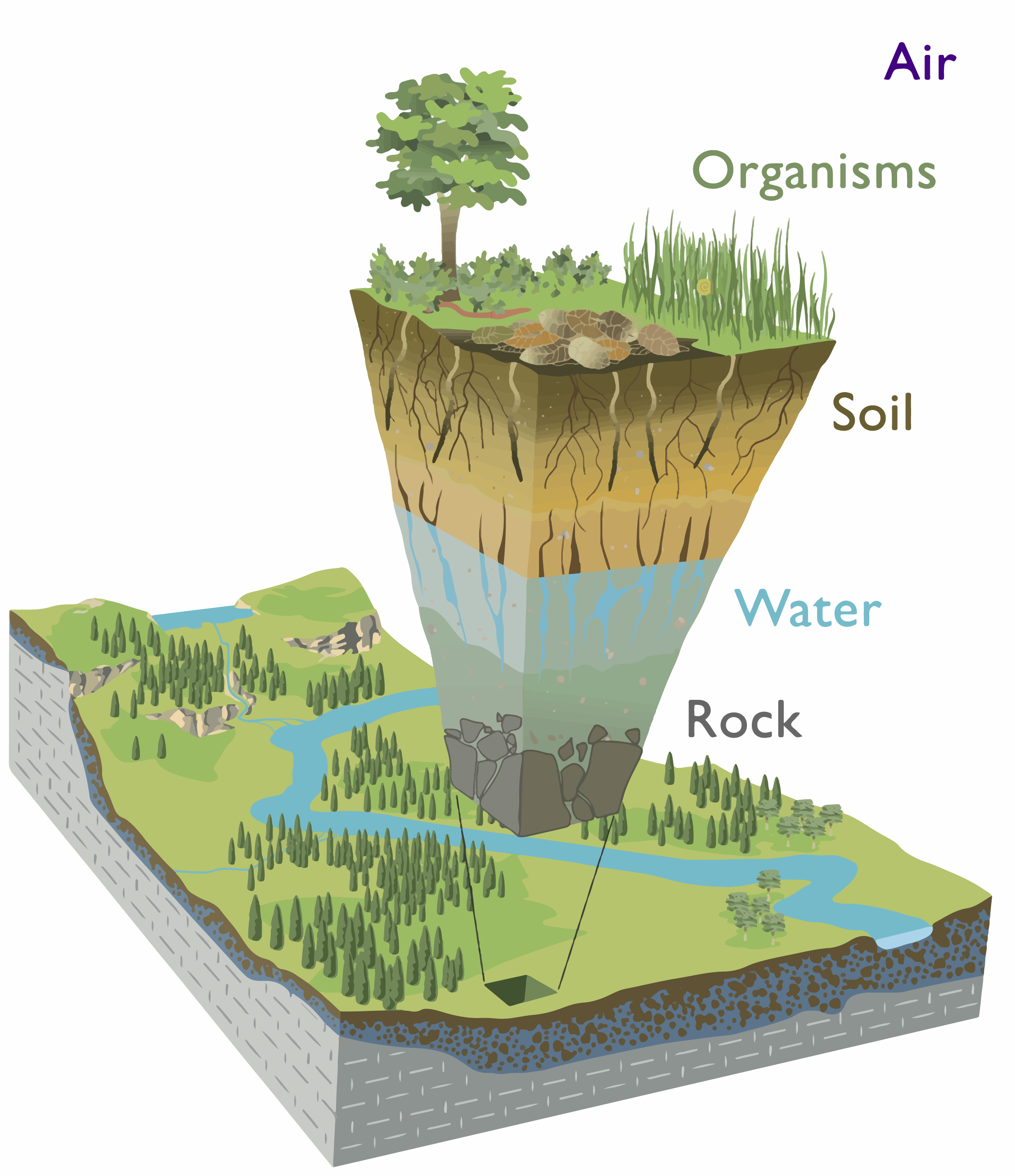
Earth's critical zone. Illustration by Critical Zone Observatories (CZO) based on a figure in Chorover et al. 2007.

Earth's critical zone is the “heterogeneous, near surface environment in which complex interactions involving rock, soil, water, air, and living organisms regulate the natural habitat and determine the availability of life-sustaining resources” (National Research Council, 2001). The Critical Zone, surface and near-surface environment, sustains nearly all terrestrial life.

The critical zone is an interdisciplinary field of research exploring the interactions among the land surface, vegetation, and water bodies, and extends through the pedosphere, unsaturated vadose zone, and saturated groundwater zone. Critical Zone science is the integration of Earth surface processes (such as landscape evolution, weathering, hydrology, geochemistry, and ecology) at multiple spatial and temporal scales and across anthropogenic gradients. These processes impact mass and energy exchange necessary for biomass productivity, chemical cycling, and water storage.

The critical zone is studied at Critical Zone Observatories, where multiple scientific communities study various aspects of the critical zone that can lead to synthesized understanding of complex systems.

== History ==
Dimitrios Tsakalotos first introduced the term critical zone in chemistry literature in 1909 to describe the binary mixture of two fluids, but has since been adopted to refer to the "connection of vegetation to soil and weathered materials" by Gail Ashley in 1998.

In October 2003, scientists attended the first Weathering System Science Workshop. Participants agreed to promote outreach activities to broaden the profile of involved Earth scientists and crafted a set of questions that would drive further development of Weathering System Science. This field of science was considered to include all aspects of chemistry, biology, physics, and geology of the critical zone.

The Weathering System Science Consortium was established in early 2004 and later was changed to the Critical Zone Exploration Network (CZEN) in 2006.

In October 2005 WSSC/CZEN solicitated a call for proposals to initiate seed sites that would help grow and establish a critical zone network. In total, ten sites have been awarded grants, and nine sites have received continued funding.

In 2005, the University of Delaware hosted an NSF-sponsored workshop that resulted in a call by scientists for an international initiative to study the critical zone. As key parts of that initiative, the scientists called for the development of an international Critical Zone initiative and a systematic approach to the investigation of processes in the critical zone across a broad array of sciences, including geology, soil science, biology, ecology, chemistry, geochemistry, geomorphology, and hydrology. A booklet, Frontiers in Exploration of the Critical Zone, was produced from the meeting.

On July 24, 2006 NSF posted a solicitation for proposals for Critical Zone Observatories (CZO) within the Division of Earth Sciences.

Established in 2009, the Delaware Environmental Institute (DENIN) is a multidisciplinary initiative bringing together scientists, engineers, and policy specialists to provide solutions to pressing environmental needs and produce strategies to address emerging environmental challenges by conducting research and promoting and coordinating knowledge partnerships that integrate environmental science, engineering and policy. DENIN fosters a culture of scholarship that leverages the combined talents of affiliates and fellows through collaborative working groups, joint proposal development and, where synergistic, project resource coordination.
