= U.S. Geological Survey National Center =

Historic building in Reston, Virginia, US

- U.S. National Register of Historic Places
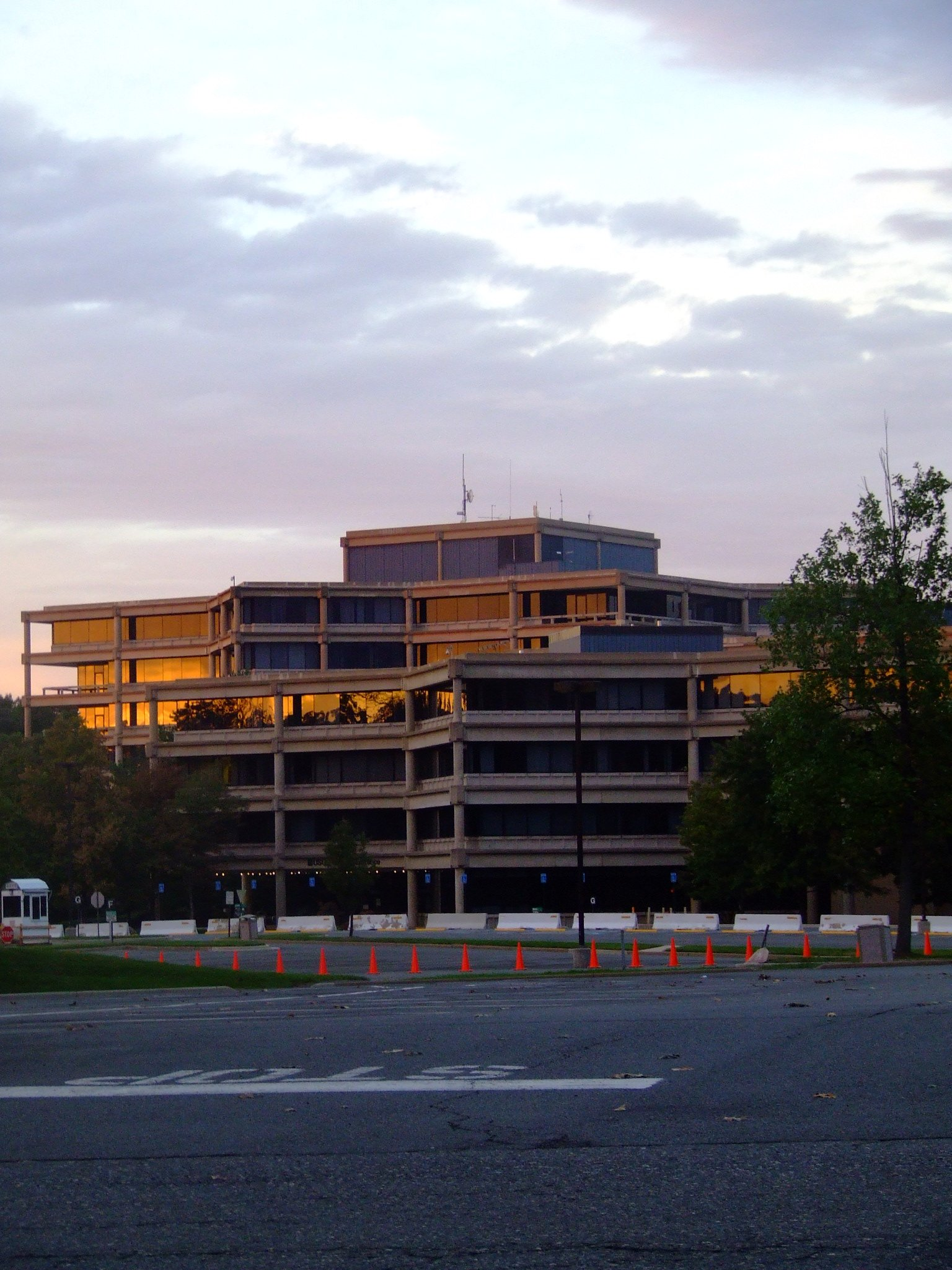
- U.S. Geological Survey National Center in 2006

- Location within Northern Virginia Location within Virginia Location within the United States
- Location: 12201 Sunrise Valley Drive, Reston, VA, 20192
- Coordinates: 38°56′59″N 77°22′03″W
- Built: 1974
- NRHP reference No.: 100005414
- Added to NRHP: August 10, 2020

The U.S. Geological Survey National Center, officially the John Wesley Powell Federal Building, is a historic building and the headquarters of the United States Geological Survey (USGS)—an agency of the U.S. Department of the Interior (DOI)—located in Reston, Virginia. Built in 1974, it was listed on the National Register of Historic Places in 2020.

== Description ==
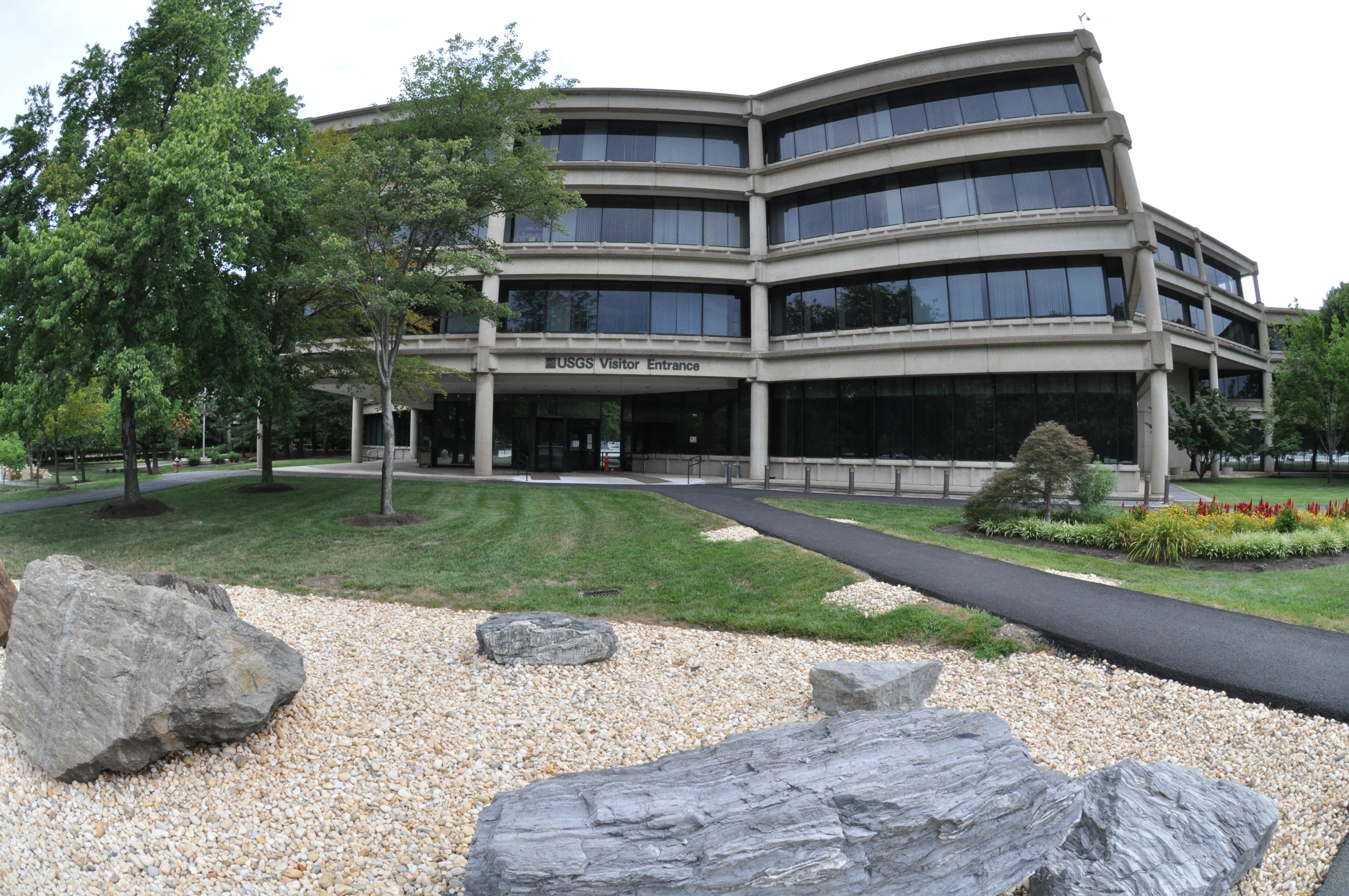
U.S. Geological Survey National Center visitor entrance in 2011

The approximately 1,000,000 ft^{2} (93,000 m^{2}), 1,200 ft (370 m) long U.S. Geological Survey National Center building sits on a 105-acre (42 ha) site. The building was built in part to embody the Survey's mission. Notably, the main tower’s eight-pointed star shape symbolizes the cardinal points of a compass. The main tower contains seven floors; other parts of the building range from two to five floors. Originally the building was divided into three main sections—the agency administration offices, the laboratories, and the map reproduction area. From 1974 until the early-2000s, the map production area was the printing plant for USGS topographic maps and other paper products. The USGS Library, authorized by Congress in 1879, houses one of the world’s largest Earth and natural science collections. The building originally had the capacity to house nearly 2,500 employees.

== History ==
A 1984 visitors' guide with a map of the complex

=== Previous USGS office buildings ===
Prior to the current headquarters of the USGS, the agency had been located in several other buildings in Washington. At its 1879 establishment, the USGS was located at the corner of 8th and G Streets Northwest, adjacent to the then-current United States Patent and Trademark Office building. In 1882, the office relocated to inside the Arts and Industries Building (then known as the National Museum of the Smithsonian) located beside the National Mall. In 1917, the USGS headquarters was relocated to the Hooe Iron Building at the corner of 10th and G Streets Northwest. The last building the agency moved to before its current headquarters was the newly built Main Interior Building in 1937, in which the USGS shared its offices with other DOI agencies.

=== Construction of the U.S. Geological Survey National Center ===
==== Pre-construction ====
In 1959, the General Services Administration (GSA) submitted a prospectus to Congress for a $32,240,000 project that would construct a new United States Geological Survey building under the Public Buildings Act of 1959. The prospectus had to be resubmitted in 1961 and would finally be approved in 1962.

In 1964, the GSA signed a contract with Chicago-based architectural firm Skidmore, Owings, and Merrill and H. D. Nottingham & Associates of Arlington, Virginia for a pre-design study of the building, which included the evaluation of potential sites. A wooded site just south of the Dulles Access Road and the in-development community of Reston was selected on February 1, 1966, and on February 3, the firms signed another contract with the GSA for a more-detailed study of the newly selected site. The study would be completed in April and approved by the National Capital Planning Commission on July 28. In August, the U.S. Government would negotiate with the Reston developers to purchase the selected land, which resulted in the gift from the developers of 50 acres (20 ha) of land and the government purchasing another 35 acres (14 ha) at $7,000 per 1-acre (0.40 ha). An additional 20 acres (8.1 ha) were purchased at the same price in 1969 as previously negotiated in the 1966 deal.

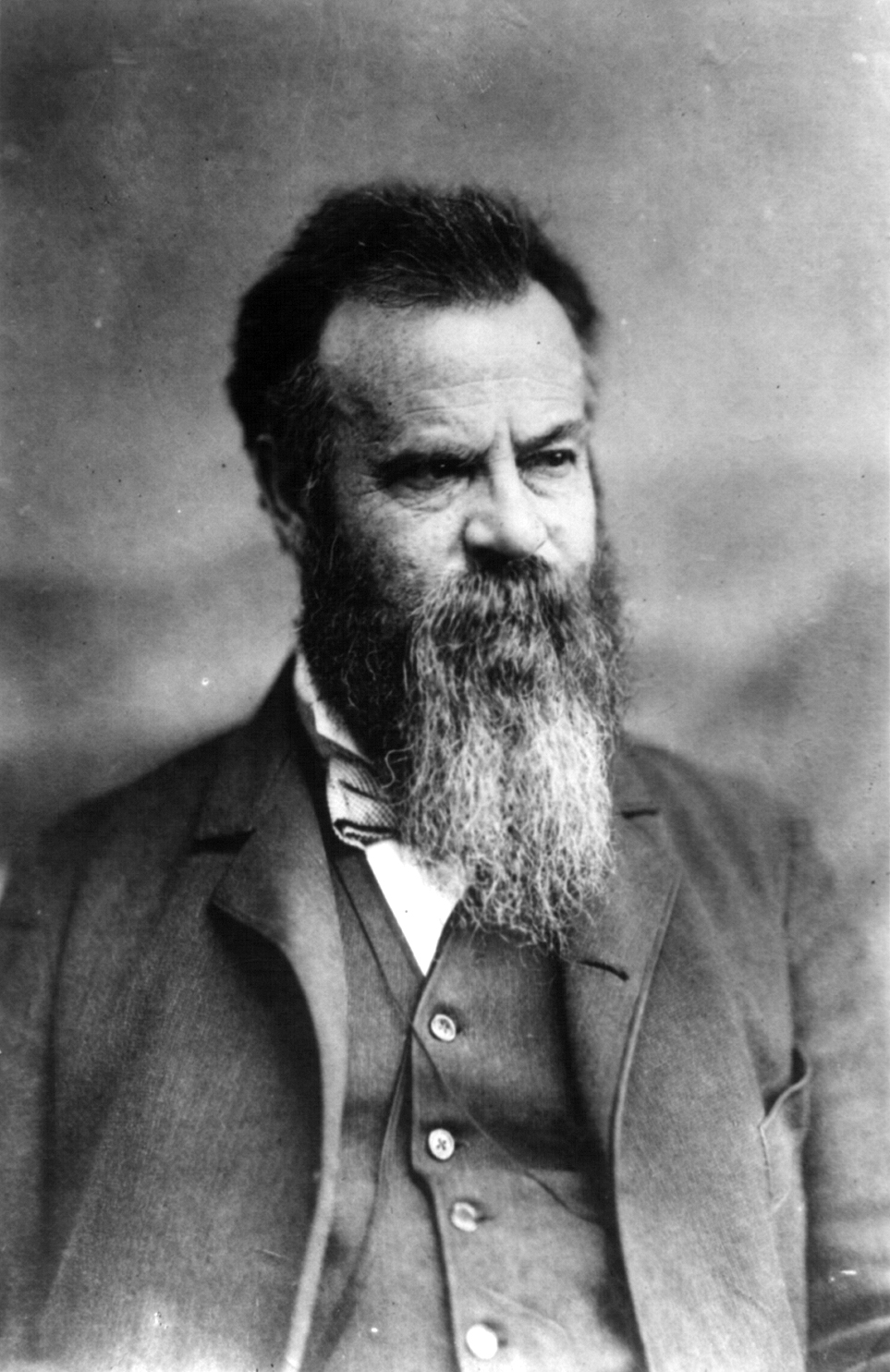
John Wesley Powell (1834–1902), director of the USGS from 1881 to 1894

==== Construction and completion ====
Crews completed clearing trees at the site in 1970, preserving some of the forest around the future parking lots. Bids for construction at the site were submitted later that year, with the George H. Hyman Construction Company submitting the low bid. The company was granted a $44,118,000 construction contract on June 29, 1971, by Gulf Reston, Inc., the new developers of the Reston community. On July 31, 1971, construction began immediately after a groundbreaking ceremony. Construction was completed in 1974 and an opening ceremony for the building was held on July 12 of that year. Announced at the ceremony, in dedication of the second director of the United States Geological Survey from 1881 to 1894, Civil War veteran and geologist John Wesley Powell, the building would be officially named the John Wesley Powell Federal Building. During his term at the USGS, Powell himself had envisioned a new building for the agency, which would have been located near the National Museum of the Smithsonian.

=== Preservation ===
On August 10, 2020, the National Park Service listed the U.S. Geological Survey National Center on the National Register of Historic Places.
