= Association for Women Geoscientists =

The Association for Women Geoscientists (AWG) is an international professional organization which promotes the professional development of its members, provides geoscience outreach to girls, and encourages the participation of girls and women in the geosciences. Membership is open to all who support AWG's goals. Members include professional women and men from industry, government, museums and academia, students from a cross-section of colleges and universities, retirees, and others interested in supporting the society's goals.

== History ==
AWG was founded in San Francisco in 1977. The original purpose of the society was to provide encouragement to women in the geosciences, a career choice in which they were largely underrepresented at the time. As of 2006, the purpose remains the same despite the advances that have been made in the field, as AWG membership includes over 1,000 students and scientists, reflecting the increasing participation of women in the geosciences. AWG is a 501(c)(6) mutual benefit corporation with local chapters in many cities and at-large members throughout the U.S. and around the world. AWG is a member society of the American Geological Institute and the Geological Society of America.

== Notable members ==
- Claudia Alexander
- Gail Ashley
- Denise Cox
- Francisca Oboh Ikuenobe
- Sharon Mosher
- Sarah K. Noble
- Sian Proctor

== Activities ==
The society provides and sponsors several programs that strive to achieve the goals of the society:

- The Association for Women Geoscientsts Distinguished Lecturer Program is a Speakers Bureau of female geoscientists available to give AWG-funded talks or lectures on their areas of interest
- Scholarships
- AWG Outstanding Educator Award
- GAEA bi-monthly newsletter
- Geology field trips
