= Francisca Oboh Ikuenobe =

Nigerian geologist

Francisca E. Oboh Ikuenobe
- Born: August 1962 (age 64); Nigeria
- Education: University of Cambridge
- Awards: Women's hall of fame Missouri inductee
- Scientific career
- Fields: Geology, Palynology, Stratigraphy
- Workplaces: Missouri University of Science and Technology

Francisca Oboh-Ikuenobe is a geologist from Ubiaja in Esan South East Local Government Area of Edo State. She was born in August 1962. She specialises in palynology and sedimentology, and is Professor of Geology in the Department of Geosciences and Geological and Petroleum Engineering, and Associate Dean of Academic Affairs in the College of Engineering and Computing, Missouri University of Science and Technology.

== Education and early career ==
Oboh-Ikuenobe attended St. Maria Goretti Girls Grammar School Benin-city, Nigeria. She gained a first-class BSc in geology in 1983, after which she worked as a production geologist for Shell Petroleum Development Company of Nigeria in Lagos, and palynologist with Shell at their geological laboratory in Warri Delta State, before returning to graduate school for her MSc in applied geology in 1987, from the University of Ife Nigeria (now Obafemi Awolowo University). Following this she held position as an assistant lecturer at Ife University. She was awarded a Commonwealth Scholarship Commission Award for her doctorate at the Department of Earth Sciences, University of Cambridge (New Hall, now Murray Edwards College), which was awarded in 1991 with her thesis 'Palaeoenvironmental Reconstruction of the E2.0 Reservoir in the Kolo Creek Field, Niger Delta (Nigeria)'. She joined Missouri S&T, then Department of Geology and Geophysics in 1991 as an assistant professor in geology.

== Professional career ==
In 1997 Oboh-Ikuenobe was appointed associate professor of geology, in 2005 full professor, and program head in geology and geophysics from 2006 to 2014. She was appointed interim department chair from January 2015 until July 2017. She is currently associate dean for academic affairs in the College of Engineering and Computing. In addition to her academic positions she has worked as Shipboard Sedimentologist on the Ocean Drilling Program (Leg 159 Eastern Equatorial Atlantic Transform Margin) January to February 1995. Amongst other offices she was president elect, president and past president of the AASP (The Palynological Society) from 2010 to 2013, member-at-large on the Geological Society of America Diversity in the Geosciences Committee from 2012 to 2015, director of the Association for Women Geoscientists Foundation, 2005–2008, an editorial board member of Palynology journal, 1995 to 2009, and associate editor of the Journal of African Earth Sciences since 2019. In 2010 and 2011 she was a workshop leader for 'On the Cutting Edge', a professional development program for current and prospective geoscience faculty members, supported by the National Association of Geoscience Teachers and funded by the National Science Foundation. Since 2013, she has been a member of the International Geoscience Programme (IGCP) Scientific Board (Global Change Group), which is under the umbrella of UNESCO/International Union of Geological Sciences. Oboh-Ikuenobe is an elected fellow of the Geological Society of America, American Association for the Advancement of Science, and The Paleontological Society.

In 2024, a newly discovered species of dinoflagellate cyst was named Batiacasphaera obohikuenobeae in recognition of her work in marine sedimentology.

== Research ==
Her research falls under the categories of palynology and sedimentology, with the former including studies of pollen and other palynomorphs within sediments and sedimentary rocks as a proxy for biostratigraphic, palaeoecological and palaeoclimatic reconstructions. She also integrates palynofacies with organic geochemistry. Dr. Francisca Oboh-Ikuenobe is recognized for her extensive research in palynology, studying microfossils with organic walls such as pollen and dinoflagellate cysts. This research has significant implications for understanding Earth's historical climatic and environmental conditions. Through her work, she has contributed to a deeper understanding of biostratigraphy, paleoecology, and paleoclimatic conditions across various parts of the world, including regions as diverse as the Americas, Australia, western and southern Africa, Egypt, and Iraq. Her academic journey, leading to her current roles at the Missouri University of Science and Technology as Professor of Geosciences and Petroleum Engineering and Associate Dean for Academic Affairs, reflects her dedication to advancing geoscience education and research https://www.museumoftheearth.org/daring-to-dig/bio/oboh-ikuenobe https://community.geosociety.org/gbgm/dfg/franciscaoboh-ikuenobe.

One notable aspect of Dr. Oboh-Ikuenobe's research is her innovative use of machine learning to study fossil pollen, which represents a significant advancement in the field of palynology. This method combines high-resolution imaging techniques with artificial intelligence, enhancing the efficiency and accuracy of identifying fossilized pollen grains. Such advancements are crucial for understanding plant evolution and environmental changes over geological time periods https://news.mst.edu/2020/11/researchers-apply-machine-learning-to-study-fossil-pollen/.

== Selected publications ==
- Mathur, R., Mahan, B., Spencer, M., Godfrey, L., Landman, N., Garb, M., Pearson, G.D., Liu, S.-A., and Oboh-Ikuenobe, F.E., 2021. Fingerprinting the Cretaceous-Paleogene boundary impact with Zn isotopes. Nature Communications, 12:4128; https://doi.org/10.1038/s41467-021-24419-8.
- Romero, I.C., Kong, S., Fowlkes, C.C., Urban, M.A., Jaramillo, C., Oboh-Ikuenobe, F., D’Apolito, C., and Punyasena, S.W., 2020. Improving the taxonomy of fossil pollen using convolutional neural networks and superresolution microscopy. Proceedings of the National Academy of Sciences; www.pnas.org/cgi/doi/10.1073/pnas.2007324117.
- Oboh-Ikuenobe, F.E., Antolinez-Delgado, H., and Awad, W.K., 2017. Dinoflagellate cyst assemblages, biostratigraphy and paleoenvironment of a Paleocene-Early Eocene sedimentary succession in the northern Niger Delta Basin: Comparison with low, mid and high latitude regions. Palaeogeography, Palaeoclimatology, Palaeoecology, v. 481, p. 29-43; doi: 10.1016/j.palaeo.2017.05.020.
- Barron, A., Zobaa, M.K., and Oboh-Ikuenobe, F.E., 2017. Palynological evidence for sustained deep-marine conditions during the Eocene-Miocene in the southern Gulf of Mexico distal continental margin. Geological Society of America Bulletin, v. 129, p. 218-228; doi: 10.1130/B31559.1.
- Pletsch, T., Erbacher, J., Holbourne, A.E.L., Kuhnt, W., Moullade, M., Oboh-Ikuenobe, F.E., Söding, E., and Wagner, T., 2001. Cretaceous separation of Africa and South America: the view from the West African margin (ODP Leg 159). Journal of South American Earth Sciences, v. 14, p. 147-174.
- Jaramillo, C.A., and Oboh-Ikuenobe, F.E., 1999. Sequence stratigraphic interpretations from palynofacies, dinocyst and lithological data of Upper Eocene-Lower Oligocene strata in southern Mississippi and Alabama, U.S. Gulf Coast. Palaeogeography, Palaeoclimatology, Palaeoecology, v. 145, p. 259-302.
- Oboh, F.E., 1992. Middle Miocene palaeoenvironments of the Niger Delta. Palaeogeography, Palaeoclimatology, Palaeoecology, v. 92, p. 55-84.

== Awards ==
- Medal for Excellence in Education, AASP - The Palynological Society, 2023
- Women's Hall of Fame Inductee, Missouri University fo Science and Technology, 2022
- Elected Fellow, The Paleontological Society, 2020
- Elected Fellow, American Association for the Advancement of Science (AAAS), 2017
- Elected Fellow, Geological Society of America (GSA), 2011
- Fulbright Specialist Roster Candidate, 2010–2015
- Elite American Educators, 2010–present
- Best Poster Award — XXIII Brazilian Congress of Paleontology, Gramado, 2013
- Woman of Legacy, Voices of Edo Women, 2011
- Science and Technology Award, Nigerian People's Forum— USA, 2008
- NSF Committee of Visitors, 2008
- SEPM Outstanding Journal Paper Award, Journal of Sedimentary Research 2007
- American Men and Women of Science, 1994–present
