= Sharon Mosher =

American geologist

- Education: Brown University; University of Illinois Urbana-Champaign
- Scientific career
- Fields: Geology
- Workplaces: University of Texas

Sharon Mosher is an American geologist. She did her undergraduate work at University of Illinois Urbana-Champaign. After earning an MSc from Brown University, she returned to the University of Illinois to get her PhD in Geology in 1978. She was a professor at the University of Texas at Austin her entire career, and since 2001, she has held the William Stamps Farish Chair at University of Texas at Austin. From 2009 to 2020 she served as dean of the Jackson School of Geosciences at Texas, the largest geosciences academic institution in the country.

She brought new life to two major geological associations as the president of the Geological Society of America in 2000-2001, establishing new programs and sound fiscal management, and the American Geosciences Institute in 2012-2013. In the early 2000’s, she recognized the importance of transitioning geoscientific society journals from paper to electronic and aggregating them and led a small group of geoscientific societies to found GeoScienceWorld, an international journal aggregation for geoscientists. She served as Chair of the Board until 2009. As a longtime board member of the Council of Scientific Society Presidents, serving as Chair in 2004, she became a strong advocate for science in public policy. From 2013 to 2023, she spearheaded National Science Foundation sponsored initiatives on the Future of Undergraduate Geoscience Education and Shaping the Future of Graduate Geoscience Education, which led to changes in geoscience curriculum across the country that better prepares students for the future workforce.

Among her awards and honors, she is a fellow of the Geological Society of America, from which she received the Distinguished Service Award in 2003, and an honorary fellow of the Geological Society of London. In 2022 she was awarded the William B. Heroy Jr. Award for Distinguished Service to American Geoscience Institute, and in 2021 the Council of Scientific Societies Visionary Leadership Award. In 1990 she was named Outstanding Educator by the Association for Women Geoscientists. She received the 2016 Alumni Achievement Award from the University of Illinois College of Liberal Arts & Sciences, her alma mater. In 2020 she was given a lifetime achievement award as the Marcus Milling Legendary Geoscientist by the American Geoscience Institute for all her achievements in Earth Sciences. In 2023 she was inducted into the Jackson School of Geosciences Hall of Distinction.

== Research ==
Her primary research interests are in the evolution of complexly deformed terranes, strain analysis, deformation mechanisms, and the interaction between chemical and physical processes during deformation.

Mosher's research involves structural petrology and field-oriented structural geology. She created and tested a new model for the Precambrian collisional orogen along the southern margin of Laurentia, with specific emphasis the Llano uplift of central Texas and on the Sierra Diablo foothills of west Texas. Dr. Mosher made great advancements in the study of plate tectonics, changing the way of thinking of many in this field by showing plate tectonics was already active in the Mesoproterozoic. Traditionally, Mesoproterozoic mountain belts have been thought of as lacking of ophiolites, high and ultra high pressure metamorphic rocks, elements needed to establish subduction, but through her and her research group’s work, Dr. Mosher has proven this not to be the case. She also studied the evolution of the Macquarie Ridge Complex, the Pacific-Australian plate boundary south of New Zealand, exploring how strain was partitioned during the boundary’s evolution from a spreading center to a transform plate boundary, the processes that allowed the deformation, and the discontinuation of magmatism. Macquarie ridge is unique as part of the ocean floor has been uplifted in place on Macquarie Island allowing it to be studied on land. Another of her research projects focused on the partitioning of different types of strain during formation of ductile non-coaxial shear zones in both extensional and contractional environments, including the development of corrugations in metamorphic core complexes and the formation of rods and mullions in thrust nappes. For her Ph.D. research, she showed that the Purgatory Conglomerate in Rhode Island was only deformed by pressure solution, demonstrating for the first time the importance pressure solution as a deformation mechanism and quantifying its effects. In her early career, her research group’s work on the Narragansett Basin of Rhode Island and surrounding areas documented the effects of high-grade metamorphism, complex ductile deformation and granite intrusions, demonstrating for the first time that the Pennsylvanian-aged Alleghenian Orogeny also affected southeastern New England during the final closure of the Atlantic Ocean to form Pangea.

== Academic experience ==
Mosher is currently an emeritus dean and emeritus professor at the Jackson School of Geosciences at the University of Texas at Austin. She was a faculty member at the University of Texas from 1978, becoming a full professor in 1990, until her retirement in 2021. She specialized in structural geology, structural petrology and tectonics, teaching students at both the undergraduate and graduate level and has supervised 18 PhD students and 35 MS students on projects of structural and tectonic interest ranging from Tierra del Fuego, Chile to western Australia, Scotland, Italy, western U.S., Texas and New England. She has over 40 years of field and mapping experience, and was a Field Camp director for 15 years.

== Personal life ==
As a child in Illinois, Sharon Mosher was fascinated by geology, conducting mineral tests on rocks in the chemistry lab her dad set up for her in their basement. She decided she wanted to be a geologist the moment she learned that's what you'd call a person who studies rocks. Mosher’s father would take her as a child on Illinois State Geological Survey field trips, and whenever her family went on their annual vacation, Mosher would map the route, figuring out stops where she and her older sister could find rocks. Mosher continues to map out routes for interesting geology, but her career led her to also map the future of geoscience organizations.

== Publications ==
Selected publications include:

Mosher, S., and Gillis, G, 2025, Tectonic history of the Mesoproterozoic Coal Creek serpentinite, Llano Uplift, central Texas, USA: Geological Society of America Bulletin, v.137, n. 5-6, p. 2473–2488. https://doi.org/10.1130/B37801.1

Mosher, S., Ryan, J., and Keane, C., 2023, Vision and Change in the Geosciences: Shaping the Future of Graduate Geoscience Education, American Geoscience Institute. 107p.

Southern, S.C., Mosher, S., Orlandini, O.F., 2022, Strain Partitioning in the Moine Nappe, Northernmost Scotland: Geosphere; https://doi.org/10.1130/GES02522.1.

Betka, P., Mosher, S., and Klepeis, K., 2022, Progressive development of a distributed ductile shear zone beneath the Patagonian retroarc fold-thrust belt, Chile: Lithosphere, 2022 (1): 3820115.

Mosher, S., Harrison, W., Huntoon, J., Keane, C., McConnell, D., Miller, K., Ryan, J., Summa, L., Villalobos, J. White, L., 2021, Vision and Change in the Geosciences: The Future of Undergraduate Geoscience Education: Eds. Mosher, S., Keane, C., American Geoscience Institute, 176p.

Davis, B., and Mosher, S, 2015, Complex structure and fluid flow evolution along the Grenville Front, west Texas: Geosphere, v. 11 no. 3 p. 868-898; doi:10.1130/GES01098.1

Singleton, J. S., and Mosher, S. 2012, Mylonitization in the lower plate of the Buckskin-Rawhide detachment fault, west-central Arizona: Implications for the geometric evolution of metamorphic core complexes: Journal of Structural Geology, v. 39, p. 180-198.

Mosher, S, Levine, J.S.F., and Carlson, W. D., 2008, Mesoproterozoic plate tectonics: a collisional model for the Grenville-aged orogenic belt in the Llano Uplift, central Texas: Geology, v. 36, p. 55-58.

Mosher, S., and Massell-Symons, 2008, Ridge reorientation mechanisms: Macquarie Ridge Complex, Australia-Pacific plate boundary: Geology, v. 36, p. 119-122.,

Daczko, N.R., Mosher, S., Coffin, M.F., and Meckel, T. A., 2005, Tectonic implications of fault-scarp-derived volcaniclastic deposits on Macquarie Island; sedimentation at a fossil ridge-transform intersection? Geological Society of America Bulletin, v. 117, p. 18-31.

Wertz, K., Mosher, S., Daczko, N., and Coffin, M. F., 2003, Macquarie Island’s Finch-Langdon fault: a ridge-transform inside corner structure, Geology, v. 31, p. 661-664.

Boettcher, S. S., Mosher, S., and Tosdal, R. M., 2002, Structural and tectonic evolution of Mesozoic basement-involved fold nappes and thrust faults in the Dome Rock Mountains, Arizona: in Barth, A., ed., Contributions to Crustal Evolution of the Southwestern United States: Boulder, Colorado, Geological Society of America Special Paper 365, p. 73-87.

Dalziel, I. W., Mosher, S., and Gahagan, L. M., 2000, Laurentia-Kalahari collision and the assembly of Rodinia; Journal Geology., v. 108, 9. 499-513.

Mosher, S., 1998, Tectonic evolution of the southern Laurentian Grenville orogenic belt: Geological Society of America Bulletin, v. 110, no. 11, p. 1357-1375.

Johns, M. K., and Mosher, S., 1996, Physical models of regional fold superposition: The role of competence contrast: Journal Structural Geology, v. 18, n. 4, p. 475-492

Mosher, S., and Berryhill, A. W., 1991, Structural analysis of progressive deformation within complex transcurrent shear zone systems: southern Narragansett Basin, Rhode Island: Journal Structural Geology, v. 13, p. 557-578.

Mosher, S., 1987, Pressure-solution deformation of the purgatory conglomerate, Rhode Island (U.S.A.) quantification of volume change, real strains and sedimentary shape factor: Journal Structural Geology, v. 9, no. 2, p. 221-232.

Mosher, S., 1983, Kinematic history of the Narragansett Basin, Massachusetts and Rhode Island: constraints on Late Paleozoic plate reconstructions: Tectonics, v. 2, no. 4, p. 327-344

Mosher, S., 1976, Pressure solution as a deformation mechanism in Pennsylvanian conglomerates from Rhode Island: Journal Geology, v. 84, p. 355-364.

Mosher, S., Berger, R. L., and Anderson, D. E., 1975, Fracturing characteristics of two granites: Rock Mechanics, v. 7, p. 167-176.

== Achievements and awards ==
Mosher has made several accomplishments within her academic career and has received multiple awards for her contributions to geology.

1990 - "Association of Women Geologists Outstanding Educator Award". Mosher received this award for her educational contributions and high-quality research in geoscience as a professor in the Department of Geological Sciences at the University of Texas.

2000-2001 - President of Geology Society of America (GSA)

2003 - "GSA Distinguished Service Award". Received this award for her major involvement and development of GSA.

2004 - Chair of the Council of Scientific Society Presidents

2007-2009 - Chair of Department of Geological Sciences at University of Texas

2012-2013 - American Geoscience Institute President (AGI)

2016 - Alumni Achievement Award from the University of Illinois at Champaign/Urbana Liberal Arts College, her alma mater (University of Illinois).

2020 - Marcus Milling Legendary Geoscientist. Lifetime achievement awarded to Sharon Mosher for all her achievements in Earth Sciences.
