= Denise Cox =

American petroleum geologist

- Education: Binghamton University B.S., Honours; University of Colorado, Boulder M.S.,
- Employer: Storm Energy Ltd.
- Organization: American Association of Petroleum Geologists

Denise Cox (née Mruk) is an American petroleum geologist and the former President of Storm Energy Ltd, an oil and gas exploration company based in Panama City, Florida. Cox is also a long-standing executive member of the American Association of Petroleum Geologists (AAPG) since joining the organization in 1984.

== Early life and education ==
As a high school student, Cox struggled to decide the major to pursue in college. At the advice of one of her teachers, Cox was recommended to take classes that involved the study of the Middle East, as the geographical region was expanding both in size in global economics at the time.

Cox’s studies first began at Binghamton University where she eventually graduated with a B.S. in geology in 1980. During her studies at Binghamton, Cox took a few prerequisite courses in math and science, whilst taking Arabic as an elective, which was suggested by her high school teacher. At the discretion of her Arabic professor, Cox was encouraged to pursue her interest in science and urged her to take a geology class, as the profession for geologists were in high demand. In recognizing that she would need further degrees to pursue her aspiration as a petroleum geologist, Cox enrolled at the University of Colorado Boulder where she earned her M.S., in geology in 1985.

As Cox completed her graduate studies at the University of Colorado Boulder in 1984, she worked as a Physical Science Technician with the United States Geological Survey (USGS) in New Mexico. She collaborated with colleagues on a project which evaluated the U.S. uranium supply as an energy resource. While attending a seminar in her graduate year, Cox was invited to work as a field assistant by Paul Crevello, who was a geologist at Marathon Oil and a PhD student at the time. The latter of whom was conducting research and seeking a field assistant to aid him with a project on Jurassic carbonates in Morocco in the High Atlas Mountains. Crevello was in need of a multi-lingual geologist and he saw Cox as a perfect fit, as she is fluent in English, French, and Arabic.

== Career ==
Following her completion of her M.S., at the University of Colorado Boulder in 1985, Cox joined the Marathon Oil Denver Research Center as a research geologist. Later, she transitioned as part of the company’s onshore operations to specialize in the application of reservoir technology. In 1995, Cox took part in authoring a publication for the Society of Sedimentary Geology (SEPM). During that time, she researched the geological framework, data, and tools that aided in the processive developments of conventional and unconventional reservoirs at the Yates Field reservoir in Midland, Texas.

In 1989, Cox participated in a project in collaboration with the U.S. Geological Survey at McKittrick Canyon in the Guadalupe Mountains National Park. The study she conducted primarily focused on the understanding of the canyon's petrology and topography. Her study resulted in the recognition of McKittrick Canyon's three distinct regions, each with their own set of characteristics: Captain Massive, and the Proximal and distal fore-slopes. The composition of each of these sections, particularly within the carbon and oxygen isotopes found within the canyon, led to the interpretation of the canyon's history and its significance as a geological landmark.

It was in the initial period of her career, that Cox met John Steinmetz, a Gulf Coast palaeontologist. Steinmetz acted as a mentor to Cox and guided her in a range of topics pertinent to professional development in the Petroleum Geology sector.

In 1988, Cox requested to be transferred to the Midland, Texas, production office, where she worked in the “development” sector. She gained first-hand experience in field operations and assessed the roles of each section of the company. Cox’s assessment produced a result wherein there were big gaps between different chains within the company. This assessment made her a “connector”. Later on, Cox was selected as the team leader for Midland’s first “Multidisciplinary Reservoir Characterization Project”.

Throughout her career as a geologist, Cox experienced a great deal of success as a pioneer in leading an endeavour of sustainable development within the petroleum and energy industry. After working at Marathon Oil Co. for over 20 years, Cox joined Storm Energy Ltd. in 2004.

In 2016, Cox was appointed the position of President of Storm Energy Ltd. where she remains until this day. Most notably, Cox was also the President of the American Association of Petroleum Geologists from 2020 to 2021. As of 2022, Cox stood on the executive council of the AAPG as the Vice President and treasurer. She takes on an active role as an advocate for sustainability; she consistently speaks to leaders of international communities about how to progress towards sustainable energy.
