= Critical Zone Observatories =

Interdisciplinary research project

- Abbreviation: CZO
- Formation: 2007
- Affiliations: CZEN, NSF, PRI, LTER, SoilTrEC
- Website: czo-archive.criticalzone.org/national/

Critical Zone Observatories (CZO) is an interdisciplinary collaborative research project across nine institutions with the purpose of understanding the chemical, physical, geological, and biological processes that both shape the surface of Earth and support terrestrial life. Active CZO sites include locations in Boulder Creek, Calhoun, Eel River, Intensively Managed Landscapes (IML), Jemez River Basin & Santa Catalina Mountains, Luquillo, Reynolds Creek, Susquehanna Shale Hills, and Southern Sierra.

Funded by the National Science Foundation, CZO has been working since its 2007 inception to critically engage the scientific community and increase understanding of the importance of Critical Zone science.

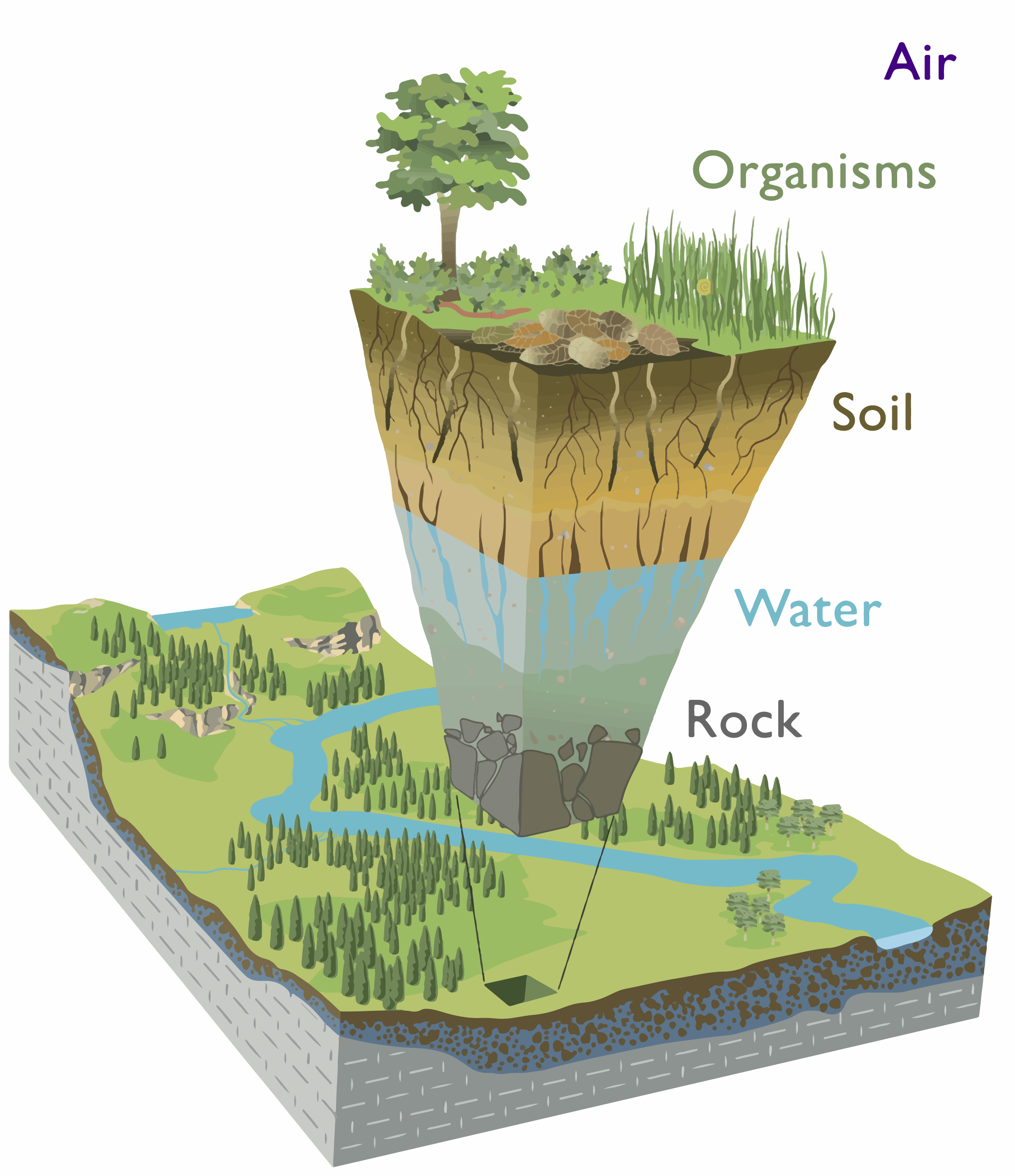
Earth's Critical Zone. Illustration by Critical Zone Observatories (CZO) based on a figure in Chorover et al. 2007.

== Mission ==
To use its institutions together to create a unique network that fosters scientific inquiry and discovery with regards to Earth's Critical Zone. Much like the interconnectedness of Earth's critical zone systems, CZO relies upon a range of disciplines, including geosciences, hydrology, microbiology, ecology, soil science, and engineering, to develop a theoretical spatial-temporal framework for critical zone evolution for both quantifiable and conceptualized data analyses.

== Education and outreach ==
Through research and education opportunities associated with each CZO, cross-CZO scientific endeavors, and annual meetings, CZO uses a variety of interfaces to communicate Critical Zone science to students and teachers.

== NSF-funded Critical Zone Observatories ==
Year Established	Critical Zone Observatory
2007	Boulder Creek CZO
2007	Susquehanna Shale Hills CZO
2007	Southern Sierra CZO
2009–2012	Christina River Basin CZO
2009	Catalina-Jemez CZO
2009	Luquillo CZO
2014	Calhoun CZO
2014	Eel River CZO
2014	Intensively Managed Landscapes (IML) CZO
2014	Reynolds Creek CZO

=== National Office ===
In 2014, a National Office branch was formalized to facilitate communication and collaboration among researchers and students, support education and outreach initiatives, coordinate data protocols and common measurements, and to provide a single point of contact for the Critical Zone Observatories.

== Critical Zone Observatories worldwide ==
There are 46 Critical Zone Observatories globally, with the majority in North America and Europe. There are 17 CZOs in Europe, 5 in Southeast Asia, 3 near Australia, 2 CZOs in Africa, and 2 in South America.

== See also ==
- Earth's critical zone
