= Gail Ashley =

American sedimentologist (born 1941)

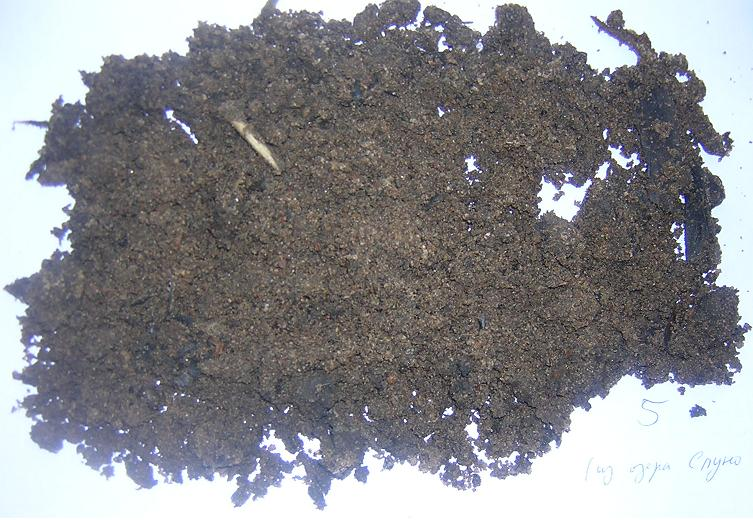
Sedimentology is the study of sediment and the process in which sediment is laid. Sediment often consists of sand, silt, and/or clay.

Gail Ashley, née Mowry, (born 29 January 1941) is an American sedimentologist. She is known for her studies of the Olduvai Gorge sediments, focused on the water supplies available to hominids and the paleoclimate of the region. She has participated in multi-disciplinary projects that include meteorology, oceanography, paleoanthropology, and archaeology. She has served in professional organizations in the fields of sedimentology and geology, including the presidency of the Geological Society of America, the second woman to hold that post.

== Early life and education ==
Ashley was born Gail Mowry in Leominster, Massachusetts, on January 29, 1941. Her interest in geology developed at a young age under the tutelage of a neighbor and professor of geology. She earned a bachelor's degree in 1963 and a master's degree in 1972, both in geology, from the University of Massachusetts, Amherst. In 1977 Ashley received a Ph.D. from the University of British Columbia for research on sediment transport in tidal rivers.

== Research career ==
In 1977, Ashley was hired at Rutgers University, where she currently serves as a full professor. She has served as editor for several journals, including as the first female editor of the Journal of Sedimentary Research and the Geological Society of America Bulletin. She presented a lecture on "The Paleoclimate Framework of Human Evolution, Lessons from Olduvai Gorge, Tanzania" at Rutgers, publicized by WISE (Women in Scientific Education) in 2014.

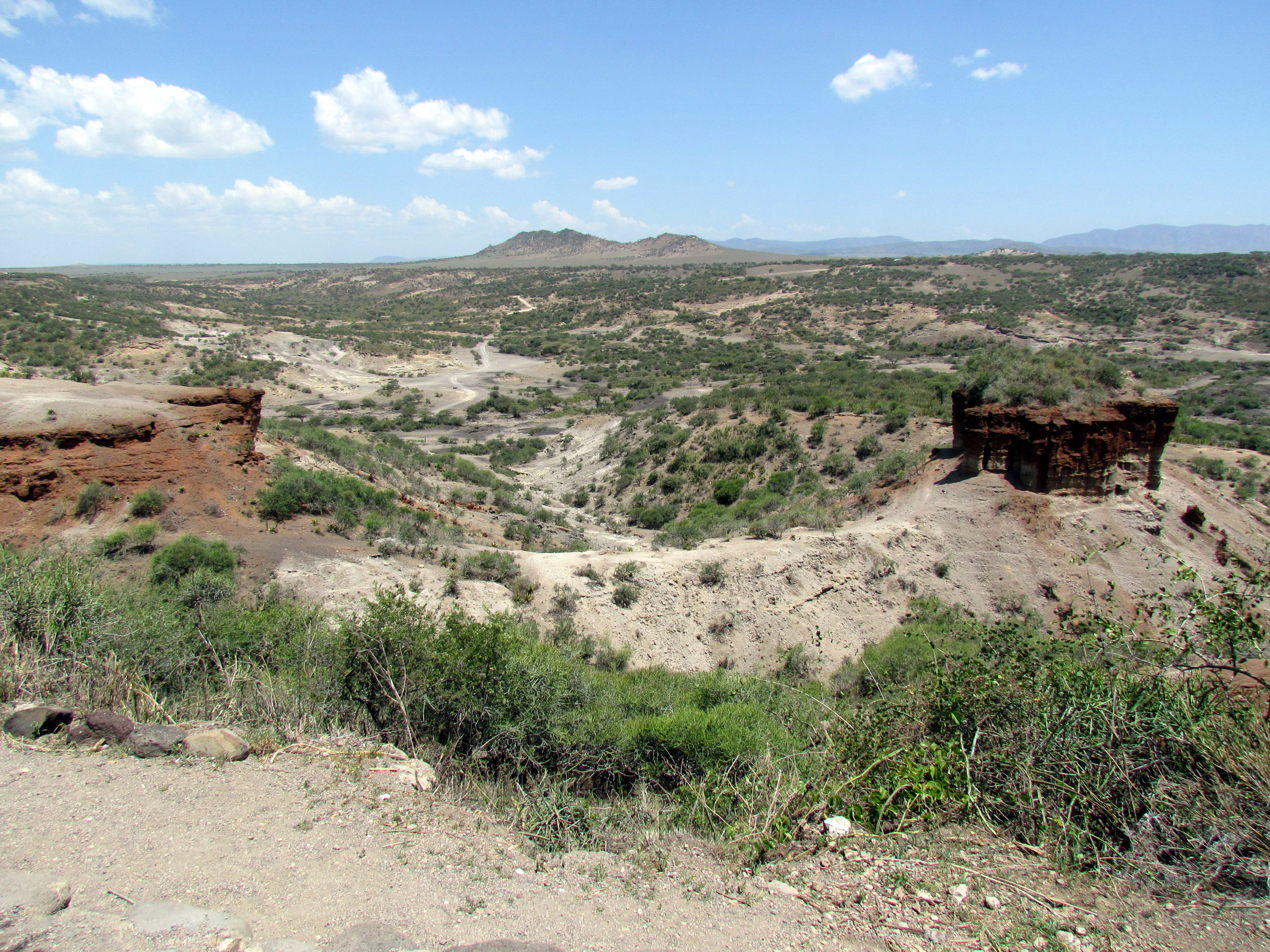
The Olduvai Gorge, where the majority of Gail Ashley's research and study took place.

Ashley's research career has focused on glaciation and paleoecology.

In 1998, she first introduced the term Critical Zone in Earth sciences to describe this thin zone of complex interactions involving rock, soil, water, air, and living organisms.

== Honors and awards ==
From 1991 to 1992, Ashley was the president of the Society of Economic Paleontologists and Mineralogists and chaired the Northeast Section of the Geological Society of America (GSA). She is active in the Association for Women Geoscientists to bring more women into scientific fields. From 1998 to 1999, she presided over the GSA and was the second female president in its history. From 1998 to 2002 she served as vice president of the International Association of Sedimentologists.

In 2012, Ashley was the recipient of the GSA's Laurence L. Sloss Award for lifetime achievements and in 2020 received the GSA Limnogeology Division Israel C. Russell Award.

== Personal life ==
Ashley has two children with her first husband, Stuart Ashley. She is currently married to Jeremy Delaney.
