= United States Geological Survey =

Scientific agency of the US government

- Seal of the United States Geological Survey

- Official identifier of the U.S. Geological Survey

- Flag of the United States Geological Survey

Agency overview
- Formed: March 3, 1879; 147 years ago (as Geological Survey)
- Jurisdiction: United States
- Headquarters: John W. Powell National Center Reston, Virginia, U.S.; 38.9470°N 77.3675°W
- Employees: 8,670 (2009)
- Annual budget: $1.497 billion (FY2023)
- Agency executive: Ned Mamula, Director
- Parent agency: United States Department of the Interior
- Website: www.usgs.gov

The United States Geological Survey (USGS), founded as the Geological Survey, is an agency of the United States Department of the Interior whose work spans the disciplines of biology, geography, geology, and hydrology. The agency was founded on March 3, 1879, to study the landscape of the United States, its natural resources, and the natural hazards that threaten it. The agency also makes maps of planets and moons, based on data from U.S. space probes.

The sole scientific agency of the U.S. Department of the Interior, USGS is a fact-finding research organization with no regulatory responsibility. It is headquartered in Reston, Virginia, with major offices near Lakewood, Colorado; at the Denver Federal Center; and in NASA Research Park in California. In 2009, it employed about 8,670 people.

The current motto of the USGS, in use since August 1997, is "science for a changing world". The agency's previous slogan, adopted on its hundredth anniversary, was "Earth Science in the Public Service".

== History ==
=== Prior Surveys ===
In the early-1800s, geological surveys were conducted by states and private individuals to support agriculture as a result of westward migration after the War of 1812. The first Federal survey was conducted in 1834 by George William Featherstonhaugh under the Topographical Bureau of the U.S. Army Corps of Engineers to create a geological map of the United States. This was followed by other geological explorations like the United States Exploring Expedition and the establishment of the Corps of Topographical Engineers led by John James Abert. As minerals like gold were being discovered in the west, land surveys became necessary as part of Manifest destiny. As a result, various states set up geological survey institutions in the mid-1800s, e.g., the Kentucky Geological Survey, established in 1854.

On March 2, 1867, Congress authorized explorations focused on the geology along the Transcontinental railroad under the U.S. Army Corps of Engineers led by Clarence King and a survey of the natural resources of Nebraska under the General Land Office led by Ferdinand Vandeveer Hayden. The explorations led to the creation of the United States Geological and Geographical Survey of the Territories which included surveys led by John Wesley Powell (Powell Geographic Expedition of 1869) and George Wheeler (Wheeler Survey). Hayden also received funding for the Hayden Geological Survey of 1871.

=== Creation ===
In 1879, a National Academy of Sciences report suggested the creation of an agency dedicated to the study of geology and environmental resources on public domain. This agency would be distinct from the existing Coast and Geodetic Survey, which would focus on measurements of geodesy instead of geology.

The report prompted Congress to establish the USGS as a last-minute amendment to a sundry appropriations bill on March 3, 1879. The Organic Act of 1879 was signed into law by President Rutherford B. Hayes and established the Director of the U.S. Geological Survey under the Department of the Interior, it charged the new agency with the "classification of the public lands, and examination of the geological structure, mineral resources, and products of the national domain." The legislation also discontinued the existing surveys led by Hayden, Powell, and Wheeler on June 30, 1879.

The earliest responsibilities of the USGS was to survey and classify public lands for the existence of minerals following the Land Ordinance of 1785. At the time, the government owned 1.2 billion acres of land as a result of the Louisiana Purchase and the Mexican–American War, yet only 200 million acres were surveyed. Clarence King was appointed as the first director of USGS, assembling the new organization from disparate regional survey agencies. He focused on economic development for mining in the west, and resigned to pursue opportunities in the mining industry. After two years, King was succeeded by John Wesley Powell, who expanded the mission of the agency.

== Organizational structure ==
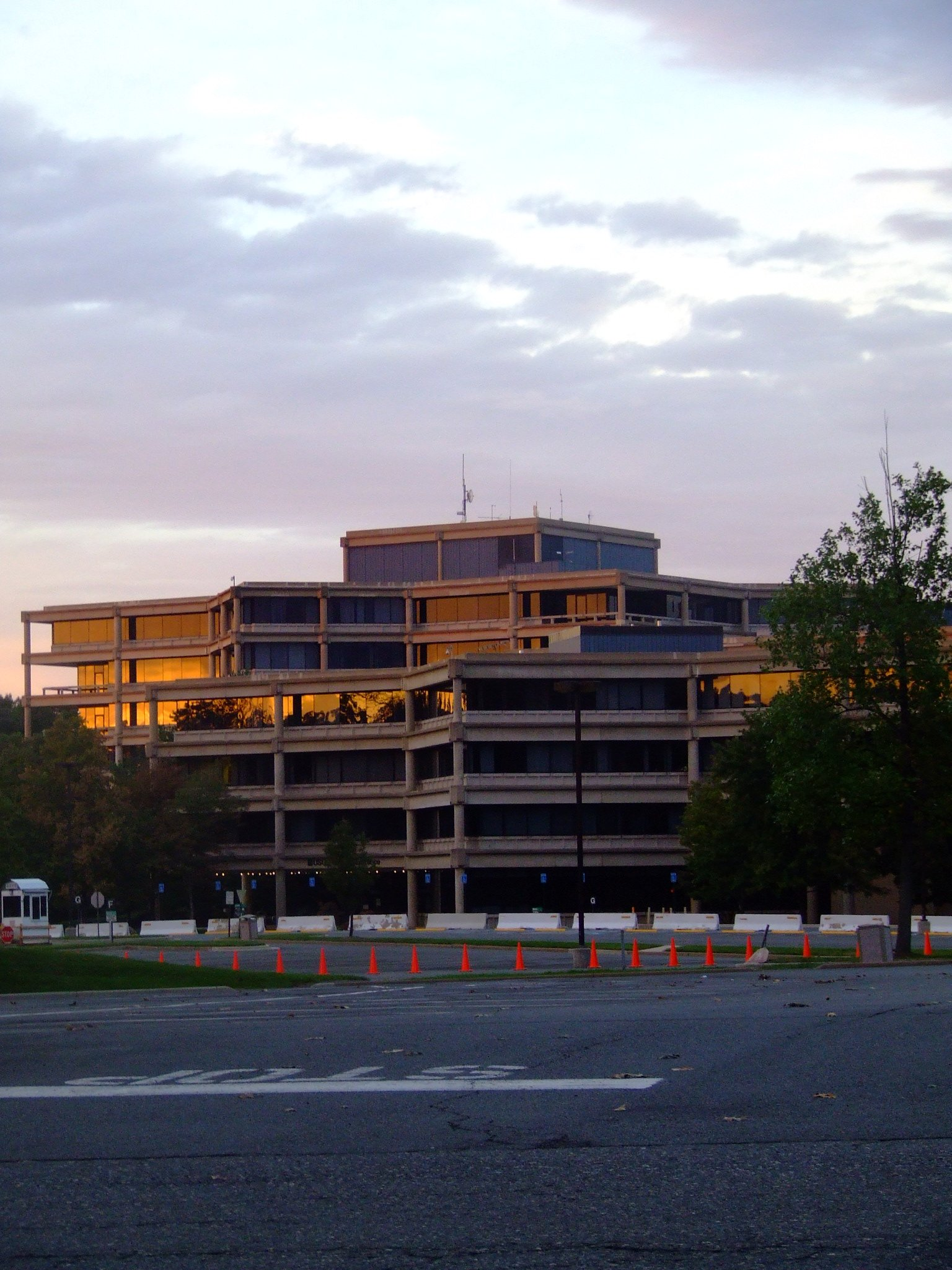
U.S. Geological Survey National Center in Reston, Virginia

The USGS is led by the Director which is appointed by the President with the consent of the Senate. The Director is not allowed to have personal or private interests in the lands being surveyed, and is not allowed to survey for private parties or corporations. The agency is headquartered in Reston, Virginia within the USGS National Center.

Science research is split into five "Mission Areas" that are aligned with themes in the USGS Science Strategy. This allows research to be interdisciplinary and groups science programs under a broad category. Each Mission Area is led by an Associate Director that reports directly to the Director.

Specific science research is further broken down into seven geographical regions which are led by Regional Directors that report to the Deputy Director of Operations. The regions are aligned with the Department of the Interior Unified Regions. Administrative services are centralized and report to the Deputy Director of Administration and Policy.

=== Regions ===
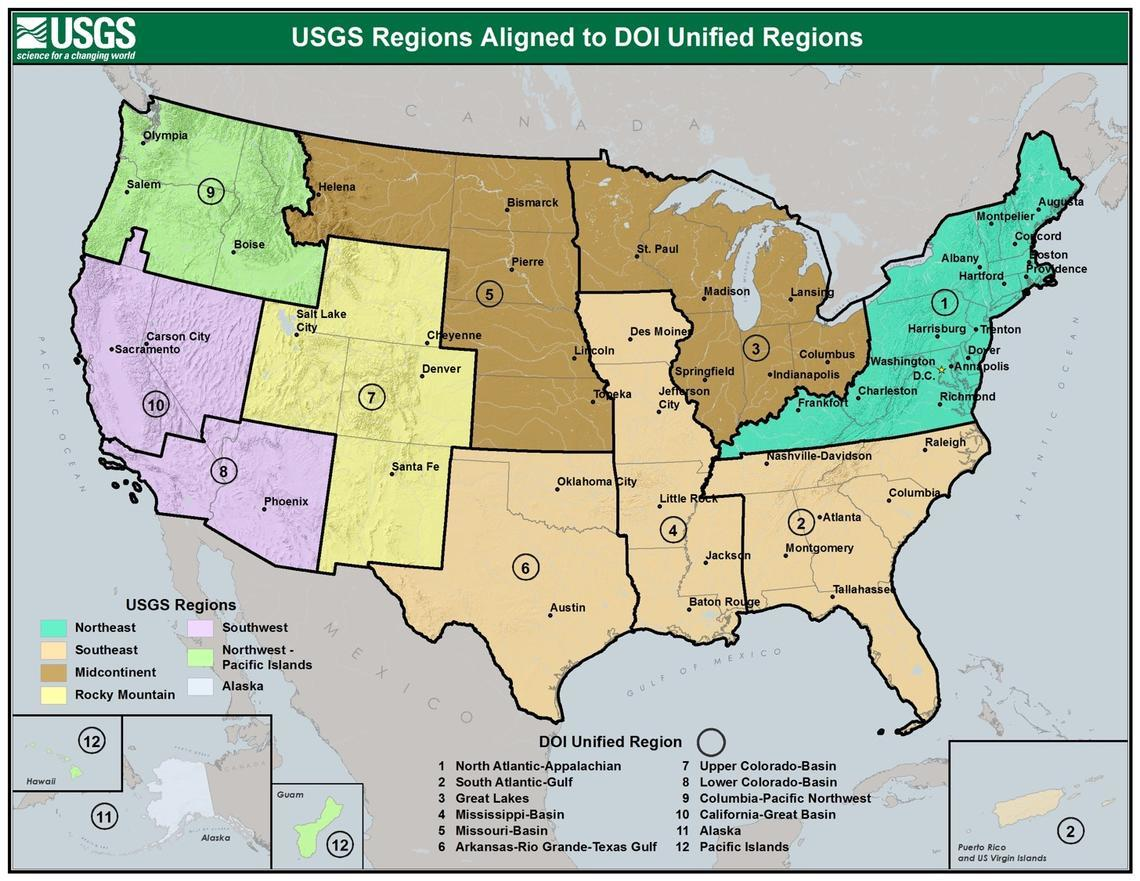
The USGS regions of the United States

Each of the seven regions has a field office which focuses on research specific to that region's geography and conditions, supporting science programs and facilities located within each region.

- Region 1: Northeast
- Region 2: Southeast
- Region 3: Midcontintent
- Region 4: Rocky Mountain
- Region 5: Southwest
- Region 6: Northwest-Pacific Islands
- Region 7: Alaska

=== Mission Areas ===
The five Mission Areas categorize research into topics each with individual programs and facilities.

==== Core Science Systems ====
The Core Science Systems Mission Area is the fundamental research division for everything in the Earth's critical zone. Its activities focus on structural geology, geomorphology, geophysics, and geography. In addition to evaluating land through remote sensing, as well as analyzing evolutionary biology and biogeography. The work is supported by computer science and aims to distribute data through maps or other mediums as foundation for all other Mission Areas. The Mission Area is formed around a "Modular Science Framework" with the goal of contributing to the Digital Earth.

The programs under the Core Science Systems Mission Area include:

- National Geospatial Program: Responsible for topographic mapping through management of The National Map, United States Board on Geographic Names, and the Geographic Names Information System.
- National Cooperative Geologic Mapping Program: Responsible for geologic mapping through the National Geologic Map Database.
- Gap Analysis Project
- National Geological and Geophysical Data Preservation Program
- National Land Imaging Program: Manages remote sensing research through missions like Landsat.
- Science Synthesis, Analysis, and Research Program

The science centers under the Core Science Systems Mission Area include:

- Center of Excellence for Geospatial Information Science
- Earth Resources Observation and Science Center
- National Geospatial Technical Operations Center
- National Ice Core Laboratory
- Core Research Center
- USGS Library

==== Ecosystems ====
===== Climate Adaptation Science Centers =====
The National and regional Climate Adaptation Science Centers (CASCs) is a partnership-driven program that teams scientific researchers with natural and cultural resource managers to help fish, wildlife, waters, and lands across the country adapt to climate change. The National CASC (NCASC), based at USGS headquarters in Reston, Virginia, serves as the national office for the CASC network, while nine regional CASCs comprising federal-university consortiums located across the U.S., U.S. Pacific Islands, and U.S. Caribbean deliver science that addresses resource management priorities of the states within their footprints.

===== National Wildlife Health Center =====
The USGS also operates the National Wildlife Health Center, whose mission is "to serve the nation and its natural resources by providing sound science and technical support, and to disseminate information to promote science-based decisions affecting wildlife and ecosystem health. The NWHC provides information, technical assistance, research, education, and leadership on national and international wildlife health issues." It is the agency primarily responsible for surveillance of H5N1 avian influenza outbreaks in the United States. The USGS also runs 17 biological research centers in the United States, including the Patuxent Wildlife Research Center.

==== Geology, Energy, and Minerals ====
===== Geochronology =====
In collaboration with Stanford University, the USGS operates the USGS-Stanford Ion Microprobe Laboratory, an analytical facility for U-(Th)-Pb geochronology and trace element analyses of minerals and other earth materials.

==== Natural Hazards ====
The programs under the Natural Hazards Mission Area include:

===== Earthquake Hazards Program =====
Earthquake animations from May 16 to May 22, 2010

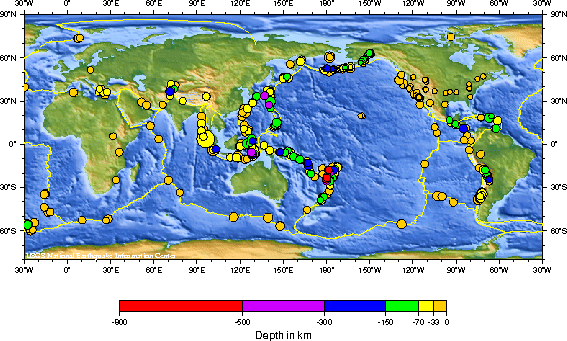
Earthquakes around the world from April 23 to May 23, 2010

The Earthquake Hazards Program monitors earthquake activity worldwide. The National Earthquake Information Center (NEIC) in Golden, Colorado, on the campus of the Colorado School of Mines detects the location and magnitude of global earthquakes. The USGS also runs or supports several regional monitoring networks in the United States under the umbrella of the Advanced National Seismic System (ANSS). The USGS informs authorities, emergency responders, the media, and the public, both domestic and worldwide, about significant earthquakes. It maintains long-term archives of earthquake data for scientific and engineering research. It also conducts and supports research on long-term seismic hazards. USGS has released the UCERF California earthquake forecast.

===== ShakeMaps =====
The USGS is investigating collaboration with the social networking site Twitter to allow for more rapid construction of ShakeMaps. ShakeMaps are an interactive tool allowing users to visually observe the distribution and severity of shaking resulting from earthquakes.

===== Volcano Hazards Program =====
As of 2005, the agency is working to create a National Volcano Early Warning System by improving the instrumentation monitoring the 169 volcanoes in U.S. territory and by establishing methods for measuring the relative threats posed at each site.

The USGS also operates five volcano observatories throughout the nation: the Alaska Volcano Observatory (covering volcanoes in Alaska and the Northern Mariana Islands) in Anchorage, Alaska (on the campus of Alaska Pacific University); the California Volcano Observatory in Menlo Park, California; the Cascades Volcano Observatory (covering volcanoes in Idaho, Oregon, and Washington) in Vancouver, Washington; the Hawaiian Volcano Observatory (covering volcanoes in Hawaii and American Samoa) in Hilo, Hawaii; and the Yellowstone Volcano Observatory (covering volcanoes in Arizona, Colorado, Montana, New Mexico, Utah, and Wyoming) in Yellowstone National Park, Wyoming.

The Volcano Disaster Assistance Program helps developing countries experiencing volcanic eruptions through response, capacity building, training, and volcano research. The program is based out of the Cascades Volcano Observatory.

===== Coastal and Marine Hazards and Resources Program =====
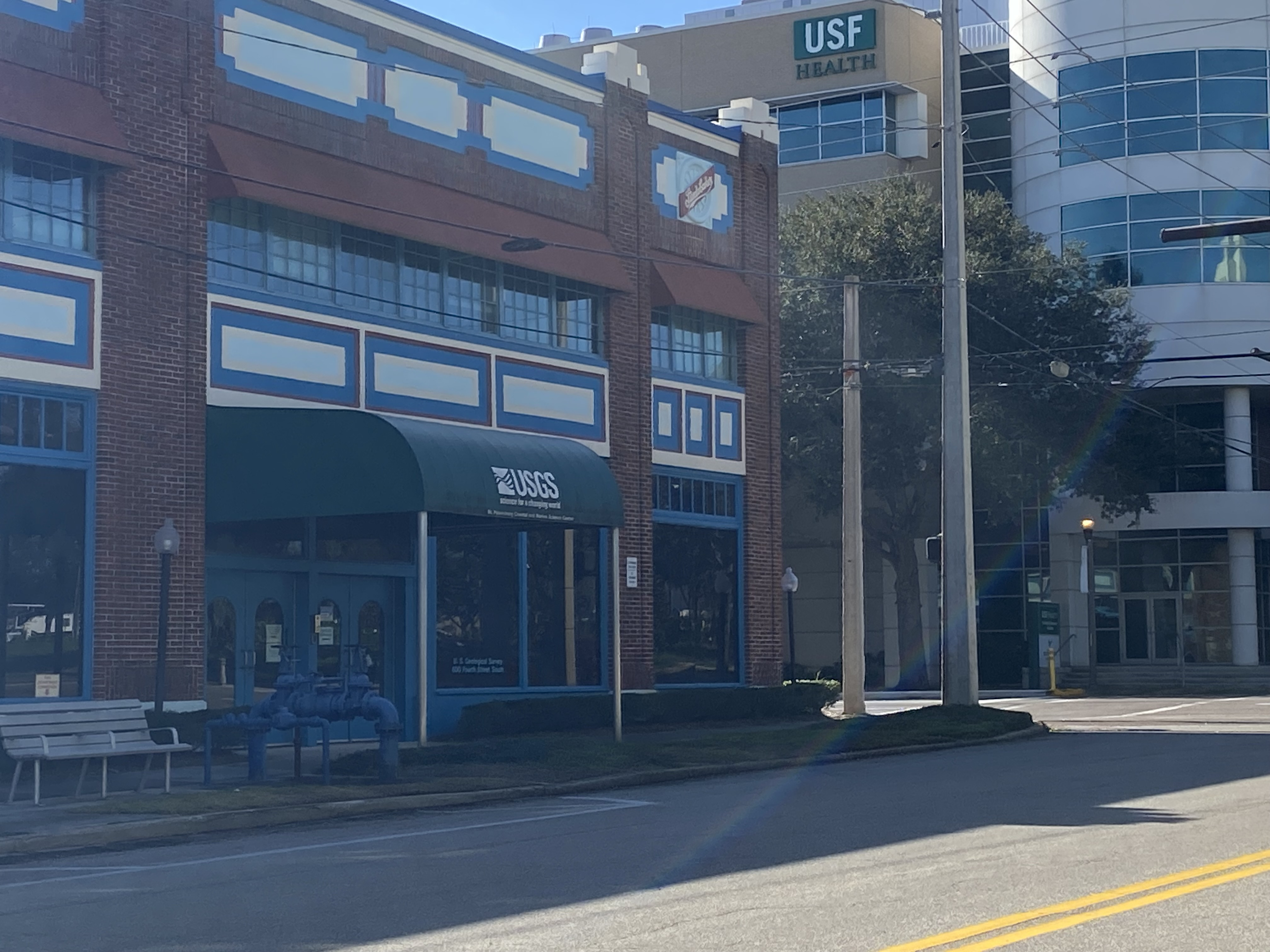
USGS St. Petersburg Coastal and Marine Science Center, USF St. Petersburg campus

The USGS Coastal and Marine Hazards and Resources Program (formerly the USGS Coastal and Marine Geology Program) has three major science centers one located in Woods Hole, Massachusetts, one located in Santa Cruz, California and one located in St. Petersburg, Florida. The goal of this program is to conduct a wide variety of research in coastal and marine environments to support scientific understanding, develop tools and technology, and provide maps, data, and other information needed by resource managers and decision-makers.

===== National Geomagnetism Program =====
The USGS National Geomagnetism Program monitors the magnetic field at magnetic observatories and distributes magnetometer data in real time.

==== Water Resources ====
===== Streamflow programs =====
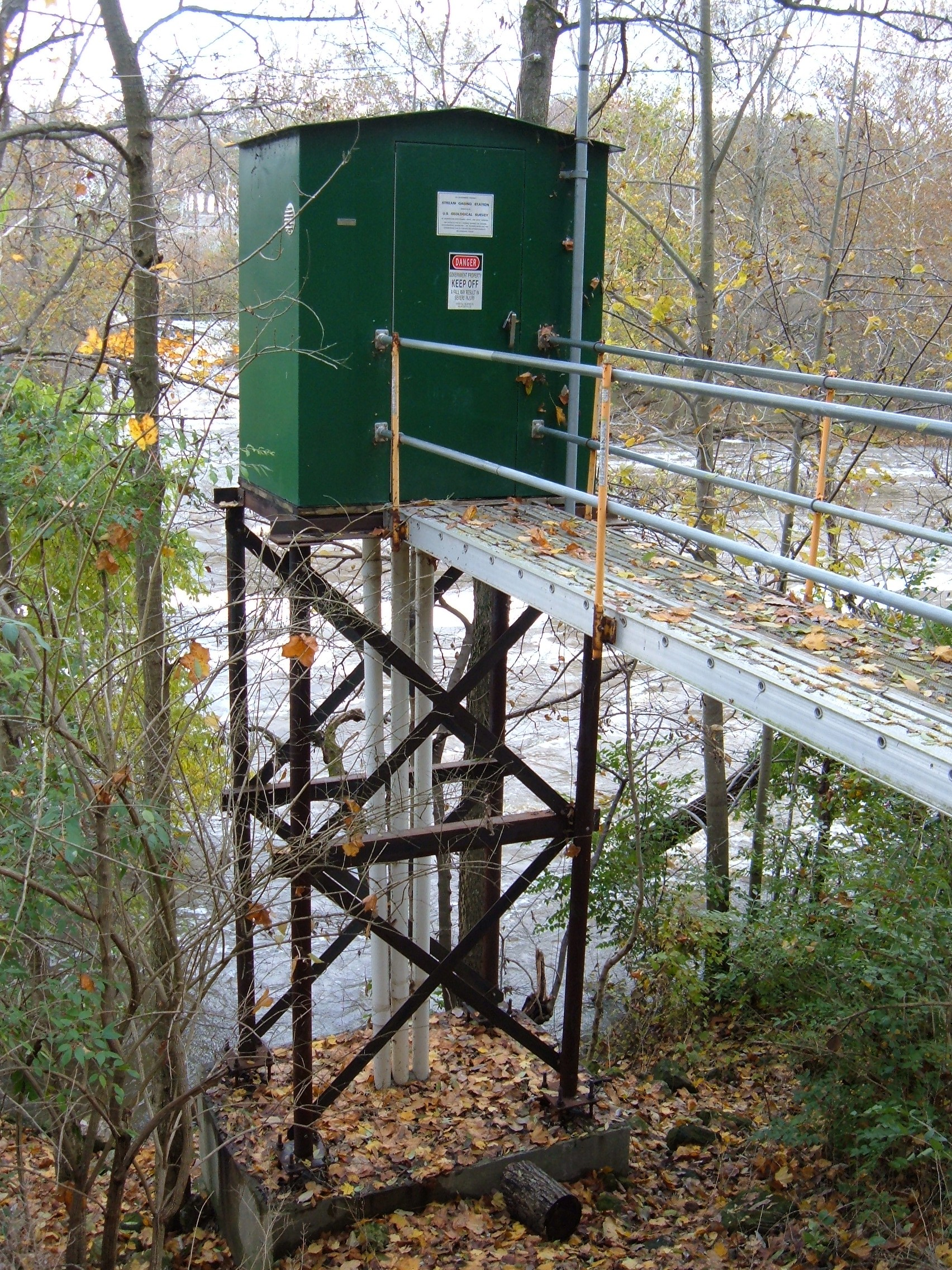
A USGS gauging station on the Scioto River below O'Shaughnessy Dam near Dublin, Ohio

The USGS operates a number of water-related programs including:

- the streamgauging network for the United States, with over 7400 stream gauges. Real-time streamflow data is available online.
- the National Streamflow Information Program
- National Water-Quality Assessment Program. USGS water data is publicly available from their National Water Information System database.

===== Water Resources Research Institute =====
As part of the Water Resources Research Act of 1984, the State Water Resources Research Act Program created a Water Resources Research Institute (WRRI) in each state, along with Washington DC, Puerto Rico, the US Virgin Islands, and Guam. Together, these institutes make up the National Institutes for Water Resources (NIWR). The institutes focus on water-related issues through research, training and collaboration.

=== Other Centers and Divisions ===
==== North American Environmental Atlas ====
The USGS collaborates with Canadian and Mexican government scientists, along with the Commission for Environmental Cooperation, to produce the North American Environmental Atlas, which is used to depict and track environmental issues for a continental perspective

==== Astrogeology ====
Since 1962, the Astrogeology Research Program has been involved in global, lunar, and planetary exploration and mapping.

== Select activities ==
=== Topographic mapping ===
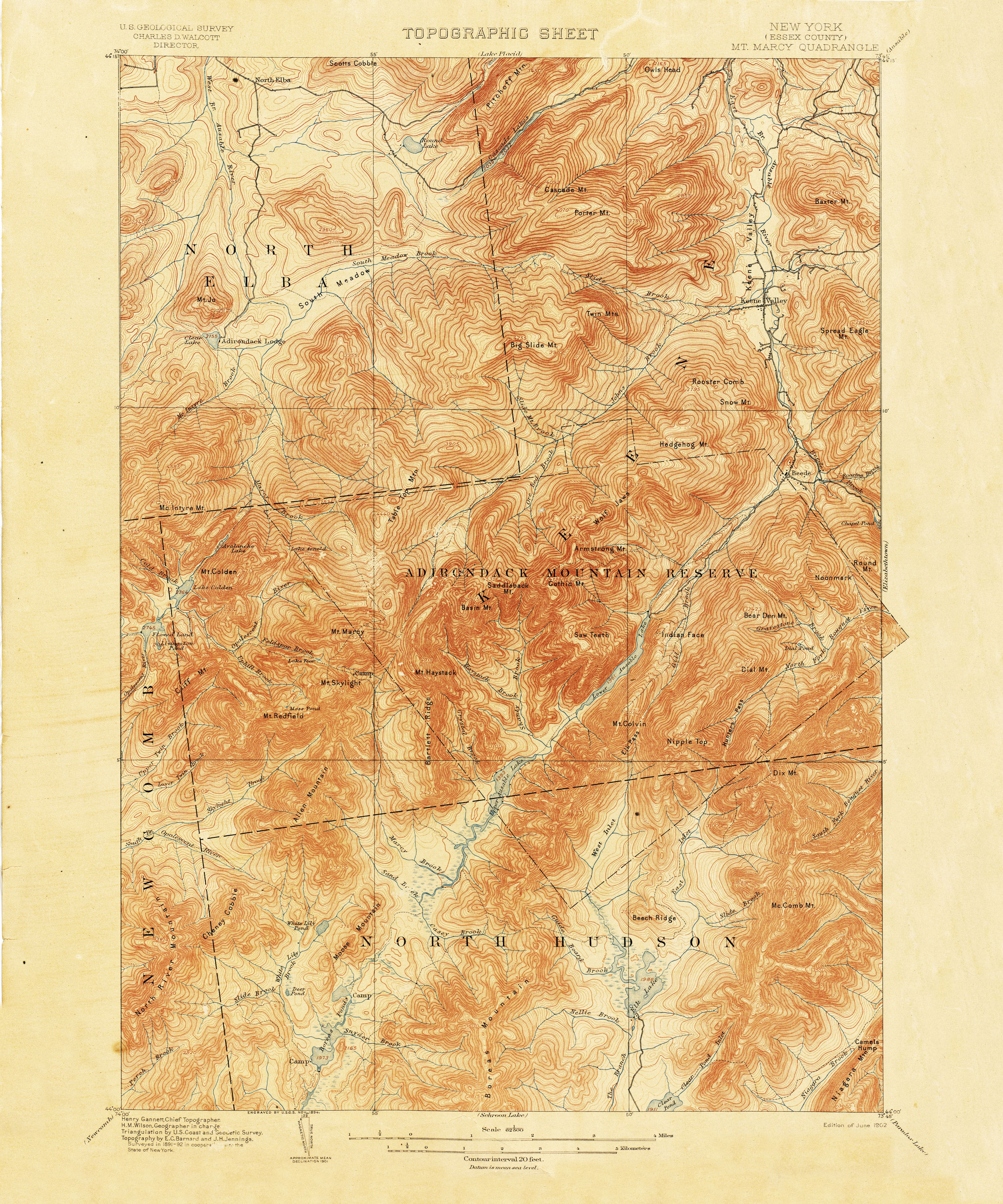
An 1892 15-minute map of Mount Marcy in the Adirondacks in New York State from the late 19th century

The USGS produces several national series of topographic maps which vary in scale and extent, with some wide gaps in coverage, notably the absence of 1:50,000 scale topographic maps or their equivalent. The largest (both in terms of scale and quantity) and best-known topographic series is the 7.5-minute, 1:24,000 scale, quadrangle, a non-metric scale most common to the United States. Each of these maps covers an area bounded by two lines of latitude and two lines of longitude spaced 7.5 minutes apart. Nearly 57,000 individual maps in this series cover the 48 contiguous states, Hawaii, U.S. territories, and areas of Alaska near Anchorage, Fairbanks, and Prudhoe Bay. The area covered by each map varies with the latitude of its represented location due to convergence of the meridians. At lower latitudes, near 30° north, a 7.5-minute quadrangle contains an area of about 64 square miles (166 km^{2}). At 49° north latitude, 49 square miles (127 km^{2}) are contained within a quadrangle of that size. As a unique non-metric map scale, the 1:24,000 scale requires a separate and specialized romer scale for plotting map positions.

The last USGS paper topographic maps were published in 2006, and were replaced by The National Map in 2019 (not to be confused with the National Atlas of the United States produced by the Department of the Interior, one of whose bureaus is USGS).

An older series of maps, the 15-minute series, was once used to map the contiguous 48 states at a scale of 1:62,500 for maps covering the continental United States, but was discontinued during the last quarter of the twentieth century. Each map was bounded by two parallels and two meridians spaced 15 minutes apart—the same area covered by four maps in the 7.5-minute series. Alaska formerly was mapped using the 15-minute series, which was replaced by maps at 1:25,000 scale in 2017. Nearly 3,000 maps cover 97% of the state.

The final regular quadrangle series produced by the USGS is the 1:250,000 scale topographic series. Each of these quadrangles in the conterminous United States measures 1 degree of latitude by 2 degrees of longitude. This series was produced by the U.S. Army Map Service in the 1950s, prior to the maps in the larger-scale series, and consists of 489 sheets, each covering an area ranging from 8,218 square miles (21,285 km^{2}) at 30° north to 6,222 square miles (16,115 km^{2}) at 49° north. Hawaii is mapped at this scale in quadrangles measuring 1° by 1°.

USGS topographic quadrangle maps are marked with grid lines and tics around the map collar which make it possible to identify locations on the map by several methods, including the graticule measurements of longitude and latitude, the township and section method within the Public Land Survey System, and cartesian coordinates in both the State Plane Coordinate System and the Universal Transverse Mercator coordinate system.

Other specialty maps have been produced by the USGS at a variety of scales. These include county maps, maps of special interest areas, such as the national parks, and areas of scientific interest.

A number of Internet sites have made these maps available on the web for affordable commercial and professional use. Because works of the U.S. government are in the public domain, it is also possible to find many of these maps for free at various locations on the Internet. Georeferenced map images are available from the USGS as digital raster graphics (DRGs) in addition to digital data sets based on USGS maps, notably digital line graphs (DLGs) and digital elevation models (DEMs).

In 2015, the USGS unveiled the topoView website, a new way to view their entire digitized collection of over 178,000 maps from 1884 to 2006. The site is an interactive map of the United States that allows users to search or move around the map to find the USGS collection of maps for a specific area. Users may then view the maps in great detail and download them if desired.

==== The National Map and U.S. Topo ====
In 2008, the USGS abandoned traditional methods of surveying, revising, and updating topographic maps based on aerial photography and field checks. Today's U.S. Topo quadrangle (1:24,000) maps are mass-produced, using automated and semi-automated processes, with cartographic content supplied from the National GIS Database. In the two years from June 2009 to May 2011, the USGS produced nearly 40,000 maps, more than 80 maps per work day. Only about two hours of interactive work are spent on each map, mostly on text placement and final inspection; there are essentially no field checks or field inspections to confirm map details.

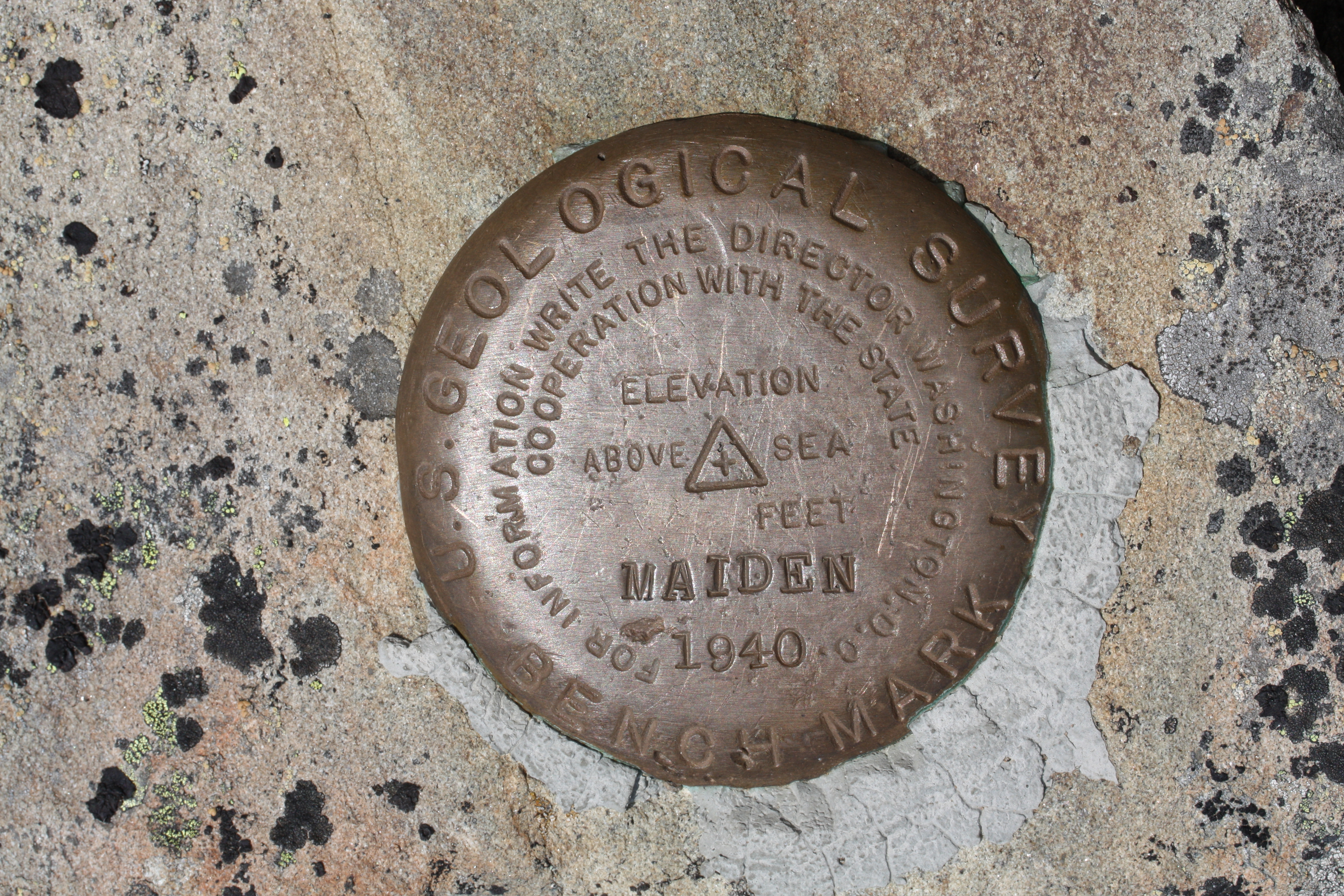
United States Geological Survey marker on the summit of Maiden Peak (Washington)

While much less expensive to compile and produce, the revised digital U.S. topo maps have been criticized for a lack of accuracy and detail in comparison to older generation maps based on aerial photo surveys and field checks. As the digital databases were not designed for producing general-purpose maps, data integration can be a problem when retrieved from sources with different resolutions and collection dates. Human-made features once recorded by direct field observation are not in any public domain national database and are frequently omitted from the newest generation digital topo maps, including windmills, mines and mineshafts, water tanks, fence lines, survey marks, parks, recreational trails, buildings, boundaries, pipelines, telephone lines, power transmission lines, and even railroads. As a result, some have noted that the U.S. Topo maps currently fall short of traditional topographic map presentation standards achieved in maps drawn from 1945 to 1992.

=== USGS Hydrologic Instrumentation Facility ===
The Hydrologic Instrumentation Facility (HIF) has four sections within its organizational structure; the Field Services Section which includes the warehouse, repair shop, and Engineering Unit; the Testing Section which includes the Hydraulic Laboratory, testing chambers, and Water Quality Laboratory; the Information Technology Section which includes computer support and the Drafting Unit; and the Administrative Section.

The HIF was given national responsibility for the design, testing, evaluation, repair, calibration, warehousing, and distribution of hydrologic instrumentation. Distribution is accomplished by direct sales and through a rental program. The HIF supports data collection activities through centralized warehouse and laboratory facilities. The HIF warehouse provides hydrologic instruments, equipment, and supplies for USGS as well as Other Federal Agencies (OFA) and USGS Cooperators. The HIF also tests, evaluates, repairs, calibrates, and develops hydrologic equipment and instruments. The HIF Hydraulic Laboratory facilities include a towing tank, jet tank, pipe flow facility, and tilting flume. In addition, the HIF provides training and technical support for the equipment it stocks.

The Engineering Group seeks out new technology and designs for instrumentation that can work more efficiently, be more accurate, and or be produced at a lower cost than existing instrumentation. HIF works directly with vendors to help them produce products that will meet the mission needs of the USGS. For instrument needs not currently met by a vendor, the Engineering Group designs, tests, and issues contracts to have HIF-designed equipment made. Sometimes HIF will patent a new design in the hope that instrument vendors will buy the rights and mass-produce the instrument at a lower cost to everyone.

== USGS publications ==
USGS researchers publish the results of their science in a variety of ways, including peer-reviewed scientific journals as well as in one of a variety of USGS Report Series that include preliminary results, maps, data, and final results. A complete catalog of all USGS publications is available from the USGS Publications Warehouse.

== See also ==
- Alaska Volcano Observatory
- California earthquake forecast
- Cascades Volcano Observatory
- Hawaiian Volcano Observatory
- List of national mapping agencies
- National Lidar Dataset (United States)
- QuakeSim
- Timeline of environmental history
- Variscale ruler
- Volcano Disaster Assistance Program
- Water Resource Region
