= QuakeSim =

NASA earthquake modeling project

QuakeSim is a NASA project for modeling earthquake fault systems. It was started in 2001 with NASA funding as a follow-up to the General Earthquake Models (GEM) initiative. The multi-scale nature of earthquakes requires integrating data types and models to fully simulate and understand the earthquake process. QuakeSim is a computational framework for modeling and understanding earthquake and tectonic processes.

QuakeSim focuses on modeling interseismic process though various boundary element, finite element, and analytical applications, which run on various platforms, including desktop and high-end computers. The QuakeTables database allows for modelers to access geological and geophysical data. A goal of QuakeSim is to develop significant improvements in earthquake forecast quality, thereby mitigating the danger from this natural hazard.

== QuakeSim Portal ==
The QuakeSim Portal allows for users to access and ingest data into models and simulations. It provides the computational infrastructure for the entire project. QuakeSim users can create an account and interact with different data and software through the portal. The QuakeSim Portal consists of portlets that include:

- Facilities for accessing real-time and archival GPS data
- Time series analysis tools, including ST_Filter and RDAHMM
- Mesh generation and viscoelastic finite element simulation tools (GeoFEST)
- Okada-based elastic fault modeling methods (Disloc, which is a forward model, and Simplex for inverting geodetic data).

== QuakeTables ==
QuakeTables is the database used to access information for QuakeSim. Information found in the QuakeTables includes:

- Paleoseismic fault data
- Global Positioning System (GPS) surface deformation data
- Seismicity data
- Processed Interferometric Synthetic Aperture Radar (InSAR) Interferograms from existing satellites

This information plays a big role in the process of forecasting and damage mitigation. The information allows for the creation of simulations and data mining. This then improves the prediction for potential earthquakes. This, along with attenuation modeling and site effects, leads to a better understanding of probable ground motion, allowing for the opportunity to improve structural response.

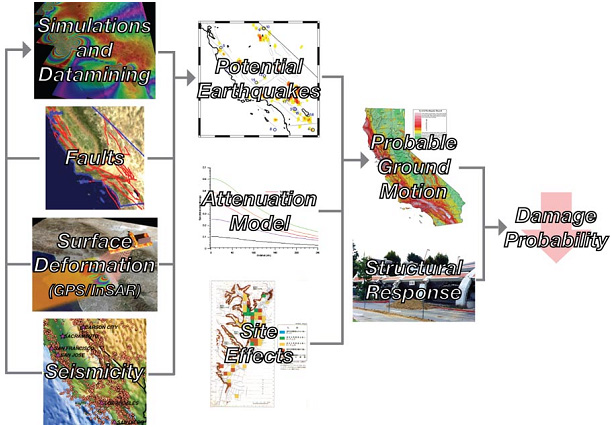
Figure 1. Process for estimating damage probability

== Developed Software ==
QuakeSim includes several applications. GeoFEST, PARK, and Virtual California are used to model different aspects of the earthquake cycle.

== QuakeSim-related NASA missions ==
QuakeSim utilizes GPS data from NASA, the National Science Foundation, and the US Geological Survey Southern California Integrated GPS Network (SCIGN). QuakeSim was also establishing the computational infrastructure for the planned NASA DESDynI (Deformation, Ecosystem Structure, and Dynamics of Ice) mission, which was cancelled in 2012. DESDynI (pronounced destiny) would fly InSAR and LIDAR instruments for studying hazards and global environmental change.

== Affiliates ==
- NASA Jet Propulsion Laboratory (lead)
- Brown University
- Indiana University
- NASA Ames
- University of California, Davis
- University of California, Irvine
- University of Southern California
