= Tsakalotos =

Tsakalotos is a Greek surname. It is the surname of:

- Euclid Tsakalotos (born 1960), current Greek Minister of Finance
- Thrasyvoulos Tsakalotos (1897–1989), former Chief of the Hellenic Army General Staff
- Dimitrios Tsakalotos (1883–1919), a Greek professor of chemistry.
