= Frank Hawthorne =

Canadian mineralogist and crystallographer (born 1946)

Frank Hawthorne CC FRSC
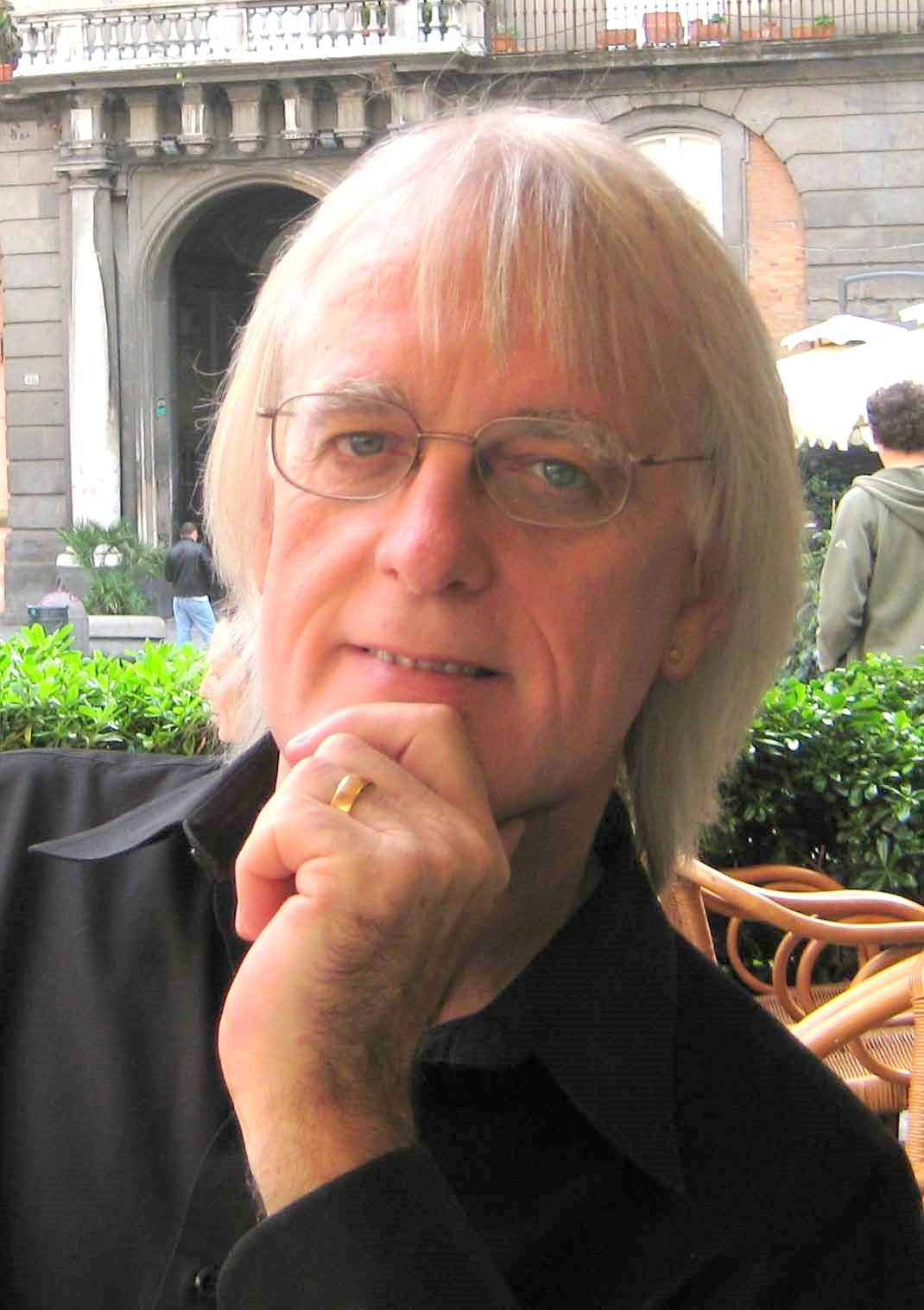
- Hawthorne in 2010
- Born: Frank Christopher Hawthorne; 8 January 1946 (age 80); Bristol, England
- Education: Imperial College London; McMaster University
- Awards: Order of Canada; Roebling Medal (2013)
- Scientific career
- Fields: Mineralogy and crystallography
- Workplaces: University of Manitoba
- Website: frankhawthorne.com

Frank Christopher Hawthorne CC FRSC (born 8 January 1946) is an English-born Canadian mineralogist, crystallographer and spectroscopist. He works at the University of Manitoba and is currently distinguished professor emeritus. By combining graph theory, bond-valence theory and the moments approach to the electronic energy density of solids he has developed bond topology as a rigorous approach to understanding the atomic arrangements, chemical compositions and paragenesis of complex oxide and oxysalt minerals.

== Formal education ==
Frank C. Hawthorne was born in Bristol, England, on 8 January 1946, to Audrey Patricia (née Miles) and Frank Hawthorne, and went to Begbrook Primary School (now Begbrook Primary Academy) and Bishop Road Primary School, Bristol. In 1956, he moved to Maidenhead, Berkshire, and went to Maidenhead County Boys School (later Maidenhead Grammar School, now Desborough College) where he focused on Mathematics, Physics and Geography, played rugby, hockey, cricket, and did athletics (track and field). He was captured by Physical Geography and at the age of 15, decided to become a geologist. He played rugby for Thames Valley (later Maidenhead) Rugby Club and cricket for the village of Cookham Dean. From late 1962 onward, he was exposed to early English rock-and-roll at pubs and clubs on the periphery of London and became a lifelong enthusiast of this form of music. In 1964, he entered Imperial College London to study Pure Geology, play rugby, hockey and cricket, and drink the occasional pint of beer. He became interested in hard-rock geology and his B.Sc. thesis work, 3 months on the island of Elba in the Mediterranean, convinced him that this was a good career choice. He graduated in 1968 and went to McMaster University in Hamilton, Ontario, to do a Ph.D. under the supervision of the crystallographer H. Douglas Grundy. Doug Grundy gave him an amphibole to "look at", and this look developed into his Ph.D. thesis on the crystal chemistry of the amphiboles. McMaster University has a Materials Research Institute that was situated in the Senior Science Building together with the Departments of Geology, Chemistry and Physics. Everyone took coffee and lunch together in an atmosphere that was scientifically intoxicating for graduate students; all the disciplines mixed together and discussed science every day. The institute gave Hawthorne the opportunity for both hands-on use of single-crystal X-ray diffraction, single-crystal neutron diffraction, infrared spectroscopy and Mössbauer spectroscopy, and for making the acquaintance of prominent scientists. In particular, he met the physicist I. David Brown and the chemist R.D. Shannon (on sabbatical from DuPont) when they were developing Bond-Valence Theory. This theory went on to play a major role in Hawthorne's work and he became lifelong friends with Brown and Shannon.

== Career and informal education ==
Frank Hawthorne graduated with a Ph.D. in 1973 and went on to a post-doctoral position with Professor Robert B. Ferguson in the Department of Geological Sciences at the University of Manitoba in Winnipeg, Canada. This was another important step in his development as it exposed him to a wide variety of minerals from granitic pegmatites, particularly through the influence of Petr Černý, and he worked on a wide variety of pegmatite minerals with Černý and Ferguson, returning several times a year to the Materials Research Institute at McMaster University to collect single-crystal X-ray data (at no cost). At the end of his post-doctoral fellowship, he became a Research Associate, operating the electron microprobe and lecturing for other faculty members when they went on sabbatical leave. After seven years of this rather precarious existence, he secured a University Research Fellowship in 1980, the first year of that program. The Federal Government recognized that there were few academic jobs available in the 1970s and introduced the URF program whereby a recipient received a salary and a modest research grant to act as a faculty member (lecture and do research) for 5 years. If at the end of this time, the URF was hired as a faculty member by the university, the salary was paid in part by the Federal Government over the next 5 years. In 1983, Frank Hawthorne received a Major Equipment Grant from the Natural Sciences and Engineering Research Council of Canada for a Single-Crystal Diffractometer and began to build his laboratory and have graduate students. At this time, Hawthorne established connections with the Royal Ontario Museum as a source of crystals for minerals of unknown structure, and accompanied staff (Fred J. Wicks and Terri Ottaway) to the Tucson Gem and Mineral Show where he connected with mineral collectors and dealers who were to become the principal source of crystals for his experimental work. In 1983, he was invited to give a lecture at the University of Pavia. This began one of the major scientific collaborations of his career with Drs. Roberta Oberti (it), Luciano Ungaretti and Giuseppi Rossi on the crystal chemistry of amphiboles, and he has spent ~4 years in Italy working with them on crystal chemistry and with Giancarlo Della Ventura in Rome on short-range order in amphiboles. In 1985, he went to the University of Chicago for 2 months to work with Joseph V. Smith on the topology of four-connected three-dimensional nets. There he met the theoretical chemist Jeremy Burdett who introduced him to the moments approach to the electronic energy density of solids. This was pivotal for Hawthorne's ideas on structure as it connected the topology of chemical bonds with the energy of the constituent crystals.

In 2001, he was awarded a Tier I Canada Research Chair which relieved him of some of his undergraduate teaching and allowed him to attract another crystallographer, Elena Sokolova, to the department, first as a Research Associate and later as a Research Professor. Sokolova has had a major influence on his ideas concerning crystal structure and also introduced him to the Crystallography-Mineralogy community in Russia. He obtained funding from the Federal Government of Canada to develop a large laboratory: several X-ray diffractometers, polarized infrared spectroscopy and Raman spectroscopy, bulk- and milli-Mössbauer spectroscopy, electron microprobe and a micro-SIMS for secondary-ion mass spectrometry, and formed a consortium with other local scientists for him and his students to have access to magic-angle-spinning nuclear magnetic resonance, atomic force microscopy, and X-ray photoelectron spectroscopy, all of which were used extensively to characterize minerals and geochemical processes.

== Scientific work ==
Traditionally, mineralogy has been an observational science: mineralogists describe new minerals, measure the stability fields of known minerals with respect to intensive thermodynamic variables, solve and refine crystal structures, and attempt to develop empirical schemes of organization of this knowledge, and apply these schemes to problems in the Earth and Environmental Sciences. Most minerals are complex (sensu lato) objects from both structural and chemical perspectives. On the one hand, this makes a quantitative theoretical understanding of the factors controlling structure, chemical composition and occurrence difficult to impossible by established theoretical methods in physics and chemistry. On the other hand, the more complicated a mineral, for example, veblenite: KNa(H_{2}O)_{3}[(Fe_{2}+5Fe_{3}+4Mn_{2}+6Ca_{□})(OH)_{10}(Nb_{4}O_{4}{Si_{2}O_{7}}_{2}(Si_{8}O_{22})_{2})O_{2}], the more information it contains about its origin and properties. The principal thrust of Hawthorne's work has been to establish the theoretical underpinnings of more rigorous approach to Mineralogy. The patterns of linkage of chemical bonds in space contain significant energetic information that may be used for this purpose. Bond Topology combines aspects of Graph Theory, Bond-Valence Theory, and the moments approach to the electronic-energy density-of-states to interpret topological aspects of crystal structure, and allows consideration of many issues of crystal structure, mineral composition, and mineral behavior that are not addressed by established methods.

=== Theoretical work ===
==== Bond topology as a theoretical basis for Mineralogy ====
Using Graph Theory, the topological characteristics of a bond network may be represented as a weighted chromatic digraph of coordination polyhedra and their connectivities. The elements of the adjacency matrix of this graph form a permutation group that is a subgroup of the symmetric group SN (where N is the number of unique off-diagonal elements of the adjacency matrix), and one may use counting theorems (e.g., Pólya enumeration theorem) to enumerate all edge sets (linkages between polyhedra) that are distinct, thereby counting all distinct local arrangements of coordination polyhedra. This approach allows all topologically possible local arrangements to be enumerated for specific sets of coordination polyhedra. Infinite arrangements with translational symmetry may be represented by finite graphs via wrapping and extends this method to crystals. Work by the late Jeremy Burdett showed that the electronic energy density of states can be derived using the method of moments, and that the energy difference between two structures depends primarily on the first few disparate moments of their respective energy density of states This leads to the following conclusions: (1) zero-order moments define chemical composition; (2) second-order moments define coordination numbers; (3) fourth- and sixth-order moments define local connectivity of coordination polyhedra; and (4) higher moments define medium- and long-range connectivity. Using the moments approach, it may be shown that anion-coordination changes in chemical reactions quantitatively correlate with the reduced enthalpy of formation of the reactants from the product phases for some simple mineral reactions and that changes in bond topology correlate with reduced enthalpy of formation for some simple hydrated phases

==== Chemical reactions in minerals ====
Using the moments approach (see above), chemical reactions in minerals may be divided into two types: (1) Continuous reactions in which bond topology is conserved; and (2) discontinuous reactions in which bond topology is not conserved. (1) For continuous reactions, thermal expansion and elastic compression must be accompanied by element substitutions that maintain commensurability between different components of the structure. Hence one can define from an atomistic perspective the qualitative changes caused by variation in temperature and pressure. Extensive experimental work has shown that short-range order is ubiquitous in amphiboles and defines the chemical pathways by which these minerals respond to varying temperature and pressure. The theoretical developments that underpin this behaviour indicate that they should apply to all other anisodesmic minerals (2) Minerals in which bond topology is not conserved in chemical reactions form the majority of mineral species, but are less quantitatively abundant; however, they form the majority of the environmentally relevant minerals. The criteria that control the chemical composition and stability of these minerals at the atomic level may be derived from the valence-sum rule and valence-matching principle and much of this complexity can be quantitatively predicted reasonably well, and species in aqueous solution also follow the valence-sum rule, and that their Lewis basicities scale with pH of the solution at maximum concentration of the species in solution Complex species in aqueous solution actually form the building blocks of the crystallizing minerals, and hence the structures retain a record of the pH of the solutions from which they crystallized.

==== Structure hierarchy ====
A mathematical hierarchy is an ordered set of elements where the ordering reflects a natural hierarchical relation between the elements. The structure hierarchy hypothesis states that structures may be ordered hierarchically according to the polymerization of coordination polyhedra of higher bond valence. Structure hierarchies have two functions: (1) they serve to organize our knowledge of minerals (crystal structures) in a coherent manner, and in this way relate to the original structure classifications of William Lawrence Bragg and Nikolai Belov; (2) if the basis of the classification involves factors that are related to the mechanistic details of the stability and behaviour of minerals, then the physical, chemical and paragenetic characteristics of minerals should arise as natural consequences of their crystal structures and the interaction of those structures with the environment in which they occur. The structure hierarchy hypothesis may be justified by considering a hypothetical structure-building process whereby higher bond-valence polyhedra polymerize to form the structural unit. This hypothetical structure-building process resembles our ideas of crystallization from an aqueous solution, whereby complexes in aqueous and hydrothermal solutions condense to form crystal structures, or fragments of linked polyhedra in a magma condense to form a crystal. Although our knowledge of these processes is rather vague from a mechanistic perspective, the foundations of the structure hypothesis give us a framework within which to think about the processes of crystallization and dissolution Structure hierarchies have been developed for several mineral families, e.g. borates, uranyl oxides and oxysalts, phosphate, sulfate, arsenate and oxide-centered Cu, Pb and Hg minerals

=== Experimental work ===
==== The role of hydrogen in crystal structures ====
Hydrogen was long considered a fairly unimportant component in minerals, particularly when present as "water of hydration". This view has now changed: the polar nature of hydrogen controls the dimensions of polymerization of strongly bonded oxyanions in crystal structures, giving rise to cluster, chain, sheet and framework structures. Minerals forming in the core, mantle and deep crust do not incorporate so much hydrogen, and hydrogen is also far less polar at high pressures due to symmetrization of donor and acceptor bonds, and minerals generally crystallize as frameworks. Minerals forming in the shallow crust or at the Earth's surface have cluster, chain, sheet and framework structures in response to the constituent hydrogen.

==== Short-range order-disorder in rock-forming minerals ====
Long-range order (LRO) describes the tendency for atoms to order at a specific location in a structure, averaged over the whole crystal. Short-Range Order (SRO) is the tendency for atoms to locally cluster in arrangements that are discordant with random distribution. A local form of Bond-Valence Theory (i.e., NOT a mean-field approach) can be used to predict patterns of SRO Infrared spectroscopy (IR) in the fundamental OH-stretching region is sensitive to both LRO and SRO of species bonded to OH, and one can combine Rietveld structure refinement and IR spectroscopy to derive patterns of SRO. Thus H can act as a local probe of SRO in many complex rock-forming minerals.

==== Light lithophile elements in rock-forming minerals ====
Light lithophile elements (LLEs) can be important variable components in several groups of rock-forming minerals that were thought either to be free of LLEs, or to contain stoichiometrically fixed amounts of these components. Systematic examination of these types of crystal-chemical issues using a combination of SREF (Site-occupancy REFinement), SIMS (Secondary-Ion Mass Spectrometry) and HLE (Hydrogen-Line Extraction) showed this not to be the case. Of particular importance are the role of Li, Ti and H in amphiboles, Li and H in staurolite and Li in tourmaline This work has resulted in much improved understanding of the crystal chemistry of these minerals, and the possibility for more realistic activity models for their thermodynamic treatment.

==== Crystal chemistry of amphibole-supergroup minerals ====
In 1987, Hawthorne began collaboration with Roberta Oberti, Luciano Ungaretti and Giuseppe Rossi in Pavia using large-scale crystal-structure refinement and electron-microprobe analysis of amphiboles to solve many crystal-chemical problems, e.g. This work has had a major impact on the understanding of amphibole structure, chemical composition and occurrence and resulted in a more comprehensive classification and nomenclature for these minerals

==== Crystal chemistry of tourmaline-supergroup minerals ====
The tourmaline minerals rival the amphiboles in complexity, and were relatively neglected until twenty-five years ago. Hawthorne and his students began crystal-chemical work on these minerals and rapidly identified a new subgroup of tourmaline minerals, showed that tourmaline has more complicated cation-ordering patterns than was hitherto thought, and a new classification scheme for the tourmaline-supergroup minerals was approved by the International Mineralogical Association. There has since been a major increase in tourmaline studies, turning it into a petrogenetically useful mineral.

==== Description of new minerals ====
Systematic work on the crystal chemistry of rock-forming minerals have led to the discovery many hitherto unrecognized types of chemical substitution, e.g. The main interest with regard to accessory minerals is the opportunity to examine novel crystal structures in relation to the hierarchical organization of structural arrangements in general. Often by serendipity, this work has led to some interesting findings such as the discovery of thiosulphate in sidpietersite and [C_{4}-Hg_{2+4}]_{4+} groups in mikecoxite Hawthorne has been involved in the discovery of 180 new mineral species.

== Honours ==
- Frankhawthorneite is named after him
- 1978, elected Fellow of the Mineralogical Society of America
- 1984, awarded the Hawley Medal of the Mineralogical Association of Canada
- 1985, elected Fellow of the Geological Association of Canada
- 1990, elected Fellow of the Royal Society of Canada
- 1991, awarded the W.W. Hutchison Medal of the Geological Association of Canada
- 1991, awarded a Killam Fellowship by the Canada Council
- 1993, awarded the Willet G. Miller Medal of the Royal Society of Canada
- 1994, awarded the Hawley Medal of the Mineralogical Association of Canada
- 1995, awarded the Schlumberger Medal of the Mineralogical Society of Great Britain and Northern Ireland
- 1996, awarded the Logan Medal, the highest honour of the Geological Association of Canada
- 1997, Rh Institute Foundation Award for Excellence in Research
- 1997, appointed Distinguished Professor of the University of Manitoba
- 1998, awarded the Hawley Medal of the Mineralogical Association of Canada
- 1999, awarded the Peacock Medal of the Mineralogical Association of Canada
- 2001, awarded a Tier I Canada Research Chair in Crystallography and Mineralogy
- 2001, listed by Science Watch as the most highly cited Mineralogist/Crystallographer for 1990–2000
- 2005, appointed an Officer of the Order of Canada
- 2006, elected Foreign Fellow of the Russian Academy of Sciences
- 2007, listed by Science Watch as the most highly cited Geoscientist in the world for the decade 1996–2007
- 2007, elected Fellow of the Geochemical Society
- 2007, elected Fellow of the European Association of Geochemistry
- 2008, awarded the Killam Prize in Natural Sciences by the Canada Council
- 2009, awarded the IMA Medal of the International Mineralogical Association
- 2009, awarded the Carnegie Medal by the Carnegie Museum of Natural History
- 2010, awarded the Bancroft Medal of the Royal Society of Canada
- 2012, awarded the Queen's Diamond Jubilee Medal
- 2013, awarded the Roebling Medal of the Mineralogical Society of America
- 2015, elected Life Fellow of the Royal Society of Canada
- 2015, elected Fellow of the Geological Society of America
- 2015, elected Honorary Fellow of the Russian Mineralogical Society
- 2016, elected Honorary Fellow of the Società Italiana di Mineralogia e Petrologia
- 2016, special issue of the Canadian Mineralogist published to honour the career of Frank Hawthorne
- 2017, awarded the Fersman Medal by the Fersman Mineralogical Museum of the Russian Academy of Sciences
- 2018, appointed Distinguished Professor Emeritus, University of Manitoba
- 2018, awarded Buerger Medal by the American Crystallographic Association
- 2018, appointed Companion of the Order of Canada
- 2020, elected to the Academia Europaea
- 2021, elected Fellow of the American Crystallographic Association

== Bibliography ==
=== Journal articles ===
- Hawthorne, Frank C. (January 1981). "Crystal chemistry of the amphiboles". Reviews in Mineralogy and Geochemistry. 9A: 1–102. S2CID 129882165.
- Hawthorne, Frank C. (1 September 1983). "Graphical enumeration of polyhedral clusters". Acta Crystallographica Section A: Foundations of Crystallography. 39 (5): 724–736. Bibcode:1983AcCrA..39..724H. doi:10.1107/S0108767383001452. ISSN 0108-7673.
- Hawthorne, Frank C. (May 1983). "The crystal chemistry of the amphiboles". The Canadian Mineralogist. 21 (2): 173–480.
- Burns, Peter C.; Grice, Joel D. [in German]; Hawthorne, Frank C. (January 1995). "Borate minerals. I. Polyhedral clusters and fundamental building blocks" (PDF). The Canadian Mineralogist. 33: 1131–1151. S2CID 132696304. Archived from the original (PDF) on 4 March 2016.
- Burns, Peter C.; Ewing, Rodney C.; Hawthorne, Frank C. (1997). "The crystal chemistry of hexavalent uranium: polyhedron geometries, bond-valence parameters, and polymerization of polyhedra" (PDF). The Canadian Mineralogist. 35: 1551–1570. S2CID 20224412. Archived from the original (PDF) on 4 March 2016.
- Hawthorne, Frank C.; Oberti, Roberta [in Italian] (October 2007). "Classification of the Amphiboles". Reviews in Mineralogy and Geochemistry. 67 (1): 55–88. Bibcode:2007RvMG...67...55H. doi:10.2138/rmg.2007.67.2. S2CID 129587005.
- Hawthorne, Frank C. (2012). "A bond-topological approach to theoretical mineralogy: crystal structure, chemical composition and chemical reactions". Physics and Chemistry of Minerals. 39 (10): 841–874. Bibcode:2012PCM....39..841H. doi:10.1007/s00269-012-0538-4. ISSN 0342-1791. S2CID 97959636.
- Hawthorne, F. C. (2014). "The structure hierarchy hypothesis". Mineralogical Magazine. 78 (4): 957–1027. Bibcode:2014MinM...78..957H. doi:10.1180/minmag.2014.078.4.13. ISSN 0026-461X. S2CID 101776945.
- Hawthorne, F. C. (1 April 2015). "Toward theoretical mineralogy: A bond-topological approach". American Mineralogist. 100 (4): 696–713. Bibcode:2015AmMin.100..696H. doi:10.2138/am-2015-5114. ISSN 0003-004X. S2CID 98836563.
- Day, Maxwell Christopher; Hawthorne, Frank Christopher (1 May 2022). "Bond topology of chain, ribbon and tube silicates. Part I. Graph-theory generation of infinite one-dimensional arrangements of ( T O 4 ) n − tetrahedra". Acta Crystallographica Section A: Foundations and Advances. 78 (3): 212–233. doi:10.1107/S2053273322001747. ISSN 2053-2733. PMC 9062827. PMID 35502713.

=== Books ===
- Frank C. Hawthorne; Roberta Oberti [in Italian]; Giancarlo Della Ventura; Annibale Mottana, eds. (2007). Amphiboles: crystal chemistry, occurrence, and health issues. Mineralogical Society of America. ISBN 9780939950799. OCLC 176897672.
- F. C. Hawthorne, ed. (2006). Landmark papers: structure topology. London: Mineralogical Society of Great Britain & Ireland. ISBN 0-903056-23-2. OCLC 191821912.
- Frank C. Hawthorne, ed. (1988). Spectroscopic methods in mineralogy and geology. Washington, D.C.: Mineralogical Society of America. ISBN 0-939950-22-7. OCLC 17967077.
