= Matteo Alvaro =

Italian geologist

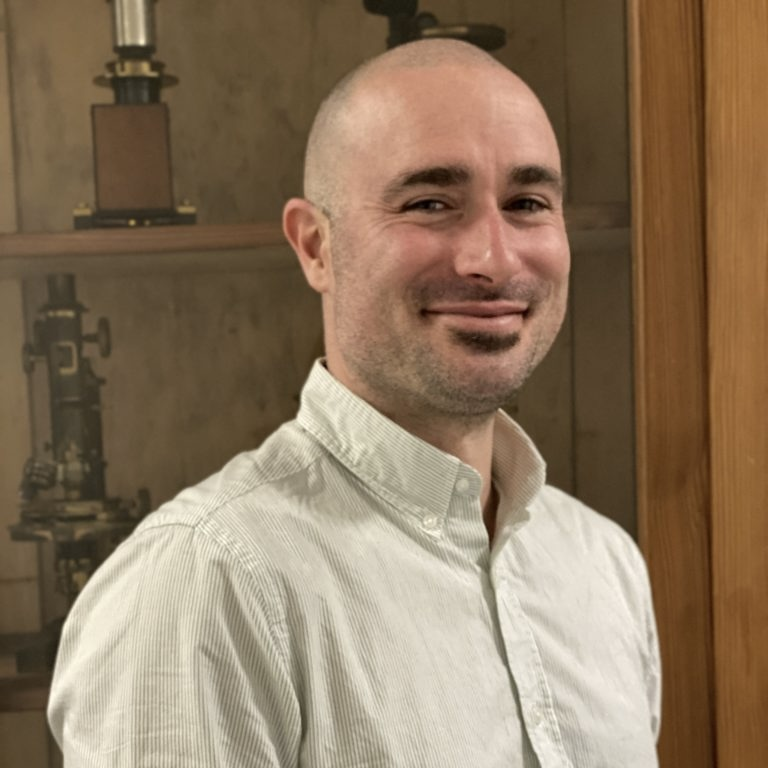
- Alvaro in 2023
- Education: University of Pavia
- Awards: Ugo Panichi prize, Mario Nardelli prize, EMU Research Excellence Medal
- Scientific career
- Fields: Mineralogy, mineral physics, crystallography, elastic geothermobarometry, planetary sciences
- Workplaces: University of Pavia
- Website: https://www.mineralogylab.com/, http://sciter.unipv.eu/site/home/persone/scheda720005650.html

Matteo Alvaro is an Italian geologist with expertise in mineralogy, mineral physics, and crystallography who is currently professor of mineralogy at the Department of Earth and Environmental Sciences of the University of Pavia. He is leading author or co-author of over 100 articles in international scientific journals.

== Early life and education ==
Matteo Alvaro was born in Milan, Italy. He was educated at the University of Pavia where he obtained his bachelor's degree in earth sciences and natural resources in 2004 and master's degree applied earth sciences in 2006. In 2009, he obtained his PhD degree in earth science from the University of Pavia with a thesis on the characterization of the high-temperature and high-pressure behavior of several pyroxenes. He carried out his research during the PhD between the University of Pavia and the University of Padua.

== Career and research ==
In 2010, after concluding his PhD, Matteo Alvaro started working as a post-doc at Virginia Tech in the group of Ross J Angel and Nancy L. Ross to research the structural and elastic behavior of crystalline material at high-pressure conditions. In 2012, he moved to Italy at the University of Chieti where he conducted studies focused on the investigation of volcanic systems in the framework of the ExoMars 2018 mission. In 2013, Alvaro joined the research group of Fabrizio Nestola at the University of Padua.

In 2017, Alvaro established the Experimental Mineralogy Laboratory in the Department of Earth and Environmental Sciences of the University of Pavia dedicated to the memory of Fiorenzo Mazzi.

== Award and honors ==
- 2015: Awarded the SIR-MIUR grant, a research fellowship awarded in Italy to investigators younger than 40 years old.
- 2016: Awarded the Ugo Panichi prize from the Italian Society of Mineralogy and Petrology for significant scientific contributions in the field of mineralogy.
- 2017: Awarded the European Research Council (ERC) Starting grant, awarded to scientists showing high potential with PhD obtained not later than 12 years before the application.
- 2018: Awarded the Mario Nardelli prize for researchers who contributed significantly to the development of the Italian crystallography.
- 2019: Nominated Rector's delegate for international affairs in Europe
- 2019 – 2026: Elected as Council Member of the Società Italiana di Mineralogia e Petrologia (SIMP)
- 2020: Nominated vice President of GLOBEC - "Center for Global Strategic Engagement"
- 2021: Awarded the EMU Research Excellence Medal by the European Mineralogical Union as an early career scientist who has made significant contributions to research in mineralogy and whose professional and societal activities contribute to strengthening scientific links in Europe
- 2023: Nominated Fellow of the Mineralogical Society of America (MSA)
