= Rodney C. Ewing =

American mineralogist and nuclear safety expert

Rodney Charles Ewing
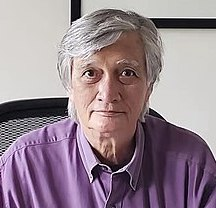
- Born: September 20, 1946 (age 80); Abilene, Texas
- Died: July 13, 2024 (aged 77)
- Education: Stanford University; Texas Christian University
- Awards: Lomonosov Gold Medal (2006); Dana Medal (2006); Roebling Medal (2015); Ian Campbell Medal (2015); Robert Cahn Award (2018); Distinguished Public Service Award (2019)
- Scientific career
- Fields: Materials Science; Mineralogy and Crystallography
- Workplaces: Stanford University; University of Michigan; University of New Mexico

Rodney Charles Ewing (September 20, 1946 – July 13, 2024) was an American mineralogist, a materials scientist and a nuclear safety expert whose research was focused on the properties of nuclear materials exposed to radiation and long-term geochemical alterations expected for radioactive waste disposal.

He was the Frank Stanton Professor in Nuclear Security at the Center for International Security and Cooperation, a Senior Fellow of the Freeman Spogli Institute for International Studies, a Senior Fellow of the Precourt Institute for Energy, an Affiliate of the Stanford Woods Institute for the Environment, and a professor in the School of Earth, Energy and Environmental Sciences at Stanford University.

He was also elected a member of the National Academy of Engineering in 2017 for studies on the long-term behavior of complex ceramic materials to assess their suitability for engineered nuclear waste sequestration.

== Biography and education ==
Born in Abilene, Texas, Ewing attended Texas Christian University (B.S., 1968, summa cum laude) and graduate school at Stanford University (M.S., 1972; Ph.D., 1974). From 1969 to 1970, he served in the United States Army as a Vietnamese interpreter attached to the 25th Infantry Division.

== Career ==
Ewing began his academic career as an assistant professor at the University of New Mexico (1974) rising to the rank of Regents’ Professor of Earth & Planetary Sciences in 1993. From 1997 to 2013, he was a professor at the University of Michigan in three Departments: Earth & Environmental Sciences, Nuclear Engineering & Radiological Sciences, and Materials Science & Engineering. In 2009, he was appointed as the Edward H. Kraus University Professor at the University of Michigan. In 2014, he joined Stanford University as a senior fellow at the Freeman Spogli Institute for International Studies and as a professor in the School of Earth, Energy and Environmental Sciences. He was a senior fellow at the Precourt Institute for Energy. He was Frank Stanton Professor in Nuclear Security and co-director of the Center for International Security and Cooperation.

== Research ==
His early research focused on an esoteric group of minerals, metamictization Nb-Ta-Ti oxides that are unusual because they have become amorphous due to radiation damage caused by the presence of radioactive elements. Over the past forty years, the early study of these unusual minerals has blossomed into a broadly based research program on radiation effects in complex ceramic materials. This has led to the development of techniques to predict the long-term behavior of materials, such as those used in radioactive waste disposal. He was the author or co-author of over 750 research publications and the editor or co-editor of 18 monographs, proceedings volumes or special issues of journals. He has published widely in mineralogy, geochemistry, materials science, nuclear materials, physics and chemistry in over 100 different ISI journals. He has been granted a patent for the development of a highly durable material for the immobilization of plutonium from dismantled nuclear weapons. He was a founding editor of the magazine, Elements, which is now supported by 18 earth science societies. He was a Principal Editor for Nano LIFE, an interdisciplinary journal focused on collaboration between physical and medical scientists. In 2014, he was appointed as one of the Founding Executive Editors of Geochemical Perspective Letters and to the Editorial Advisory Board for Applied Physics Reviews.

== Honors ==
Ewing has received the Hawley Medal of the Mineralogical Association of Canada in 1997 and 2002, a Guggenheim Fellowship in 2002, the Dana Medal of the Mineralogical Society of America in 2006, the Lomonosov Gold Medal of the Russian Academy of Sciences in 2006, an honorary doctorate from the Université Pierre et Marie Curie in 2007, the Roebling Medal of the Mineralogical Society of America in 2015, the Ian Campbell Medal of the American Geoscience Institute in 2015 and the Medal of Excellence from the International Mineralogical Association in 2015. He was a member of the National Academy of Engineering, a foreign Fellow of the Royal Society of Canada, and a fellow of the Geological Society of America, Mineralogical Society of America, Mineralogical Society of Great Britain and Ireland (honorary), American Geophysical Union, Geochemical Society and European Association of Geochemistry, American Ceramic Society, the American Association for the Advancement of Science and the Materials Research Society.

He has been a member of program committees for the symposium on the Scientific Basis for Nuclear Waste Management held in ten different countries over the past 40 years. He was a co-editor and a contributing author of Radioactive Waste Forms for the Future (North-Holland Physics, Amsterdam, 1988) and Uncertainty Underground—Yucca Mountain and the Nation's High-Level Nuclear Waste (MIT Press, 2006). Professor Ewing has served on thirteen National Research Council committees for the National Academies of Sciences, Engineering and Medicine that have reviewed issues related to nuclear waste and nuclear weapons. In 2008, he was a technical cooperation expert for the IAEA at the Comissão Nacional de Energia Nuclear in Rio de Janeiro, Brazil. In 2014, he was reappointed by Barack Obama to serve as the Chair of the Nuclear Waste Technical Review Board, which is responsible for ongoing and integrated technical review of DOE activities related to transporting, packaging, storing and disposing of spent nuclear fuel and high-level radioactive waste. He stepped down from the Board in 2017.

He was president of the Mineralogical Society of America (2002) and the International Union of Materials Research Societies (1997–1998). Ewing also served on the board of directors of the Geochemical Society (2012–2015), the Board of Governors of the Gemological Institute of America (2006–2015) and the Science and Security Board of the Bulletin of the Atomic Scientists (2012–2022).

In 2017, a new mineral "Ewingite" (a complex hydrous uranyl carbonate mineral of magnesium and calcium discovered in the Plavno mine (Czech Republic) with chemical formula: Mg_{8}Ca_{8}(UO_{2})_{24}(CO_{3})_{30}O_{4}(OH)_{12}·138H_{2}O) was named in honor of Professor Ewing by Olds et al. Known as the most structurally complex mineral on Earth, the ewingite type specimen has been placed at the Natural History Museum of Los Angeles County.

== Notable publications ==
- Lutze, Werner; Ewing, Rodney C., eds. (1988). Radioactive Waste Forms for the Future. New York: Elsevier Science Pub Co, Inc. ISBN 0444871047.
- Murakami, Takashi; Chakoumakos, Bryan C.; Ewing, Rodney C.; Lumpkin, Gregory R.; Weber, William J. (October 1991). "Alpha-decay event damage in zircon". American Mineralogist. 76 (9–10): 1510–1532. S2CID 94644491.
- Finch, Robert J.; Ewing, Rodney C. (August 2, 1992). "Corrosion of uraninite under oxidizing conditions". Journal of Nuclear Materials. 190: 133–156. doi:10.1016/0022-3115(92)90083-W. S2CID 97021679.
- Ewing, Rodney C.; Weber, William J.; Clinard, Jr., Frank W. (February 1, 1995). "Radiation effects in nuclear waste forms for high-level radioactive waste". Progress in Nuclear Energy. 29 (2): 63–127. doi:10.1016/0149-1970(94)00016-Y. S2CID 120935189.
- Burns, Peter C.; Miller, M.L.; Ewing, Rodney C. (August 1996). "U^{6+}minerals and inorganic phases: A comparison and hierarchy of crystal structures". Canadian Mineralogist. 34 (4): 845–880. S2CID 100418126.
- Burns, Peter C.; Ewing, Rodney C.; Hawthorne, Frank C. (1997). "The crystal chemistry of hexavalent uranium: polyhedron geometries, bond-valence parameters, and polymerization of polyhedra" (PDF). The Canadian Mineralogist. 35: 1551–1570. S2CID 20224412. Archived from the original (PDF) on March 4, 2016.
- Weber, W.J.; Ewing, R.C.; Catlow, C.R.A.; Diaz de la Rubi, T.; Hobbs, L.W.; Kinoshita, C.; Matzke, Hj.; Motta, A.T.; Natasi, M.; Salje, E.H.K.; Vance, E.R.; Zinkle, S.J. (June 1998). "Radiation effects in crystalline ceramics for the immobilization of high-level nuclear waste and plutonium". Journal of Materials Research. 13 (6): 1434–1484. Bibcode:1998JMatR..13.1434W. doi:10.1557/JMR.1998.0205.
- Ewing, Rodney C.; Weber, William J.; Lian, Jie (June 2004). "Nuclear waste disposal — Pyrochlore (A_{2}B_{2}O_{7}): A nuclear waste form for the immobilization of plutonium and "minor" actinides". Journal of Applied Physics. 95: 5949–5971. doi:10.1063/1.1707213. hdl:2027.42/70818. S2CID 118174088.
- Reich, Martin; Kesler, Stephen E. [in German]; Utsunomiya, Satoshi; Palenik, Christopher S.; Chryssoulis, Stephen L.; Ewing, Rodney C. (June 2005). "Solubility of gold in arsenian pyrite". Geochimica et Cosmochimica Acta. 69 (11): 2781–2796. doi:10.1016/j.gca.2005.01.011. S2CID 93331419.
- Ewing, Rodney C. (February 20, 2015). "Long-term storage of spent nuclear fuel: Commentary". Nature Materials. 14: 252–257. doi:10.1038/nmat4226. PMID 25698421. S2CID 7859707.
- Ewing, Rodney C.; Grambow, Bernd (February 18, 2025). "Final thoughts: The fragile connection of safety and science in the geological disposal of radioactive waste". Bulletin of the Atomic Scientists.
