= Ronald Cohen =

Ronald Cohen, or Ron Cohen, may refer to:

- Ronald A. Cohen (born 1955), American neuropsychologist
- Ronald E. Cohen (born 1957), American geophysicist
- Ronald L. Cohen, American social psychologist, focusing on justice
- Ronald M. Cohen (1939–1998), screenwriter and film producer
- Sir Ronald Mourad Cohen, British multimillionaire venture capitalist and political figure
- Ron Cohen, composer
- Ronald C. Cohen, American chemist and environmental scientist
