= Geothermobarometry =

History of rock pressure and temperature

Geothermobarometry is the methodology for estimating the pressure and temperature history of rocks (metamorphic, igneous, or sedimentary). Geothermobarometry is a combination of geobarometry, where the pressure attained (and retained) by a mineral assemblage is estimated, and geothermometry where the temperature attained (and retained) by a mineral assemblage is estimated.

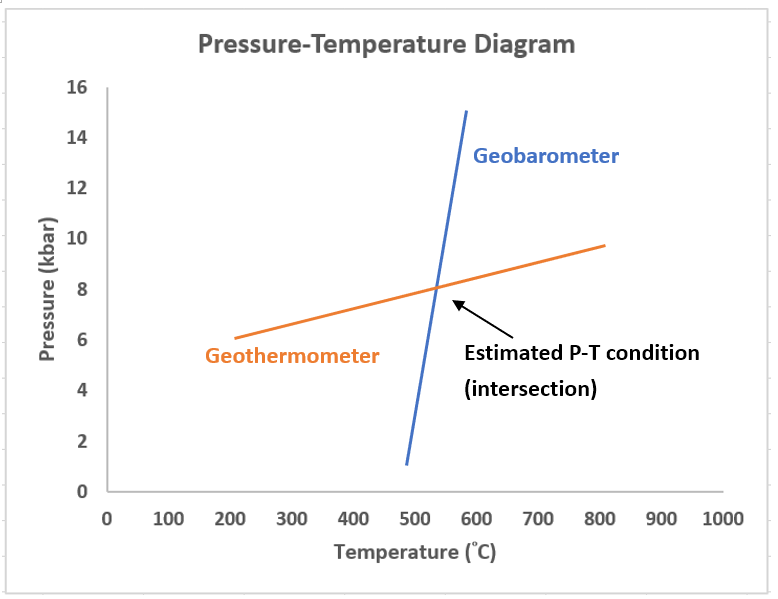
An illustration of geothermobarometry. A line of temperature equilibrium (orange) and a line of pressure equilibrium (blue) of selected mineral assemblages found in the specimen are plotted on the P-T diagram. The intersection represents the likely P-T condition experienced by rock in its metamorphic history.

== Methodology ==
Geothermobarometry relies upon understanding the temperature and pressure of the formation of minerals within rocks. There are several methods of measuring the temperature or pressure of mineral formation or re-equilibration relying for example on chemical equilibrium between minerals, or by measuring the chemical composition and/or the crystal-chemical state of order of individual minerals, or by measuring the residual stresses on solid inclusions or densities in fluid inclusions.

"Classic" (thermodynamic) thermobarometry relies upon the attainment of thermodynamic equilibrium between mineral pairs/assemblages that vary their compositions as a function of temperature and pressure. The distribution of component elements between the mineral assemblages is then analysed using a variety of analytical techniques, such as electron microprobing (EM), scanning electron microscopy (SEM), and mass spectrometry (MS). There are numerous extra factors to consider such as oxygen fugacity and water activity (roughly, the same as concentration) that must be accounted for using the appropriate methodological and analytical approach (e.g. Mössbauer spectroscopy, micro-raman spectroscopy, infrared spectroscopy, etc.). Geobarometers are typically net-transfer reactions, which are sensitive to pressure but have little change with temperature, such as garnet-plagioclase-muscovite-biotite reaction that involves a significant volume reduction upon high pressure:

$$\mathsf{\underbrace\ce{ Fe3Al2Si3O12 }_{\text{Fe-Al garnet}}+\underbrace\ce{Ca3Al2Si3O12}_{\text{Ca-Al garnet}}+\underbrace\ce{KAl3Si3O10(OH)2}_{\text{muscovite}}\ \ce{<=>} \ \underbrace\ce{3CaAl2Si2O8}_{\text{plagioclase}}+\underbrace\ce{KFe3AlSi3O10(OH)2}_{\text{biotite}}}$$

Since mineral assemblages at equilibrium are dependent on pressures and temperatures, by measuring the composition of the coexisting minerals, together with using suitable activity models, the P-T conditions experienced by the rock can be determined.

After one equilibrium constant is found, a line would be plotted on the P-T diagram. As different equilibrium constants of mineral assemblages would occur as lines with different slopes in the P-T diagram, therefore, by finding the intersection of at least two lines in the P-T diagram, the P-T condition of the specimen can be obtained.

Despite the usefulness of geothermobarometry, special attention should be paid to whether the mineral assemblages represent an equilibrium, any occurrence of retrograde equilibrium in the rock, and appropriateness of calibration of the results.

Elastic thermobarometry is a method of determining the equilibrium pressure and temperature attained by the host mineral and its inclusion on the rock history from the excess pressures exhibited by mineral inclusions trapped inside host minerals. Upon exhumation and cooling, contrasting compressibilities and thermal expansivities induce differential strains (volume mismatches) between a host crystal and its inclusions. These strains can be quantified in situ using Raman spectroscopy or X-ray diffraction. Knowing equations of state and elastic properties of minerals, elastic thermobarometry inverts measured strains to calculate the pressure-temperature conditions under which the stress state was uniform in the host and inclusion. These are commonly interpreted to represent the conditions of inclusion entrapment or the last elastic equilibration of the pair.

Data on geothermometers and geobarometers is derived from both laboratory studies on synthetic (artificial) mineral assemblages and from natural systems for which other constraints are available.

For example, one of the best known and most widely applicable geothermometers is the garnet-biotite relationship where the relative proportions of iron and magnesium in garnet and biotite change with increasing temperature, so measurement of the compositions of these minerals to give the Fe-Mg distribution between them allows the temperature of crystallization to be calculated, given some assumptions.

=== Assumptions in thermodynamic thermobarometry ===
In natural systems, chemical reactions occur in open systems with unknown geological and chemical histories, and the application of geothermobarometers relies on several assumptions that must hold in order for the laboratory data and natural compositions to relate in a valid fashion:

- That the full mineralogical assemblage required for the thermobarometer is present. If not all of the minerals of the reaction are present, or did not equilibrate with each other simultaneously, then any pressures and temperatures calculated for the ideal reaction will deviate from those actually experienced by the rock.
- That chemical equilibrium was achieved to a satisfactory degree. This could be impossible to demonstrate definitively, if the minerals of the thermobarometer assemblage are not all observed in contact with each other.
- That any minerals in a two-mineral barometer or thermometer grew in equilibrium, which is assumed when the minerals are seen to be in contact.
- That the mineral assemblage has not been altered by retrograde metamorphism, which can be assessed using an optical microscope in most cases.
- That certain mineralogical assemblages are present. Without these, the accuracy of a reading may be altered from an ideal, and there may be more error inherent in the measurement.
- That minerals present in thin section are in the same solid solution state as in the model. Many minerals such as feldspars and augite have a range of solid solution variations. Each variation can effect the model and the way a rock is metamorphosed over time.

=== Assumptions in elastic thermobarometry ===
In natural systems, the elastic behaviour of minerals can be easily perturbed by high-temperature re-equilibration, plastic or brittle deformation, leading to an irreversible change beyond the elastic regime that will prevent reconstructing the "elastic history" of the pair.

- The major assumption behind elastic geobarometry is that the host and the inclusion have experienced initially the same pressure and that deformation of the host-inclusion system is elastic, hence reversible, and can therefore be inverted to obtain the entrapment pressure of the inclusion.
- The shape of the inclusion is assumed to be spherical but calculations for non-spherical shapes are available.
- For several host-inclusion pairs the elastic properties for the host and the inclusion are assumed to be isotropic. For some pairs, anisotropic solutions are available (e.g. quartz in garnet, zircon in garnet).
- Simple calculation methods assume linear elasticity.

== Techniques ==
Some techniques include:

=== Geothermometers ===
- Titanium saturation content of biotite mica.
- Iron-magnesium exchange between garnet-biotite and garnet-amphibole.
- Magnesium-iron systematics in pigeonites and augites
- Zirconium content of rutile, effective for higher temperatures than the Ti-in-biotite thermometer. Requires quartz, rutile, and zircon to be equilibrated.
- Titanium-in-zircon crystallization thermometer.

Note that the Fe-Mg exchange thermometers are empirical (laboratory tested and calibrated) as well as calculated based on a theoretical thermodynamic understanding of the components and phases involved. The titanium-in-biotite thermometer is solely empirical and not well-understood thermodynamically.

=== Geobarometers ===
- GASP; an acronym for the assemblage garnet-(Al_{2}SiO_{5})-silica-plagioclase
- GPMB; an acronym for the assemblage garnet-plagioclase-muscovite-biotite
- Garnet-plagioclase-hornblende-quartz.
- Hornblende

Various mineral assemblages rely more upon pressure than temperature; for example, reactions which involve a large volume change. At high pressure, specific minerals assume lower volumes (therefore density increases, as the mass does not change) – it is these minerals which are good indicators of paleo-pressure.

=== Software ===
Software for "classic" thermobarometry includes:

- Thermo-Calc software was founded in 1997, but it all started much before that, as early as the mid-1970s. The place was the department for physical metallurgy at the Royal Institute of Technology (KTH) in Stockholm, Sweden, where Mats Hillert was a professor. Three of his graduate students at this time were Bo Sundman, Bo Janssno, and John Ågren. Thermo-calc is used by materials scientists and engineers to generate material properties data, gain insights about materials, understand a specific observation, and answer direct questions related to a specific material or its processing. Used in conjunction with suitable databases, Thermo-Calc can be used for a wide variety of applications.
- THERMOCALC developed by Tim Holland and Roger Powell calculates model phase equilibria involving the HPx-eos or individual end-members from the Holland & Powell dataset.
- Perple_X, originally developed by James A.D. Connolly. is a collection of Fortran programs for calculating and displaying petrologic phase equilibria.
- XMapTools, originally developed by Pierre Lanari, is an advanced analysis software for quantitative chemical analysis of solids in 1D, 2D, and 3D. It provides numerical tools and packages implemented in a guided and versatile environment that allows one to explore and visualise data in ones own way. For example, XMapTools includes a wide range of data-processing options including routines for classification, segmentation, calibration, and visualisation via single- and multi-channel maps or via binary, ternary, and spider diagrams. Now it includes Bingo Antidote.
- Bingo-Antidote is a petrological software originally developed by Pierre Lanari and Erik Duesterhoeft that offers an alternative modelling strategy based on iterative thermodynamic models integrated with quantitative compositional mapping. The latter is distributed as an XMapTools add-on and comes with a redesigned graphical user interface and improved features.

Software for elastic thermobarometry includes:

- EntraPT, originally developed by Mattia L. Mazzucchelli, Ross J. Angel, and Matteo Alvaro, is a web application for elastic geobarometry. It is designed to make elastic thermobarometry easier. One can graphically analyze the residual strains of inclusions and estimate their entrapment conditions, all in one place. It also makes it easy to export, reuse, share and compare data.
- Strainman, originally developed by Ross J. Angel, Mara Murri, Boriana Mihailova, and Matteo Alvaro is a computer program for Windows for calculating strains from changes in Raman (or other phonon) mode wavenumbers, and vice-versa.
- EosFit is a software suite for calculations involving both thermal expansion and equations of state which now includes five major components to perform EoS calculations both with (EosFit7GUI) and without (EosFit7c) a graphic user interface and to perform host-inclusion calculations (Eosfit7-Pinc) with nonlinear elasticity. Eosfit uses cfml_eos, a validated set of Fortran modules that can be 'used' (in the Fortran sense) to easily write programs that can read, manipulate, and fit EoS data, and perform related calculations for EoS.
- Thermobar is a Python tool/library for thermobarometry, chemometry, and mineral equilibrium. Thermobar allows users to easily choose between more than 100 popular parameterizations involving liquid, olivine-liquid, olivine-spinel, pyroxene-only, pyroxene-liquid, two-pyroxene, feldspar-liquid, two-feldspar, amphibole and amphibole-liquid, garnet, and biotite equilibria.

=== Clinopyroxene thermobarometry ===
The mineral clinopyroxene is used for temperature and pressure calculations of the magma that produced igneous rock containing this mineral.

== See also ==
- Petrogenetic grid – Pressure-temperature diagram of mineral stability ranges
