= Chi Ma =

Mineralogist and analyst (born 1968) at Caltech

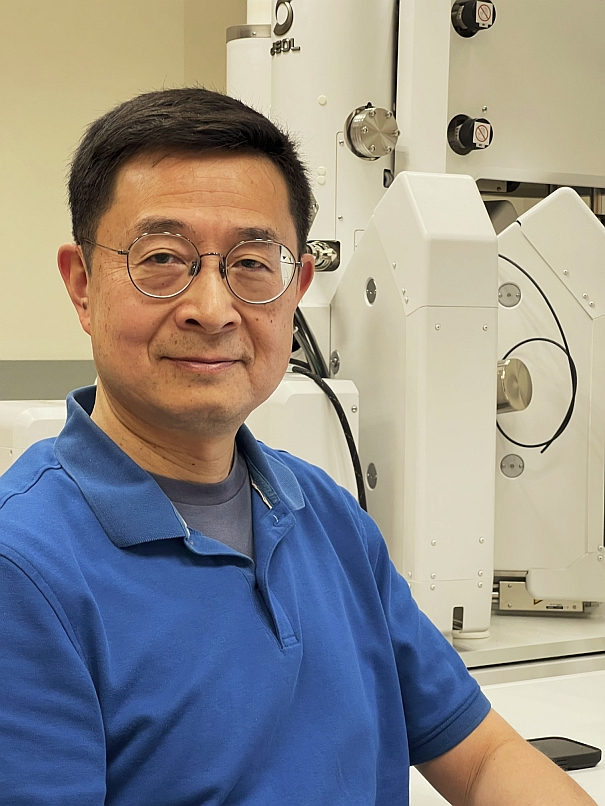
- Education: China University of Geosciences (Wuhan); University of Auckland; Australian National University
- Scientific career
- Fields: Mineralogy
- Workplaces: California Institute of Technology
- Doctoral advisor: Richard A (Tony) Eggleton

Chi Ma is a mineralogist and director of the Analytical Facility in the Division of Geological and Planetary Sciences at the California Institute of Technology, and is known for his discovery and characterization of new mineral phases in meteorites.

== Education ==
Ma received a Bachelor of Science degree in Petrology and Mineralogy from China University of Geosciences (Wuhan) in 1989 where he studied the metamorphism and petrology of the Hongan Group rocks in central China.

He then moved to New Zealand where he graduated with a Master of Science Degree with Distinction in Geology from the University of Auckland, and presented a thesis on the Alteration of the Huka Falls Formation in the Te Mihi area of the Wairakei geothermal system, supervised by Profesor Patrick Browne.

He received his Ph.D. in Mineralogy from the Australian National University under Professor Richard A (Tony) Eggleton with a thesis topic involving the ultra-structure of kaolin using high resolution electron microscopy and X-ray diffraction experiments.

Next, he moved to the United States where he was a postdoc with Mineralogy Professor George R. Rossman at the California Institute of Technology in Pasadena, California. As a postdoc at Caltech was initially involved with the characterization of colorful minerals such as rose quartz and rainbow obsidian.

== Career ==
Partway through his first year as a postdoc, he was hired to take over the electron microbeam analytical facility in the Division of Geological and Planetary Sciences at Caltech.

== Research ==
After assuming the directorship of the analytical facilities, he turned to the analysis of small mineral components of meteorites that brought new minerals from the primordial condensation of the Solar System. Many of these new minerals were phases that seldom or never survived the current weathering conditions on Earth. He worked on the Allende and Khatyrka Meteorites and on a variety of Martian meteorites such as the Tissint meteorite. These include new minerals such as tistarite, Ti_{2}O_{3}, ahrensite, γ-Fe_{2}SiO_{4}, tissintite,(Ca,Na,□)AlSi_{2}O_{6}, krotite, CaAl_{2}O_{4}, grossmanite, CaTi^{3+}AlSiO_{6} and allendeite, Sc_{4}Zr_{3}O_{12}.

He has discovered or co-discovered and characterized 58 new minerals mostly from meteorites and has collaborated with other researchers helping to characterize a total of 125 new minerals.

== Honors ==
2016 - A new refractory mineral from the solar nebula, Machiite (Al_{2}Ti_{3}O_{9}), was named after him.

2017 - He was elected a Fellow of the Mineralogical Society of America.

2024 - He was elected a Fellow of the Meteoritical Society.
