= W. G. Ernst =

American geologist (born 1931)

- Born: December 14, 1931 (age 94); St. Louis, Missouri, U.S.
- Education: Carleton College; University of Minnesota; Johns Hopkins University
- Scientific career
- Fields: Geology
- Workplaces: UCLA; Stanford
- Doctoral students: Frank S. Spear

W. Gary Ernst (born December 14, 1931) is an American geologist specializing in petrology and geochemistry. He currently is the Benjamin M. Page Professor Emeritus in Stanford University's department of geological sciences.

== Career ==
Ernst was born in St. Louis, Missouri. He received a B.A. degree in Geology from Carleton College in 1953, an M.S. in Geology from the University of Minnesota of 1955, and a Ph.D. in Geochemistry from Johns Hopkins University in 1959.

From 1960 to 1989, he was a professor in the Department of Earth and Space Sciences and Institute of Geophysics and Planetary Physics at UCLA, where he also served terms as chair of the Department of Geology, chair of the Department of Earth and Space Sciences, and director of the Institute of Geophysics and Planetary Physics. In 1989, he joined Stanford University as professor in the Department of Geological and Environmental Sciences and dean of the School of Earth Sciences. He retired in 2004, but has continued to be active professionally.

Ernst's research interests have included the petrology, geochemistry, and plate tectonics of Circumpacific and Alpine mobile belts, ultrahigh-pressure metamorphism in Eurasia, geology of the California Coast Ranges, the central Klamath Mountains, and White-Inyo Range, geobotany and remote sensing of the southwestern United States; and mineralogy and human health.

== Honors and awards ==
Ernst has been a member of the National Academy of Sciences since 1975. He has served as a trustee of the Carnegie Institution of Washington since 1990. He was the 2004 recipient of the Penrose Medal of the Geological Society of America, 2006 recipient of the Roebling Medal of the Mineralogical Society of America, and 2008 recipient of the Marcus Milling Legendary Geoscientist Medal. Other honors include selection as a Fellow of the American Academy of Arts and Sciences and Member of the American Philosophical Society. He was president of the Geological Society of America in 1986.
