= Dana Medal =

- Awarded for: Outstanding scientific contributions through original research in the mineralogical sciences by an individual in the midst of his or her career
- Sponsored by: Mineralogical Society of America (MSA)
- Date: Annually (typically)
- Country: United States (awarded by US society)
- First award: 1998

The Dana Medal, established in 1998, is awarded by the Mineralogical Society of America and is named in honor of the contributions made by James Dwight Dana (1813–1895) and Edward Salisbury Dana (1849–1935) to the science of mineralogy. It recognizes outstanding scientific contributions through original research in the mineralogical sciences by an individual in the midst of his or her career.

== Recipients ==
- 2001 – George R. Rossman
- 2002 – Michael F. Hochella, Jr.
- 2003 – Mark S. Ghiorso
- 2004 – R. James Kirkpatrick
- 2005 – William D. Carlson
- 2006 – Rodney C. Ewing
- 2007 – Frank S. Spear
- 2008 – Thomas Armbruster
- 2009 – Ronald E. Cohen
- 2010 – Jillian F. Banfield
- 2011 – Ross John Angel
- 2012 – Roberta Rudnick
- 2013 – Max W. Schmidt
- 2014 – Patricia M. Dove
- 2015 – Marc M. Hirschmann
- 2016 – Patrick Cordier
- 2016 - Sumit Chakraborty
- 2017 - Thomas W. Sisson
- 2018 - Jörg Hermann
- 2019 - Matthew J. Kohn
- 2020 - Daniela Rubatto
- 2021 - Sergey V. Krivovichev
- 2022 - Cin-Ty Lee
- 2023 - Razvan Caracas
- 2024 - Fabrizio Nestola

== See also ==
- List of geology awards
