= Frank S. Spear =

American petrologist

- Education: Amherst College (BA, 1971); University of California, Los Angeles (PhD, 1976)
- Awards: Dana Medal (2008); Murchison Medal (2012); Walter H. Bucher Medal (2024); Penrose Medal (2026)
- Scientific career
- Fields: Metamorphic Petrology
- Workplaces: Rensselaer Polytechnic Institute
- Doctoral advisor: W. Gary Ernst

Frank Spear is an American metamorphic petrologist, with particular expertise in the evolution of the Earth’s crust, and the quantification and modelling of pressure, temperature, time and deformation histories of metamorphic rocks. His work has been recognised with many awards, including the Dana Medal of the Mineralogical Society of America; the Murchison Medal of the Geological Society of London, the Walter H. Bucher Medal of the American Geophysical Union and the Penrose Medal of the Geological Society of America.

== Education ==
Spear studied geology at Amherst College for his bachelors degree, and then moved to the University of California, Los Angeles for his doctoral research. He completed a thesis on the stability of amphiboles under the guidance of petrologist Gary Ernst.

== Career ==
After completing his PhD, Spear was a research fellow at the Geophysical Laboratory at the Carnegie Institution, Washington, and then took up a faculty position at the Massachusetts Institute of Technology in 1978. In 1985, Spear moved to the Rensselaer Polytechnic Institute.

In 2008, Spear was awarded the Dana medal of the Mineralogical Society of America in recognition of his work on the petrology of metamorphic rocks. In presenting the award, geologist Matthew Kohn listed three of Spear’s qualities as ‘looking inside the box before you think outside it’; 'having a sense of humour' and ‘being persistent’. He also noted that Spear’s work had been instrumental in starting the field of the quantitative analysis of the pressure – temperature – time histories of metamorphic rocks, and their use in tectonic studies.

== Book ==
Spear is best known for his Big Blue Book on metamorphic phase equilibria, which was first published in 1993 and so-called on account of its colour and size.

Spear, F.S. (1993). Metamorphic Phase Equilibria and Pressure-Temperature-Time Paths. Washington, D.C.: Mineralogical Society of America. p. 799. ISBN 0-939950-34-0.

== Selected awards ==
- N.L. Bowen Award, American Geophysical Union (1997)
- Dana Medal of the Mineralogical Society of America (2007)
- Fellow, American Geophysical Union (2007)
- Murchison Medal, Geological Society of London (2012)
- Barrow Award, Metamorphic Studies Group, Mineralogical Society of the UK and Ireland (2023)
- Walter H. Bucher Medal of the American Geophysical Union (2024)
- Penrose Medal of the Geological Society of America (2026)
