= Steefel =

Steefel is a surname. Notable people with this surname include:

- Carl Steefel, American geoscientist
- Genevieve Fallon Steefel (1899-1971), American civic leader
- Jeffrey Steefel (born 1961), American actor and video game creator
