= Patrick Cordier =

Patrick Cordier may refer to:

- Patrick Cordier (alpinist)
- Patrick Cordier (mineralogist)
