= George R. Rossman =

American mineralogist and academic (1944–2026)

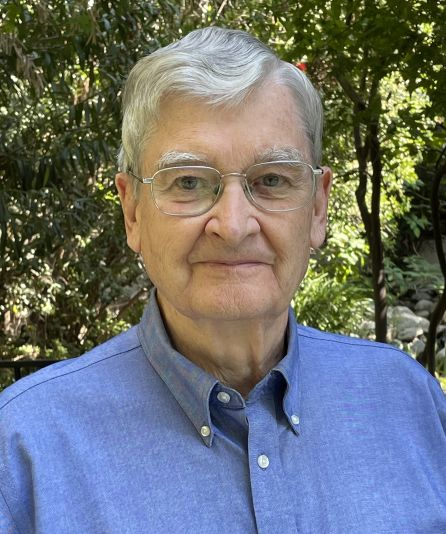
- Born: August 3, 1944; La Crosse, Wisconsin, U.S.
- Died: February 6, 2026 (aged 81)
- Education: University of Wisconsin–Eau Claire; California Institute of Technology
- Scientific career
- Fields: Mineralogy; gemology; inorganic chemistry
- Workplaces: California Institute of Technology
- Doctoral advisor: Harry B. Gray

George Robert Rossman (August 3, 1944 – February 6, 2026) was an American mineralogist and academic who was the Professor of Mineralogy at the California Institute of Technology.

== Early life and education ==
Rossman was born on August 3, 1944, in LaCrosse, Wisconsin, but soon moved to Eau Claire. His father owned a dental laboratory.

He graduated as the salutatorian from high school in Eau Claire. In high school, he participated in the Wisconsin Junior Academy of Science competitions winning first place in the 1961 competition. He attended the Wisconsin State University–Eau Claire (now the University of Wisconsin–Eau Claire) from 1962 to 1966 where he received a Bachelor of Science degree majoring in both Chemistry and Mathematics. He graduated summa cum laude, with honors in Chemistry. From there, he moved to Pasadena, California, where he obtained a PhD in chemistry from California Institute of Technology in 1971. He specialized in inorganic chemistry in the research group of Professor Harry B. Gray.

== Career ==
Immediately upon graduating with his PhD in 1971, he became an instructor in the Division of Geological and Planetary Sciences at Caltech and was soon thereafter appointed assistant professor of Mineralogy and Chemistry. He was Professor of Mineralogy at Caltech.

== Teaching ==
At Caltech, Rossman regularly taught the introductory mineralogy course, a course in mineral spectroscopy, and a course in oral presentation. He supervised the optical mineralogy course, co-taught analytical methods in geochemistry, and presented guest lectures in advanced inorganic chemistry. He was recognized by students and faculty with the Richard P. Feynman Prize for Excellence in Teaching.

== Research ==
Rossman studied mineral spectroscopy, water and hydroxide in nominally anhydrous solids, analytical methods for OH analysis in minerals, X-ray amorphous minerals, and the effects of exposure on minerals to background levels of natural radiation. Paul Asimow, describing Rossman's work, wrote, "Within the general rubric of mineral spectroscopy, Rossman's work can be grouped into three principal categories: the origin of color, the effects of natural and artificial radiation damage, and the concentration and crystal chemistry of hydrogen in minerals both hydrous and nominally anhydrous." In 2026, Rossman was the most-published author in the journal American Mineralogist, with 115 papers.

== Death ==
Rossman died on February 6, 2026, at the age of 81.

== Honors ==
- 2024, a third mineral species in the tourmaline family, fluor-rossmanite, is named for its relationship to rossmanite, which was named after him.
- 2021 awarded the Roebling Medal from the Mineralogical Society of America
- 2020 A second mineral species of the tourmaline family, alumino-oxy-rossmanite, is named after rossmanite, which is named after him
- 2014, awarded The Lifetime Excellence Award, University of Wisconsin–Eau Claire
- 2005, awarded The Friedrich-Becke Medal of the Austrian Mineralogical Society
- 2004, awarded The Richard P. Feynman Prize for Excellence in Teaching, California Institute of Technology
- 2001, awarded the inaugural Dana Medal of the Mineralogical Society of America
- 1998, a mineral species in the tourmaline family, rossmanite, is named after him
- 1980, elected a Fellow of the Mineralogical Society of America

== Selected publications ==
Rossman was author or co-author of more than 380 articles on mineralogy, inorganic chemistry, gemology, and materials science.

- Dawson JW, Gray HB, Hoenig HE, Rossman GR, Schredder JM, Wang RH (1972) A magnetic susceptibility study of hemerythrin using an ultrasensitive magnetometer. Biochemistry 11, 461–465.
- Schugar HJ, Rossman GR, Barraclough CG, Gray HB (1972) Electronic structure of oxo-bridged iron (III) dimers. Journal of the American Chemical Society 94, 2683–2690.
- Goldman DS, Rossman GR, Dollase WA (1977) Channel constituents in cordierite. American Mineralogist 62, 1144–1157.
- Potter RM, Rossman GR (1977) Desert varnish – importance of clay minerals. Science 196, 1446–1448.
- Potter RM, Rossman GR (1979) The manganese and iron oxide mineralogy of desert varnish. Chemical Geology 25, 79–94.
- Potter RM, Rossman GR (1979) Tetravalent manganese oxides – identification, hydration, and structural relationships by infrared-spectroscopy. American Mineralogist 64, 1199–1219.
- Aines RD, Kirby SH, Rossman GR (1984) Hydrogen speciation in synthetic quartz. Physics and Chemistry of Minerals 11, 204–212.
- Aines RD, Rossman GR (1984) Water in minerals – a peak in the infrared. Journal of Geophysical Research 89, 4059–4071.
- Aines, RD; Rossman, GR (1984) The high-temperature behavior of water and carbon-dioxide in cordierite and beryl. American Mineralogist 69, 319–327
- Aines RD, Rossman GR (1984) The hydrous component in garnets. Pyraspites. American Mineralogist, 69, 1116–1126.
- Amthauer G, Rossman GR (1984) Mixed valence of iron in minerals with cation clusters. Physics and Chemistry of Minerals 11, 37–51.
- Kronenberg AK, Kirby SH, Aines RD, Rossman GR (1986) Solubility and diffusional uptake of hydrogen in quartz at high water pressures: implications for hydrolytic weakening. Journal of Geophysical Research 91, 12,723–12,744.
- Miller GH, Rossman GR, Harlow GE (1987) The natural occurrence of hydroxide in olivine. Physics and Chemistry of Minerals 14, 461–472.
- Navon O, Hutcheon ID, Rossman GR, Wasserburg GJ (1988) Mantle-derived fluids in diamond mincro-inclusions. Nature 335, 784–789.
- Rossman GR (1988) Vibrational Spectroscopy of Hydrous Components. In: Hawthorne FC, ed.,
- Yesinowski JP, Eckert H, Rossman GR (1988) High-speed proton MAS-NMR of minerals. Journal of the American Chemical Society 110, 1367–1375.
- Lager GA, Armbruster T, Rotella FJ, Rossman GR (1989) The OH substitution in garnets: X-ray and neutron-diffraction, infrared and geometric-modeling studies. American Mineralogist 74. 840–851.
- Skogby H, Rossman GR (1989) OH in pyroxenes: An experimental study of incorporation mechanisms and stability. American Mineralogist 74, 1059–1069.
- Skogby H, Bell DR, Rossman GR (1990) Hydroxide in pyroxene – variations in the natural-environment. American Mineralogist 75, 764–774.
- Hawthorne FC, Groat LA, Raudsepp M, Ball NA, Kimata M, Spike FD, Gaba R, Halden NM, Lumpkin GR, Ewing RC, Greegor RB, Lytle FW, Ercit TS, Rossman GR, Wicks FJ, Ramik RA, Sherriff BL, Fleet ME, McCammon C (1991) Alpha-Decay damage in natural titanite. American Mineralogist 76, 370–398.
- Rossman GR, Aines RD (1991) The hydrous components in garnets: grossular – hydrogrossular. American Mineralogist 76, 1153–1164.
- Smyth JR, Bell DR, Rossman GR (1991) Incorporation of Hydroxyl in Upper-Mantle Clinopyroxenes. Nature 351, 732–735.
- Woodhead JA, Rossman GR, Silver LT (1991) The metamictization of zircon: Radiation dose-dependent characteristics. American Mineralogist 76, 74–82.
- Bell DR, Rossman GR (1992) The distribution of hydroxyl in garnets from the subcontinental mantle of southern Africa. Contributions to Mineralogy and Petrology, 111, 161–178.
- Shannon RD, Rossman GR (1992) Dielectric constants of silicate garnets and the oxide additivity rule. American Mineralogist 77, 94–100.
- Bell DR, Ininger PD, Rossman GR (1995) Quantitative-analysis of trace OH in garnet and Pyroxenes. American Mineralogist 80. 465–475.
- Libowitzky, E; Rossman, GR (1996) Principles of quantitative absorbance measurements in anisotropic crystals. Physics and Chemistry of Minerals 23, 319–327.
- Rossman GR (1996) Studies of OH in nominally anhydrous minerals. Physics and Chemistry of Minerals 23, 299–304.
- Libowitzky E, Rossman GR (1997) An IR absorption calibration for water in minerals. American Mineralogist 82, 1111–1115.
- Schauble, EA; Rossman, GR; Taylor, HP (2001) Theoretical estimates of equilibrium Fe-isotope fractionations from vibrational spectroscopy. Geochimica et Cosmochimica Acta 65, 2487–2497
- Bell, DR, Rossman GR (2002) Water in Earth's mantle – The role of nominally anhydrous minerals. Science 255, 1391–1397.
- Bell, DR, Rossman GR, Maldener J, Endisch D, Rauch F (2003) Hydroxide in olivine: A quantitative determination of the absolute amount and calibration of the IR spectrum. Journal of Geophysical Research – Solid Earth 108, article 2105
- Johnson EA, Rossman GR (2003) The concentration and speciation of hydrogen in feldspars using FTIR and 1H MAS NMR spectroscopy. American Mineralogist 88, 901–911.
- Bell DR, Rossman GR, Moore RO (2004) Abundance and partitioning of OH in a high-pressure magmatic system: megacrysts from the Monastery kimberlite, South Africa. Journal of Petrology, 45, 1539–1564.
- Schauble E, Rossman GR, Taylor HP (2004) Theoretical estimates of equilibrium chromium-isotope fractionations. Chemical Geology 205, 99–114.
- Mosenfelder JL, Deligne NI, Asimow PD, Rossman GR (2006) Hydrogen incorporation in olivine from 2-12 GPa. American Mineralogist 91, 285–294.
- Boyce, Jeremy W.; Liu, Yang; Rossman, George R.; Guan YB, Eiler JM, Stopper EM, Taylor LA (2010) Lunar apatite with terrestrial volatile abundances. Nature 466, 466–469.
- Tschauner O, Ma C, Beckett JR, Prescher C, Prakapenka V, Rossman GR (2014) Discovery of Bridgmanite, the most abundant mineral in the Earth, in a shocked meteorite. Science 346, 1100–1102. DOI:10.1126/science.1259369
