= Roberta Rudnick =

American geologist

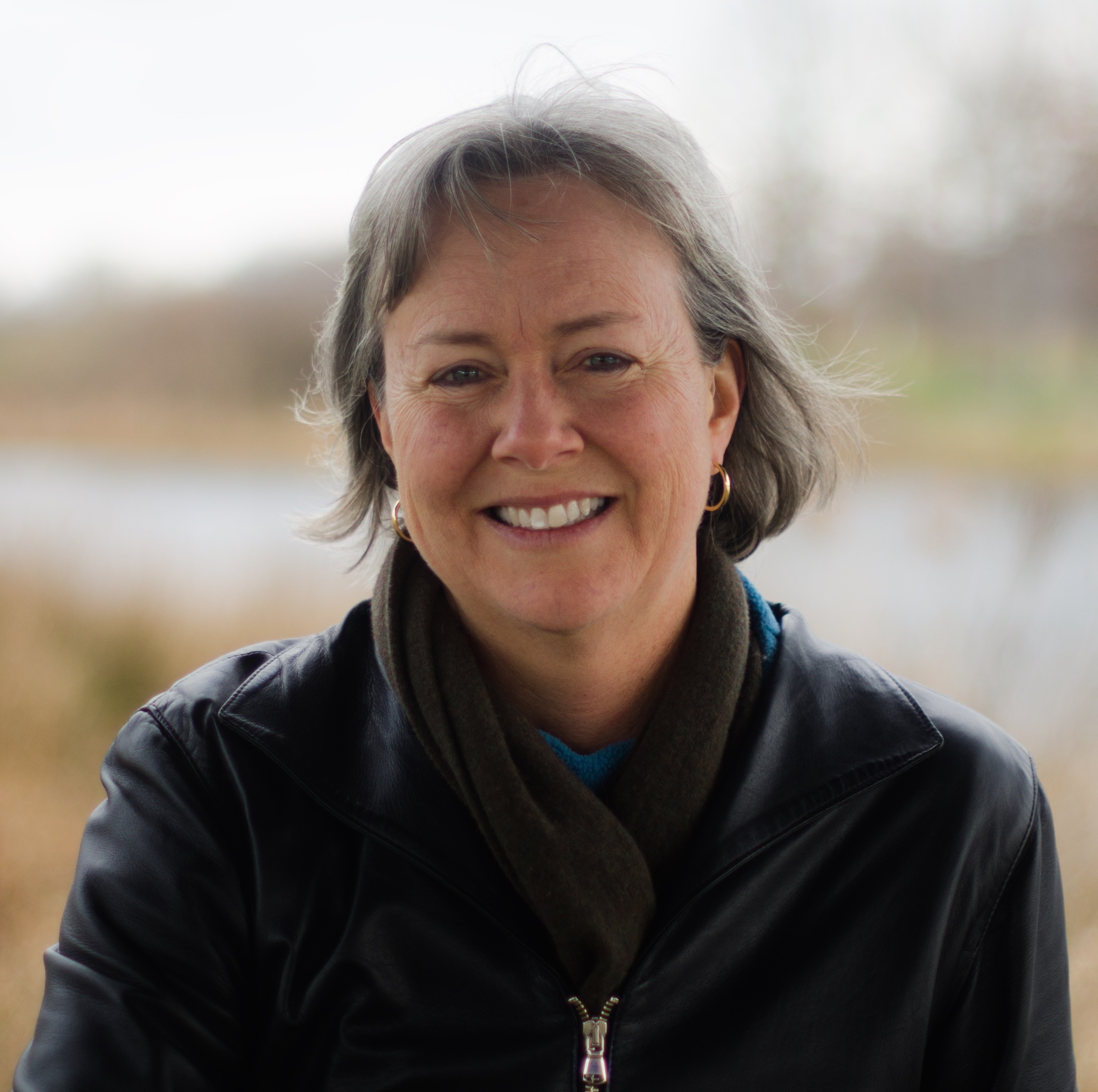
- Born: Roberta L. Rudnick; August 23, 1958 (age 68)
- Education: Portland State University (BS); Sul Ross State University (MS); Australian National University (PhD)
- Spouse: William F. McDonough
- Awards: Dana Medal (2012); Harry H. Hess Medal (2017)
- Scientific career
- Fields: Geology; Geochemistry; Geophysics; Lithium isotopes
- Workplaces: University of California, Santa Barbara; University of Maryland, College Park; Harvard University; Australian National University; Max Planck Institute for Chemistry
- Thesis: The Nature of the lower continental crust (1987)
- Doctoral advisor: Stuart Ross Taylor
- Website: www.geol.ucsb.edu/people/roberta-rudnick

Roberta L. Rudnick (born 1958) is an American earth scientist and professor of geology at the University of California, Santa Barbara. She was elected a member of the National Academy of Sciences in 2010 and was awarded the Dana Medal by the Mineralogical Society of America. Rudnick is a world expert in the continental crust and lithosphere.

== Early life and education ==
Rudnick grew up in Portland, Oregon. She completed her undergraduate studies in earth sciences at Portland State University in 1980. She was only fifty miles from the eruption of Mount St. Helens. After graduating, Rudnick moved to Sul Ross State University for her master's degree, specialising in geology. She worked on the geochemistry of metamorphic rocks in Van Horn, Texas. Her master's thesis was titled the Petrography, Geochemistry and Tectonic Affinities of Meta-Igneous Rocks from the Precambrian Carrizo Mountain Group. In 1988, Rudnick earned her PhD at the Australian National University. Her supervisor, Stuart Ross Taylor, studied the upper continental crust. Rudnick was inspired to study the deep crust below, and chose to investigate granulites. She worked out the chemical composition and depths of xenoliths. Whilst she was a student she used the Sensitive high-resolution ion microprobe (SHRIMP) to date ancient zircons. She identified that granulites were depleted in soluble elements.

== Research and career ==
Rudnick was appointed a von Humboldt postdoctoral fellow at the Max Planck Institute for Chemistry in 1987. She returned to the Australian National University as a research fellow in 1989. She worked with Ian Jackson and Dave Fountain on the lower continental crust. In 1994 Rudnick joined Harvard University as assistant professor, before being promoted to Associate in 1997. Her work on the evolution of the continental crust has been cited over one thousand times. It explored the andesitic composition of continental crust that cannot be produced by basaltic magmatism - the building blocks of the continental crust do not match the edifice. There were several theories that explained the depletion; that the foundering of the magnesium and iron-rich lower crust occurs when tectonic plates force the deep crust to recrystallise, that exposure to air and water causes chemical weathering and that the basaltic oceanic crusts melts when it is subducted. Rudnick believes all three theories could explain the paradox of the composition of the crust. During subduction, ocean crust drops down, producing a series of volcanoes that are basaltic at first and later become non-basalt like. High magnesium rocks concentrate at the bottom.

She joined the University of Maryland, College Park, in 2000. When she arrived at Maryland she began to consider the use of lithium isotopes to study near-surface continental processes. She used lithium isotopes to explore the influence of weathering on the composition of the continental crust. Lithium isotopes allowed her to trace recycling in crusts and other diffusional processes in earth. She demonstrated that reactive transport causes kinetic isotope fractionation. She studied ancient glacial tills and demonstrated that ancient continents were rich in iron and magnesium. She also worked on geoneutrinos, helping physicists at the Sudbury Neutrino Observatory and USArray identify whether neutrinos come from the core, mantle or crust of earth.

Rudnick has served as editor-in-chief of Chemical Geology from 2000 to 2010. In 2012 she was made Department Chair. In 2015 Rudnick joined University of California, Santa Barbara as a Professor of Earth Sciences. There she continued work on using isotope fractionation to understand how chemical weathering of the continental crust has evolved alongside changing atmospheric chemistry. She is working on the concentration of heat producing elements (potassium, thorium and uranium) in the continental crust to estimate the Moho temperature.

=== Awards and honors ===
Rudnick is a member of the American Academy of Arts and Sciences and a foreign member of the Chinese Academy of Sciences. She has received several large grants from the National Science Foundation. Other awards include:

- 2005 - Fellow of the American Geophysical Union
- 2006 - N. L. Bowen award of the American Geophysical Union
- 2010 - Member of the National Academy of Sciences
- 2012 - Dana Medal of the Mineralogical Society of America
- 2017 - Harry H. Hess Medal of the American Geophysical Union
- 2023* - V.M. Goldschmidt Medal of the Geochemical Society
