= Nancy L. Ross =

American geoscientist

- Born: Blacksburg, Virginia

Academic background
- Education: B.Sc., 1979, Virginia Tech; M.Sc., 1981, University of British Columbia; PhD, 1985, Arizona State University

Academic work
- Institutions: Virginia Tech; University College London

Nancy L. Ross is an American geoscientist. She is a professor of mineralogy at Virginia Tech and former head of Department of Geosciences in College of Science.

== Early life and education ==
Ross was born to entomologist Mary H. Ross who "pioneered genetics and behavioral research of the German cockroach" in Blacksburg, Virginia. She completed her Bachelor of Science degree at Virginia Tech in 1979, her Master of Science degree from the University of British Columbia in 1981, and her PhD from Arizona State University in 1985.

== Career ==
Upon completing her PhD, Ross spent 12 years at the University College London before joining the Department of Geological Sciences at Virginia Tech in 2000. Shortly after joining the department, she was named associate dean for research, graduate studies, and outreach in the College of Science at Virginia Tech. She also worked with Ross John Angel to establish Virginia Tech's Crystallography Laboratory which performs X-ray diffraction measurements in support of research programs in chemistry, geosciences, physics, and biological sciences.

In recognition of her academic accomplishments, Ross was named head of Department of Geosciences as a replacement for Ken Eriksson in 2012. Ross was replaced as head of Department of Geosciences in College of Science by Steve Holbrook in 2017.

== Honors ==
In 2023, Ross was elected as a Fellow of the American Association for the Advancement of Science. In 2024, Ross was awarded the Roebling Medal, the highest honor at the Mineralogical Society of America.

Ross was also elected a Fellow of the Geological Society of America in recognition of her "distinguished contributions to the geosciences" and received an honorary fellowships from the Italian Society of Mineralogy and Petrology.
