= Patrick Cordier (mineralogist) =

French mineralogist (born 1961)

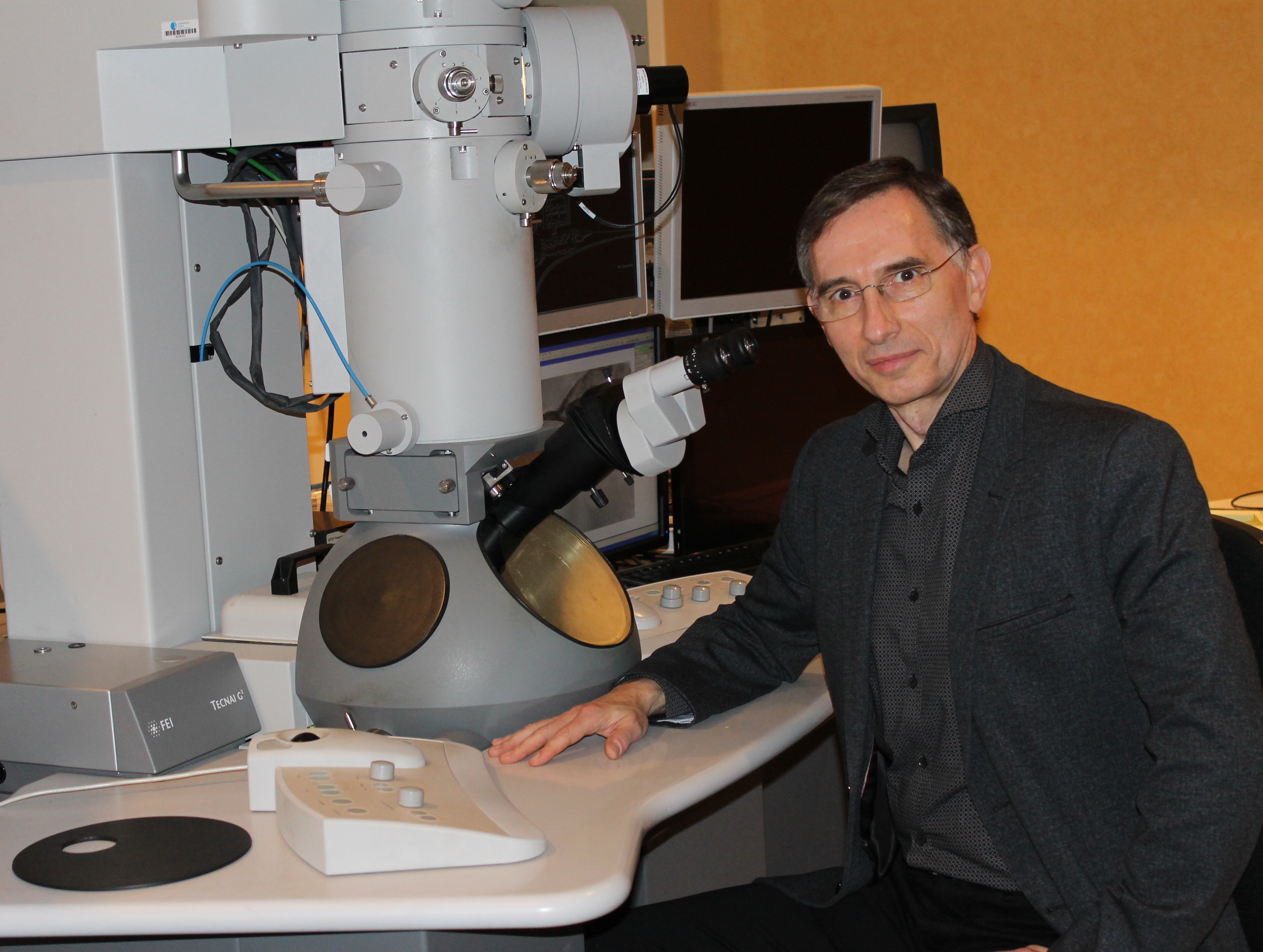
- Born: February 1, 1961 (age 65); Paris, France
- Education: University of Lille I
- Awards: Fellow of the American Geophysical Union (2019); Fellow of the Mineralogical Society of America (1996); Dana Medal of the Mineralogical Society of America (2016); Grand Prix Frédéric Kuhlmann of the Société des Sciences, de l’Agriculture et des Arts de Lille.
- Scientific career
- Fields: Mineralogy, plasticity, Earth sciences
- Workplaces: University of Lille I

Patrick Cordier (born February 1, 1961) is a mineralogist who uses experimental and numerical approaches to study the plasticity of geological materials. He has authored or co-authored over 200 articles in international scientific journals. He received the Dana Medal from the Mineralogical Society of America in 2016, and is currently a chief editor of the European Journal of Mineralogy. and a member ofInstitut Universitaire de France.

== Education ==
Cordier obtained a master's degree in materials science in 1985 from the School of Engineers of Lille (EUDIL), and a DEA from the University of Lille 1 in materials science. He completed a doctoral thesis on the plasticity of quartz, directed by Professor Jean-Claude Doukhan, at the University of Lille 1 in 1989.

== Early career ==
In 1989, Cordier worked as post-doctoral scientist with Professor Arthur Heuer (Department of Materials Science and Engineering, Case School of Engineering, Cleveland, USA). The same year, he joined the University of Lille 1 as an assistant professor. He passed his habilitation to lead scientific research in 1995 at Lille, and became an associate professor of physics in 1996. At the 'Unité Materiaux Transformations' research institute of the University of Lille, he led the research group for Mineral Physics from 1999 to 2017, and the research group for Plasticity from 2017 to 2020.

== Current research ==
Cordier is a specialist in transmission electron microscopy and has devoted himself particularly to the study of crystal defects such as dislocations and the plasticity of minerals. In particular, he studies the plasticity of the high-pressure mineral phases of the Earth's mantle. With Philippe Carrez, he is currently developing an approach to this problem based on multi-scale numerical modelling.

He has regularly visited at the Bayerisches Geoinstitut (Bayreuth, Germany) at the University of Bayreuth since 1998 to carry out deformation experiments at very high pressures and is presently a visiting professor at the Institute of Mechanics, Materials and Civil Engineering of the Université Catholique de Louvain, Belgium.

== Honors ==
Cordier has received French recognition for distinguished service in education (Ordre des Palmes Académiques, Chevalier in 2008; Officier in 2013), and the Grand Prix Frédéric Kuhlmann of the Société des Sciences, de l’Agriculture et des Arts de Lille (SSAAL) in 2015.

He has also been a fellow of the Mineralogical Society of America since 2008 and received the Dana Medal from them in 2016.

In 2019, he became the first French fellow of the American Geophysical Union in the focus group 'Mineral and Rock Physics'. The same year he was elected at Institut Universitaire de France as a senior member.

He is the current president (2018–2020) of the International Mineralogical Association (IMA). He has also served as the first vice-president (2016–2018) of the IMA, and the vice-president (2004–2007) and president (2008–2009) of the French Mineralogical Society (Société Française de Minéralogie et Cristallographie).

He has twice received ERC-Adv grants, for the projects RheoMan (2011–2017) and TimeMan (2018–2022).

In 2022, he was elected a member of the Academia Europaea.

== Bibliography ==
- 2008: P. Cordier, Ce que dissent les minéraux, (Ed. Belin)
- 2010: P. Cordier, Mineralen (Ed. Veen Magazines, Diemen)
- 2016 - A.M. Goryaeva, Ph. Carrez & P. Cordier, Low viscosity and high attenuation in MgSiO_{3} post-perovskite inferred from atomicscale calculations. Scientific Reports, 6, 34771.
- 2014 - P. Cordier, S. Demouchy, B. Beausir, V. Taupin, F. Barou & C. Fressengeas, Disclinations provide the missing mechanism for deforming olivine-rich rocks in the mantle. Nature, 507, 51–56.
- 2012 - P. Cordier, J. Amodeo & Ph. Carrez, Modelling the rheology of MgO under Earth's mantle pressure, temperature and strain-rates. Nature, 481, 177–180.
- 2007 - Ph. Carrez, D. Ferré & P. Cordier, Implications for plastic flow in the deep mantle from modelling dislocations in MgSiO_{3} minerals. Nature, 446(7131), 68–70.
- 2005 - D. Mainprice, A. Tommasi, H. Couvy, P. Cordier & D. Frost, Pressure sensitivity of olivine slip systems and seismic anisotropy of Earth's upper mantle. Nature, 433, 731–733.
- 2004 - P. Cordier, T. Ungár, L. Zsoldos & G. Tichy, Dislocation creep in MgSiO_{3} Perovskite at conditions of the Earth's uppermost lower mantle. Nature, 428, 837–840.
