= Ronald E. Cohen =

Ronald E. Cohen (born 5 March 1957) is an American scientist at the Carnegie Institution for Science's Geophysical Laboratory. He is a theorist who works on understanding materials, ranging from minerals to technological materials like ferroelectrics. Much of his work has centered on materials at extreme conditions, like the high pressures at the center of the Earth, and on transducer materials, used for sonar and medical ultrasound. He is one of the pioneers for applying of first-principles methods to minerals. In first-principles methods, only the atom types are input, and all properties can be computed using quantum mechanics. He also expanded the application of these methods to ferroelectrics, and continues to clarify the origin of ferroelectric and relaxor behavior.

He was awarded the Dana Medal by the Mineralogical Society of America in 2009, and the Mineralogical Society of America Award in 1994. He is a fellow of the American Physical Society (2002), the American Geophysical Union, and the Mineralogical Society of America. He has also contributed to about 200 scientific papers, and has given about 200 invited talks around the world.

He lives in Silver Spring, Maryland with his wife Kathryn. They have three children, Daniel, Jacob, and Rebecca.
