= Ross Taylor (geochemist) =

New Zealand geochemist (1925–2021)

Ross Taylor AC
- Born: Stuart Ross Taylor; 26 November 1925; Ashburton, New Zealand
- Died: 23 May 2021 (aged 95); Canberra, Australian Capital Territory, Australia
- Education: Canterbury University College (BSc,1948; MSc, 1951); Indiana University Bloomington (PhD, 1954)
- Known for: NASA Principal Investigator 1970–1990, lunar geochemistry
- Awards: V. M. Goldschmidt Award (1993); G. K. Gilbert Award (1994); Walter H. Bucher Medal (2002); Companion of the Order of Australia (2008); Shoemaker Distinguished Lunar Scientist Award (2012)
- Scientific career
- Fields: cosmochemistry, planetary science, geochemistry
- Workplaces: Australian National University
- Thesis: Geochemistry of some New Zealand igneous and metamorphic rocks (1953)
- Doctoral advisor: Brian Mason
- Doctoral students: Roberta Rudnick

Stuart Ross Taylor AC (26 November 1925 – 23 May 2021) was a New Zealand geochemist and planetary scientist known for his studies of the geology of the Moon through lunar samples, the continental crust, tektites and the evolution of the Solar System. He was an emeritus professor and Visiting Fellow at the Australian National University in Canberra. He died in Canberra on 23 May 2021 at the age of 95.

== Honours and awards ==
- 5670 Rosstaylor, a main-belt asteroid discovered in 1985.
- Shoemaker Distinguished Lunar Scientist Award, 2012
