= Frankhawthorneite =

Monoclinic copper tellurate mineral

General
- Category: Tellurate mineral
- Formula: Cu_{2}Te^{6+}O_{4}(OH)_{2}
- IMA symbol: Fht
- Strunz classification: 4.FD.25
- Dana classification: 33.1.4.1
- Crystal system: Monoclinic
- Crystal class: Prismatic (2/m) (same H-M symbol)
- Space group: P2_{1}/n

Identification
- Color: Medium leaf-green
- Fracture: Uneven
- Tenacity: Brittle
- Mohs scale hardness: 3–4
- Luster: Vitreous
- Streak: Pale leaf-green
- Diaphaneity: Transparent
- Specific gravity: 5.43
- Refractive index: 2.00

Frankhawthorneite Cu_{2}Te^{6+}O_{4}(OH)_{2} is a monoclinic copper tellurate mineral (space group P2_{1}/n) named after Prof. Frank Christopher Hawthorne (born 1946), University of Manitoba, Winnipeg, Canada. It was discovered at Centennial Eureka Mine, Tintic District, East Tintic Mountains, Juab County, Utah, in 1995. It has a leaf green color.

== See also ==
- List of minerals named after people
