= Ross John Angel =

British mineral researcher (born 1959)

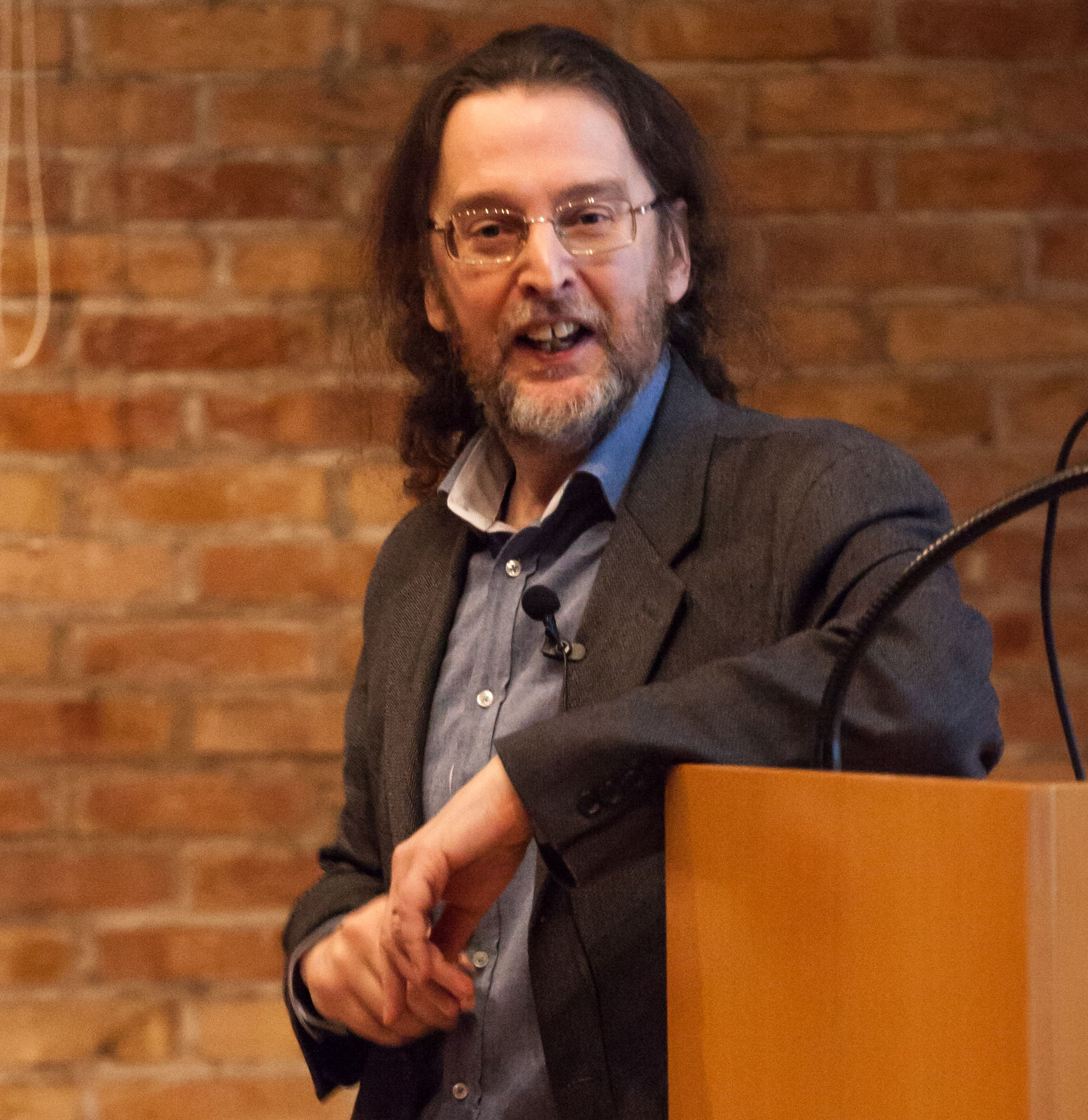
- Angel in 2021
- Born: October 26, 1959 (age 66); Croydon, England
- Education: University of Cambridge, Cambridge, United Kingdom
- Awards: Fellow of the Mineralogical Society of America (1991); Phillips Crystallography Award of the British Crystallographic Association (1991); Max Hey Award of the Mineralogical Society of Great Britain and Ireland (1993); Medal for Research Excellence of the European Mineralogical Union (1998); Dana Medal of the Mineralogical Society of America (2011).
- Scientific career
- Fields: Mineralogy, crystallography, earth sciences
- Institutions: Institute of Geosciences and Geo-resources National Research Council, Padova, Italy

Ross John Angel (born October 26, 1959) is a researcher in mineralogy, expert in crystallography and elastic properties of geological materials and key industrial materials, which he studies with experimental and analytical approaches. He is the lead author or co-author of over 240 articles in international scientific journals, he received the Dana Medal from the Mineralogical Society of America in 2011 and is currently a director of research at the Institute of Geosciences and Geo-resources of the National Research Council (Italy).

== Education ==
Angel was educated at the Trinity School of John Whitgift Croydon and then at Clare College, Cambridge in the University of Cambridge. He obtained his Bachelor of Arts in Mineral Sciences in 1982, and his Master of Arts and PhD in 1986, all from the University of Cambridge.

== Career ==
Angel won a NATO Overseas Research Fellowship and joined Prof. Charles Prewitt's group at the Stony Brook University in 1985 to develop new analysis methods to determine the crystal structures of incommensurate minerals. When Prewitt was appointed director of the Geophysical Laboratory of the Carnegie Institution of Washington, now known as Carnegie Institution for Science, Angel moved with him. At the Geophysical Laboratory staff members Robert Hazen and Larry Finger trained him in high-pressure crystallography. Angel was part of the team that determined the crystal structures of the first high-temperature super-conductors in 1987,

In 1988 Angel won a 1983 University Research Fellowship from the Royal Society to work at University College London under the direction of David Price (British academic), and in 1994 was appointed to the staff at the Bayerisches Geoinstitut, directed by Friedrich Seifert, at the University of Bayreuth, in Bayreuth, Germany. In 2001 he was appointed research professor in crystallography at Virginia Tech in the US and with Nancy L. Ross founded the Virginia Tech Crystallography Laboratory which performs X-ray diffraction measurements in support of research programs in chemistry, geosciences, physics, and biological sciences,

In 2011, Angel held a Mercator Professorship of the German Research Foundation at the Mineralogisch-Petrographisches Institut of the University of Hamburg in Germany and then moved to Italy to work in the Department of Earth Sciences of the University of Padova (2011–2017). After two years on the faculty at the Department of Earth and Environmental Sciences of the University of Pavia, in 2019 he joined the Institute of Geosciences and Geo-resources of the National Research Council (Italy) in Padova, Italy where he is now a director of research.

== Current research ==
Angel has developed and established novel methods for single-crystal diffraction, at extreme conditions in order to characterize and understand the fundamental relationships between the atomic-scale structures and properties of materials. The software that he has developed for controlling single-crystal X-ray diffractometers, and processing of data is distributed as freeware and is in use by many research groups world-wide. With colleagues he is developing elasticity theory and methods to measure the stress and strain of inclusions inside host minerals in order to determine the pressures and temperatures at which they were trapped deep inside the Earth.

== Honors ==
Angel has been the recipient of major honors at both national and international levels.

United-Kingdom: Angel received the Phillips Crystallography Award of the British Crystallographic Association in 1991 and in 1993 the first Max Hey Award of the Mineralogical Society of Great Britain and Ireland.

International: Angel has been a fellow of the Mineralogical Society of America since 1991. He received the Medal for Research Excellence of the European Mineralogical Union (1998). More recently, he received the Dana Medal from the Mineralogical Society of America in 2011

Angel is also involved in the mineralogy community by serving as:

- Councilor of the International Mineralogical Association (IMA) (2021–present)
- Technical editor for crystal structures, American Mineralogist (2013–2021)
- Member of the Editorial Advisory board of Physics and Chemistry of Minerals (2020–present)
- Member of the Editorial Advisory board of Zeitschrift für Kristallographie – Crystalline Materials (2013–present)
- Councilor of the Mineralogical Society of America (2005–2007)
- Associate editor of the European Journal of Mineralogy

== Publications ==
Selected notable scientific publications in international journals.

- Angel RJ, Chopelas A, Ross NL (1992) Stability of high-density clinoenstatite at upper-mantle pressures. Nature 358:322-324.
- Angel RJ, Allan DR, Miletich R, Finger LW (1997) The use of quartz as an internal pressure standard in high-pressure crystallography. Journal of Applied Crystallography 30:461-466.
- Angel RJ (2000) Equations of state. In RM Hazen and RT Downs (eds.), High-pressure and high-temperature crystal chemistry. Reviews in Mineralogy and Geochemistry, 41:35-60.
- Angel RJ, Bujak M, Zhao J, Gatta GD, Jacobsen SD (2007) Effective hydrostatic limits of pressure media for high-pressure crystallographic studies. Journal of Applied Crystallography 40:26-32.
- Angel RJ, Gonzalez-Platas J, Alvaro M (2014) EosFit-7c and a Fortran module (library) for equation of state calculations. Zeitschrift für Kristallographie, 229, 405–419.
