= Titanium in zircon geothermometry =

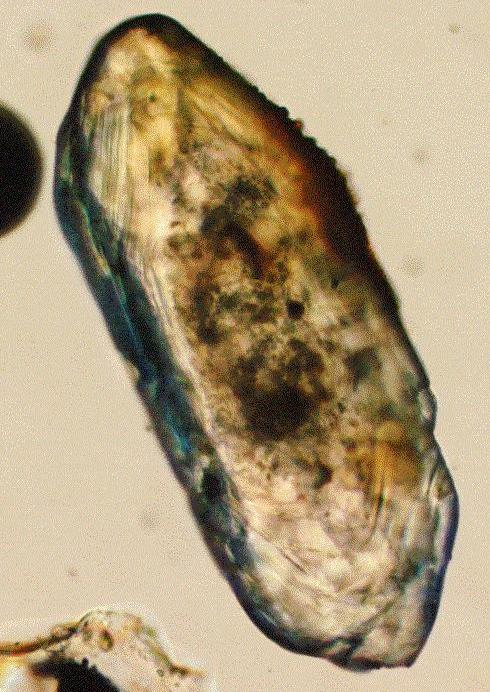
Zircon crystal about 250 μm long (optical microscope photograph)

Titanium in zircon geothermometry is a form of a geothermometry technique by which the crystallization temperature of a zircon crystal can be estimated by the amount of titanium atoms which can only be found in the crystal lattice. In zircon crystals, titanium is commonly incorporated, replacing similarly charged zirconium and silicon atoms. This process is relatively unaffected by pressure and highly temperature dependent, with the amount of titanium incorporated rising exponentially with temperature, making this an accurate geothermometry method. This measurement of titanium in zircons can be used to estimate the cooling temperatures of the crystal and infer conditions during which it crystallized. Compositional changes in the crystals growth rings can be used to estimate the thermodynamic history of the entire crystal. This method is useful as it can be combined with radiometric dating techniques that are commonly used with zircon crystals (see zircon geochronology), to correlate quantitative temperature measurements with specific absolute ages. This technique can be used to estimate early Earth conditions, determine metamorphic facies, or to determine the source of detrital zircons, among other uses.

== Zircon ==
A unit cell of zircon. Arrows point to the possible substitution locations for titanium atoms. Yellow spheres represent silicon atoms, grey spheres represent zirconium atoms.

Plot of Ti abundance (log of Ti ppm) versus Temperature in Celsius. Simplified version, modified from Watson and Harrison 2005.

Zircon ((Zr_{1–y}, REE_{y})(SiO_{4})_{1–x}(OH)_{4x–y})) is an orthosilicate mineral that is commonly found as an accessory mineral throughout Earth's crust. Due to its crystal structure and geochemistry, zircon is a commonly analyzed mineral because of its utility for geologists as a geochronometer and geothermometer.

Chemically, zircon is a particularly useful mineral because of its ability to incorporate many trace elements. Many of these elements can be used for radiometric dating to provide an age for the crystal. It is known to exchange uranium, thorium and rare earth elements (REE) such as yttrium, and lutetium. However, the chemical potential energies of these REE substitutions are not well understood, so they are not suitable for determining crystallization temperatures. Titanium is also incorporated into zircon, and its exchange rates has been studied in detail. Ti^{4+}, a tetravalent ion, can replace Zr^{4+} or Si^{4+} in a temperature dependent mechanism. For zircons in the presence of TiO_{2}, i.e. the mineral rutile, this substitution process is common and can be measured. Zircon is also useful because its incorporation of other elements like uranium, lutetium, samarium, and oxygen can be analyzed to provide further insight into the age and conditions the crystal grew under.

Thermally, zircon is resistant to temperature changes and extremes. It is stable up to 1690 °C at ambient pressure and has a low thermal expansion rate. Zircon crystals are also some of the most incompressible silicate minerals. The high durability of zircons also allows them to crystallize around other silicate minerals, creating pockets, or inclusions, of surrounding melts that are indicative of magma at specific pressures and temperatures. This essentially forms a time-capsule giving a glimpse of past conditions in which the crystal formed.

Zircons are known to be relatively retentive of their incorporated isotopes and thus very useful for microquantitative studies. Cations such as REE, U, Th, Hf, Pb, and Ti diffuse slowly out of zircons, and their measured quantities in the mineral are diagnostic of the melt conditions surrounding the crystal during growth. This slow rate of diffusion of many of the incorporated elements makes zircon crystals more likely to form compositional zoning, which may represent oscillatory zoning or sector zoning, as the melt composition or energy conditions change around the crystal over time. These zones show compositional differences between the core and rim of the crystal, providing observable evidence of changes in melt conditions. Slow diffusion rates also prevent contamination by leaking or loss of isotopes from the crystal, increasing the likelihood that chronologic and compositional measurements are accurate.

== Methods ==
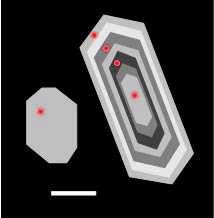
Simplified diagram version of unzoned (left) and zoned (right) zircons. Red dots represent ion microprobe scan locations. White bar is about 50 μm.

This section will review the process of measuring the titanium content of zircons, beginning with sample collection, mineral separation, mounting for microprobe analysis, and ending with the microquantitative element analysis. Once a rock has been collected, zircons are extracted using a series of techniques such as using a sieve, heavy liquid, shaking table, and magnetic separation to separate minerals based on differing densities and properties. Zircon crystals are then mounted to an epoxy or metal disc-shaped slide, where they can be shaved to about half thickness to reveal their internal structure. From here, they can be imaged using cathodoluminescence to make any zonations in the mineral visible. If zonation is apparent, multiple measurements of Ti abundance can be taken from the center to the rim to give the temperature evolution of the crystal.

The final step involves measuring the abundance of titanium in a specific location on a zircon crystal with an ion microprobe. For this, the chemical composition of the zircons is measured using secondary ion mass spectrometry. The sample is bombarded with a beam of primary ions, and the charge and mass of the ejected secondary ions are measured to determine the chemical composition at the point of contact. The quantitative value for titanium content is then compared to a known relationship of titanium incorporation and temperature to determine the crystallization temperature of that zone of the zircon. The titanium-to-temperature relationship was calculated using in situ radiometrically dated zircons with known melt temperatures from the surrounding rock. This titanium-in-zircon measurement can be done several times in zoned zircons, which may record the temperature evolution that resulted from many geologic events.

== Uses ==
Using this technique, the crystallization temperatures of zircons can be estimated to estimate the cooling temperature of the crystal. Geothermometry techniques like this can provide evidence for changes in temperature in various environments, the thermodynamic evolution of rocks, the gradual change in the geothermal gradient over geologic time, and determine provenance of detrital sediments. Coupled with geochronology techniques that measure using radiometric decay to age date a rock, such as with U/Pb decay, these paleotemperature measurements can be paired with an absolute age in order to determine temperature changes over time.

Titanium in zircon geothermometry has so far been used in igneous rocks to estimate cooling temperatures of magma from zircon crystals dated to the Hadean age (>4.0 Ga). Low crystallization temperatures from zircons of this age suggest the Hadean Earth contained liquid water, which reduced the cooling temperature of crustal materials. Potentially, titanium-in-zircon thermometry of Earth's oldest zircons can show the progressive heat loss from a magmatic Hadean Earth to the onset of plate tectonics as the planet's crust began to cool and underwent plastic deformation. This will provide previously unknown evidence for the conditions in early Earth and allow testing of ideas of how the planet evolved through the Hadean and Archean eons.

Titanium-in-zircon geothermometry can be used in zircons found in metamorphic rocks to estimate the pressure and temperatures conditions during metamorphism. This helps identify the metamorphic facies and thus the geologic setting of a rock formation. It can also be used in sedimentary rocks to help determine the source of detrital minerals. However, these crystals may sometimes be contaminated by external titanium seeping into fractures.

== Errors and limitations ==
Titanium-in-zircon geothermometry is considered to be a relatively reliable and accurate method of determining crystallization temperatures of zircons, with an error of only 10-16 degrees Celsius. However, there are several limitations and assumptions used in this technique that increase the margin of error.

The major constraint of this technique is that it is only usable in systems that contain titanium, or the mineral rutile (TiO_{2}). In systems that have no or very little titanium, this method is pointless, as zircons will not incorporate titanium if it is not present in the magmatic melt. However, recent models have taken into account zircon's ability to replace either silicon or zirconium in the crystal with titanium by using independent activities of silicon and zircon. This has expanded the potential uses for zircons with unknown origins, due to the abundance of silicon in Earth's crust. In some zircon crystals, inclusions of the mineral quartz (SiO_{2}) can be used as proof that silicon was present during crystallization, thus validating the use of this geothermometer.

Due to the abundance of radioactive elements that can be incorporated into zircons, they are also susceptible to damage from radioactive decay through the process of metamictization. As radioactive elements within the crystal lattice decay, they bombard the interior of the crystal with radioactive particles. This weakens the crystal and leave it fractured or destroyed. This increases the chance of isotopes leaking out of the crystal and affecting titanium, or other elements, measurements.

Another difficulty with this microanalysis is the contamination of titanium on external surfaces. Recent studies have expressed concern over the gold coating on the surface of the ion microprobe mounts, which contains small amounts of titanium (~1 ppm) that could provide an error during measurement. In detrital zircons found in sedimentary sources, a titanium-bearing oxide coating on the surface and in fractures of zircons can also contaminate the crystal with excess titanium.

More recent studies have also shown that there are additional unknown factors that contribute to Ti incorporation in zircons. The chemical activity of SiO_{2}, pressure variance, disequilibrium crystallization from melts, late crystal growth in hydrous melts, or non-Henry's Law substitution in zircon crystals all may play a role in altering predicted crystallization temperatures.

This technique is also constrained by several assumptions that, while valid, may prove inconsistent in certain situations. Laboratory studies have used constant pressures when calculating cooling temperatures and have assumed that pressure does not play a major role in titanium incorporation. When estimating cooling temperatures, increased pressure is accounted for by increased temperature estimates and thus increases the uncertainty of the estimates.
