= Carl Steefel =

American geoscientist

- Born: Minneapolis, Minnesota
- Education: Washington University in St Louis; University of Colorado Boulder; Yale University
- Occupation: Geoscientist
- Employer: Lawrence Berkeley National Laboratory
- Known for: Reactive transport
- Awards: Phi Beta Kappa (1974); R&D 100 CrunchFlow (2017); AGU Fellow (2019); Berkeley Lab Director’s Award for Lifetime Achievement (2026)
- Website: crunch.lbl.gov

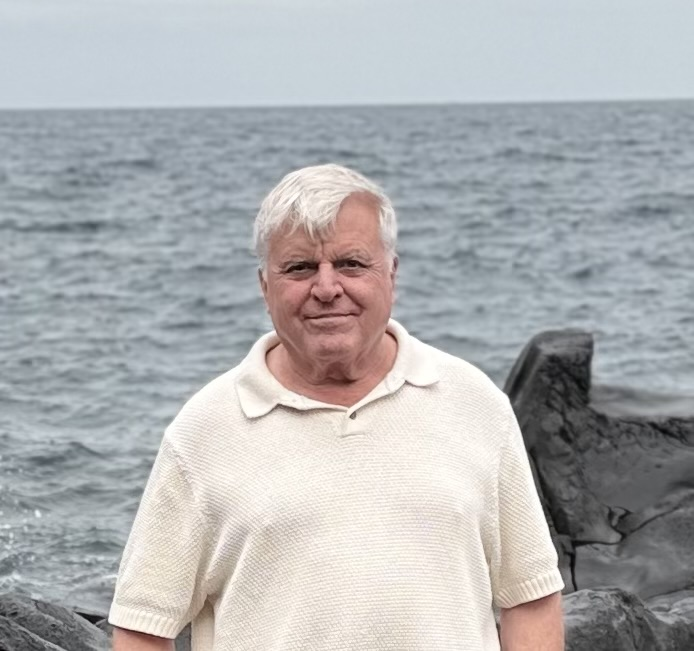
Carl Steefel September 2025

Carl Steefel is an American geoscientist. He is a senior scientist in the Energy Geosciences Division at Berkeley Laboratory.

Steefel is a Fellow of American Geophysical Union. In 2023, a session was held in his honor at the Goldschmidt Conference.

== Education and early career ==
Steefel earned a Bachelor of Arts in English literature from Washington University in St. Louis in 1974. In 1976, he worked as a Manuscripts librarian at the Huntington Library, and in 1978, he held the position of Geological Assistant at the United States Geological Survey's Branch of Exploration Research. Between 1979 and 1985, he worked as a Geologist at Anaconda Minerals while earning his Master of science in Geology from the University of Colorado Boulder in 1982. In 1985, he assumed Teaching and Research Fellowships at the Yale University Department of Geology and Geophysics, which he held until 1991. Subsequently, he was appointed as a Post-Doctoral Associate at the Mineralogisch-Petrographisches Institut, Universität Bern, where he worked until 1993. During this time, he also earned an M.Phil. in Geology in 1987 and a Doctor of Philosophy in Geochemistry in 1991, both from Yale University.

== Later career ==
From 1993 to 1995, Steefel worked as a Research Scientist in the Interfacial Geochemistry Group at Battelle Pacific Northwest Laboratories, where he was later designated as a Senior Research Scientist in 1995. He was also employed as an assistant professor of Geology at the University of South Florida between 1995 and 1998. Subsequently, he was appointed as a staff scientist in the Environmental Science Division at Lawrence Livermore National Laboratory. In 2004, he left Lawrence Livermore National Laboratory and joined Lawrence Berkeley National Laboratory as a staff scientist in 2004, becoming a senior scientist in 2012. In 2016, he was appointed department head for Geochemistry in the Earth and Environmental Sciences Area.

Steefel is the Principal Developer of the CrunchFlow Reactive Transport software, which received an R&D 100 Award.

== Research ==
Steefel's research has focused on reactive transport modeling, high-performance computing, machine learning, kinetic treatments of water-rock interaction, and geochemistry; In 1990, alongside Philippe Van Cappellen, he documented how the kinetic modeling approach provided the understanding of water-rock interaction by incorporating nucleation, precursors, and Ostwald ripening. Later, in a study, he developed a coupled multi-dimensional model for multi-species transport and kinetic precipitation-dissolution reactions in single-phase hydrothermal systems. With Kate Maher, he applied reactive transport modeling in 2009 to address the reconciliation of laboratory and field rates of chemical weathering.

In 1996, Steefel co-edited and authored a chapter in a Reviews in Mineralogy volume on "Reactive Transport in Porous Media" with Peter Lichtner and Eric Oelkers. and worked as Lead Editor and author for a second Reviews in Mineralogy and Geochemistry volume on "Pore-Scale Geochemical Processes" in 2015.

In 2012, Steefel co-authored with Sergi Molins and David Trebotich a study of pore-scale reaction rates using the high-performance computing code Chombo-Crunch.

In 2019, Steefel co-authored with Christophe Tournassat a study of ion transport in clay and clay-rocks with consideration of electrostatic effects. A second follow-on study considered ion migration in fractured clay-rich media.

In 2022 he co-authored with Mengsu Hu a study of carbon trapping in mafic rocks under partially saturated flow conditions. In 2021, Steefel co-authored with Mengsu Hu a study of chemo-mechanical pressure solution processes in salt rock contributing to salt creep.

== Awards and honors ==
- 2019 – Fellow, American Geophysical Union (AGU)
- 2020 – Director's Award for Exceptional Achievement, Lawrence Berkeley National Laboratory

== Selected articles ==
- Steefel, C. I.; Van Cappellen, P. (1990). "A new kinetic approach to modeling water-rock interaction: The role of nucleation, precursors, and Ostwald ripening". Geochimica et Cosmochimica Acta. 54 (10): 2657–2677. Bibcode:1990GeCoA..54.2657S. doi:10.1016/0016-7037(90)90003-4.
- Steefel, C. I.; Lasaga, A. C. (1994). "A coupled model for transport of multiple chemical species and kinetic precipitation/dissolution reactions with application to reactive flow in single phase hydrothermal systems". American Journal of Science. 294 (5): 529–592. Bibcode:1994AmJS..294..529S. doi:10.2475/ajs.294.5.529.
- Steefel, C. I.; Lichtner, P. C. (1994). "Diffusion and reaction in rock matrix bordering a hyperalkaline fluid-filled fracture". Geochimica et Cosmochimica Acta. 58 (17): 3595–3612. Bibcode:1994GeCoA..58.3595S. doi:10.1016/0016-7037(94)90152-X.
- Steefel, C. I.; Lichtner, P. C.; Oelkers, E. H. (1996). Steefel, C. I.; Lichtner, P. C.; Oelkers, E. H. (eds.). "Reactive transport in porous media". Mineralogical Society of America. 34: 1–28. doi:10.1515/9781501509797-002.
- Steefel, C. I.; McQuarrie, K. T. B. (1996). "Approaches to modeling of reactive transport in porous media". Reviews in Mineralogy. 34: 83–130. doi:10.1515/9781501509797-005.
- Steefel, C. I.; DePaolo, D. J.; Lichtner, P. C. (2005). "Reactive transport modeling: An essential tool and a new research approach for the Earth sciences". Earth and Planetary Science Letters. 240 (3–4): 539–558. doi:10.1016/j.epsl.2005.09.017.
- Li, L.; Steefel, C. I.; Yang, L. (2008). "Scale dependence of mineral dissolution rates within single pores and fractures". Geochimica et Cosmochimica Acta. 72 (2): 360–377. Bibcode:2008GeCoA..72..360L. doi:10.1016/j.gca.2007.10.027.
- Maher, K.; Steefel, C. I.; White, A. F.; Stonestrom, D. A. (2009). "The role of reaction affinity and secondary minerals in regulating chemical weathering rates at the Santa Cruz Soil Chronosequence, California". Geochimica et Cosmochimica Acta. 73 (10): 2804–2831. Bibcode:2009GeCoA..73.2804M. doi:10.1016/j.gca.2009.01.030. OSTI 951793.
- Steefel, C. I.; Appelo, C. A. J.; Arora, B.; Jacques, D.; Kalbacher, T.; Kolditz, O.; Yeh, G. T. (2015). "Reactive transport codes for subsurface environmental simulation". Computational Geosciences. 19 (3): 445–478. Bibcode:2015CmpGe..19..445S. doi:10.1007/s10596-014-9443-x.
- Steefel, C. I.; Beckingham, L. E.; Landrot, G. (2015). "Micro-continuum approaches for modeling pore-scale geochemical processes". Reviews in Mineralogy and Geochemistry. 80 (1): 217–246. Bibcode:2015RvMG...80..217S. doi:10.2138/rmg.2015.80.07.
- Molins, Sergi; Trebotich, David; Steefel, Carl; Shen, Chaopeng (2012). "An investigation of the effect of pore scale flow on average geochemical reaction rates using direct numerical simulation". Water Resources Research. 48 (3) 2011WR011404. Bibcode:2012WRR....48.3527M. doi:10.1029/2011WR011404.
- Tournassat, Christophe; Steefel, Carl (2019). "Reactive Transport Modeling of Coupled Processes in Nanoporous Media". Reviews in Mineralogy and Geochemistry. 85 (1): 75–109. Bibcode:2019RvMG...85...75T. doi:10.2138/rmg.2019.85.4.
- Steefel, Carl; Tournassat, Christophe (2021). "A model for discrete fracture-clay rock interaction incorporating electrostatic effects on transport". Computational Geosciences. 25 (1): 395–410. Bibcode:2021CmpGe..25..395S. doi:10.1007/s10596-020-10012-3.
- Steefel, Carl; Hu, Mengsu (2022). "Reactive Transport Modeling of Mineral Precipitation and Carbon Trapping in Discrete Fracture Networks". Water Resources Research. 58 (9) e2022WR032321. Bibcode:2022WRR....5832321S. doi:10.1029/2022WR032321. OSTI 1902917.
- Hu, Mengsu; Steefel, Carl; Rutqvist, Jonny (2021). "Microscale Mechanical-Chemical Modeling of Granular Salt: Insights for Creep". Journal of Geophysical Research: Solid Earth. 126 (12) e2021JB023112. Bibcode:2021JGRB..12623112H. doi:10.1029/2021JB023112.
