= Ewingite =

Most structurally complex known mineral on Earth

General
- Category: Organic mineral
- Formula: Mg_{8}Ca_{8}(UO_{2})_{24}(CO_{3})_{30}O_{4}(OH)_{12}·138H_{2}O
- IMA symbol: Ewg
- Crystal system: Tetragonal
- Crystal class: 4/mmm (4/m 2/m 2/m) - Ditetragonal Dipyramidal

Identification
- Color: Yellow
- Other characteristics: Radioactive

Ewingite is a complex hydrous uranyl carbonate mineral of magnesium and calcium. Its chemical formula is Mg_{8}Ca_{8}(UO_{2})_{24}(CO_{3})_{30}O_{4}(OH)_{12} · 138 H_{2}O. It was discovered by Jakub Plášil of the Institute of Physics at the Academy of Sciences of the Czech Republic in the Plavno mine, Czech Republic. Travis Olds of the University of Notre Dame and colleagues described ewingite, which is the most structurally complex known mineral on Earth. Ewingite is named in honor of Rodney C. Ewing, Professor of Geological Sciences at Stanford University, USA.

The mineral is rare, due to its very narrow pH and compositional range required for formation, which are only known to occur in the Plavno mine. Ewingite forms through uranium oxidation occurring in the humid environment of the mine.

The mineral is chemically similar to rabbittite, swartzite, and albrechtschraufite.

The type specimen of ewingite has been placed in the mineralogy collections at the Natural History Museum of Los Angeles County.

== Localities ==
Czech Republic : Plavno mine, Jáchymov District, Krušné Hory Mountains, Karlovy Vary Region, Bohemia
