= Garnet-biotite geothermometry =

Garnet-biotite geothermometry is a method used to evaluate the peak temperature at which metamorphic rocks have formed. Geothermometry makes up one component of geothermobarometry, which also includes the evaluation of pressure (geobarometry). There are many geothermometers, but garnet-biotite is particularly useful because of the frequent occurrence of biotite and garnet together in medium grade metamorphic rocks. The garnet biotite thermometer correlates temperature with the partitioning of Fe and Mg in coinciding garnet and biotite. The garnet-biotite thermometer has been "calibrated" many times since the 1970s by both experimental and empirical methods, however Ferry and Spear's 1978 experimental calibration study is reported thoroughly and commonly cited. Given a rock containing both garnet and biotite, an equilibrium constant (K_{D}) can be found simply by using microprobe analysis. Then, by comparing the found K_{D} value to the calculated garnet-biotite geothermometer, the peak temperature of rock formation can be determined.

== Experimental petrology ==
Determining the temperature and/or pressure of formation of metamorphic rocks began as a mostly qualitative science. Pelitic index minerals were used to estimate the metamorphic grade of rocks, and the relative conditions of metamorphism across an area.

Experimental petrology has allowed researchers to move beyond the qualitative approach and employ quantitative methods. Experimental petrology consists of modeling natural geological systems at different temperatures and pressure in a lab setting. One quantitative method derived from experimentation is geothermobarometry. Geothermobarometry allows for the calculation of equilibrium temperatures and pressures from measured distributions of elements between coexisting phases. Geothermobarometry encompasses both geothermometry (concerning temperature) and geobarometry (concerning pressure).

== Calibrating the garnet-biotite exchange geothermometer ==
Ferry and Spear's calculation of the garnet-biotite geothermometer (1978), involved running experimental reactions between biotite and garnet at a constant pressure (0.207 GPa) and varying temperatures between 500 °C and 800 °C. The focus of the reactions was on the Fe-Mg exchange:

Fe_{3}Al_{2}Si_{3}O_{12} + KMg_{3}AlSi_{3}O_{10}(OH)_{2} = Mg_{3}Al_{2}Si_{3}O_{12} + KFe_{3}AlSi_{3}O_{10}(OH)_{2}

Ferry and Spear (1978) used a garnet solid solution of almandine and pyrope (All_{90}Prp_{10}) with an iron mole fraction of X_{Fe} = 0.9 for all reactions. Varying biotite compositions (from X_{Fe} = 0.5 to X_{Fe} = 1.0) were selected based on the known bracket of the equilibrium distribution for Mg and Fe that corresponded with the garnet composition. To compensate for the slow nature of garnet equilibration in metamorphic settings, a ratio of 98:2 garnet to biotite was used. Using an excess of garnet forced the biotite do the majority of the work to reach the equilibrium value (K_{D}), expediting the reaction process. Experiments were run for 13 to 56 days to ensure enough time to reach equilibrium.

The resulting data from the experiments (final biotite composition and Fe / Mg concentration) were used to calculate an equilibrium constant (K_{D}) at each reaction temperature. Specific data and figures can be found in Winter (2010) and Ferry and Spear (1978). The relationship between the inverse of temperature (1/K) and the natural log of K_{D} plots as a straight line. Additionally, a linear regression of the data fits the same trend line, indicating a valid geothermometer.

Experimental Calculation of Equilibrium Constant: K_{D} = (X_{Mg}/X_{Fe})^{Grt}/(X_{Mg}/X_{Fe})^{Bt} Linear Regression of data: lnK_{D} = -2109 / T + 0.782

Isopleths plotted on a P-T diagram of various K_{D} values are nearly vertical. This indicates that the garnet-biotite reaction is much more susceptible to temperature, and relatively insensitive to pressure (another line of evidence for a good geothermometer)

In summary, Ferry and Spear (1978) created a graph that plots K_{D} values versus temperature for the garnet-biotite exchange reaction. K_{D} values of garnet and biotite in rock samples can be easily determined using microprobe analysis. So, given a rock containing garnet and biotite, the temperature of formation can be determined by finding the K_{D} value, and comparing it to the calculated trend line.

== Limitations ==
Pressure: The Ferry and Spear (1978) calibration was performed at a constant pressure of 0.207 GPa, making varying pressure a limitation for an accurate calculation. However, Spear argues that the garnet-biotite geothermometer is relatively insensitive to pressure changes, and can apply to rocks at any mid-crustal level. This pressure insensitivity is demonstrated by plotting K_{D} isopleths for the garnet-biotite exchange reaction against pressure (y-axis) and temperature (x-axis). The isopleths plot nears vertical, indicating the relative insignificance of pressure.

Non-ideal minerals: Ferry and Spear (1978) used idealized biotite and garnet compositions. As nothing is perfect in nature, Ca can be found in garnet, and Al and Ti can be found in biotite. Consequently, while this geothermometer is useful for rocks found in the greenschist or amphibolite metamorphic facies, it is not as useful for rocks in other facies with higher Ca-garnets and mixed biotites. Several calibrations have been completed that take into account the non-ideal nature of minerals (see below).

== Applications ==
Geothermometry plays a role in determining the tectonic history of rocks and geologic regions all over the world.

== Other calibration studies ==
The garnet-biotite geothermometer has been calibrated in numerous studies since the 1970s.

- Thompson (1976)
- Goldman and Albee (1977)
- Ferry and Spear (1978)
- Perchuk and Lavrent'eva (1981)
- Hodges and Spear (1982)
- Pigage and Greenwood (1982)
- Ganguly and Saxena (1984)
- Indares and Martignole (1985)
- Chipera and Perkins (1988)
- Berman (1990)
- Perchuk (1991)
- Bhattacharya et al. (1992)
- Patino Douce et al. (1993)
- Kleeman and Reinhardt (1994)
- Kullerud (1955)
- Alcock (1996)
- Holdaway et al. (1997)
- Gessmann et al. (1997)
- Holdaway (2000, 2004)
- Kaneko and Miyano (2003)

== See also ==
- Geothermobarometry
- Metamorphic Rocks
- Petrology
