= Reviews in Mineralogy and Geochemistry =

- Language: English
- Edited by: Ian Swainson

Publication details
- Former name(s): Mineralogical Society of America Short Course Notes, Reviews in Mineralogy
- History: 1974-present
- Frequency: Irregular

Standard abbreviations
- ISO 4: Rev. Mineral. Geochem.

Indexing
- ISSN: 1529-6466
- LCCN: 00214630
- OCLC no.: 807776152

Links
- Journal homepage

Reviews in Mineralogy and Geochemistry is the official review journal of the Mineralogical Society of America and The Geochemical Society. It was established in 1974 as Mineralogical Society of America Short Course Notes and renamed to Reviews in Mineralogy in 1980. It obtained its present name in 2000.

== Abstracting and indexing ==
The journal is abstracted and indexed in GeoRef, Scopus, and Science Citation Index Expanded.
