= Daniela Rubatto =

Italian geochemist

Daniela Rubatto is a Professor of geochemistry at the University of Bern, Switzerland. Her areas of interest and expertise are in isotope geochemistry, metamorphic petrology, mineralogy, tectonics, inorganic geochemistry, and geochronology.

== Education ==
Daniela Rubatto was born in Italy and obtained a master's degree in Geological Sciences at the University of Torino, Italy in 1994, and a PhD at the Institute for Isotope Geology and Mineral Resources, ETH Zurich, Switzerland in 1998.

== Career ==
In 1998 Rubatto and her partner Joerg Hermann were awarded Fellowships from the Swiss National Science Foundation and moved to Australia to continue their research in earth sciences at the Australian National University (ANU), Canberra, Australia. At ANU, she has held the positions of Postdoctoral Fellow, Research School of Earth Sciences (RSES), 1998–2002, APD-Fellow, Dep. of Geology, 2002–2004, QEII Fellow, RSES, 2005–2010, Associate Professor RSES, 2010–present and QEII Fellow, RSES, 2011–2015. In the period 2013–2015 she was also Associate Director High Degree Research at RSES. In 2015 she moved back to Switzerland to join the Institute of Geological Sciences at the University of Bern, and she also holds a part-time appointment as senior researcher at the Institute de Sciences de la Terre at the University of Lausanne, Switzerland.

In her research she combines geochronology with trace element geochemistry and petrology in studying the behaviour of accessory minerals during metamorphism, particularly at high pressure and temperature. This research has integrated advanced analytical methods (e.g. SHRIMP ion microprobe) with experimental petrology and field studies to investigate rates of metamorphic processes, mountain building and the migration of fluids in the crust.

== Honours and awards ==
In 1994 Rubatto was awarded a First-class degree in geological science, and in 1998 an ETH medal for outstanding PhD thesis. She won the J G Russell Award from the Australian Academy of Science, Canberra in 2005, and then in 2009, the Dorothy Hill Medal from the Australian Academy of Science. In 2010 she won the Top Supervisor Award from the ANU, Canberra. In 2016-2017 she was selected as Mineralogical Society of America distinguished lecturer; in 2017 she was elected Fellow of the Mineralogical Society of America; and in 2018 Honorary Fellow of the Italian Society of Mineralogy and Petrology. In 2019 Professor Rubatto was awarded the Robert Wilhelm Bunsen Medal from the European Geosciences Union. In 2020 Professor Rubatto was awarded the prestigious Dana medal.

Professor Rubatto has been awarded numerous scholarships. In 1998–1999 she received a Postdoctoral Fellowship from the Swiss National Science Foundation to work at RSES, ANU. This was followed in 2000–2002 with a Postdoctoral Fellowship from the Institutes of Advanced Studies at RSES, ANU. After this was an ARC-Australian Postdoctoral Fellowship at RSES, ANU, 2002–2004, then in 2005–2009 and again in 2011–2015, an ARC-Queen Elizabeth II Fellowship at RSES, ANU.
