= Jeremy Burdett =

British-American theoretical chemist (1947–1997)

Jeremy Keith Burdett
- Born: July 1, 1947; London, UK
- Died: June 23, 1997 (aged 49); Kalamazoo, Michigan, USA
- Education: University of Cambridge; University of Michigan
- Scientific career
- Workplaces: Newcastle University; Cornell University; University of Chicago
- Doctoral advisor: Jim J. Turner
- Other academic advisors: Roald Hoffmann

Jeremy Keith Burdett (July 1, 1947 – June 23, 1997), or Jeremy K. Burdett, was a British-American chemist known for his work on bridging the gap between molecular science and solid state chemistry from an electron orbital viewpoint.

== Education and career ==
Burdett was a native of London, UK. He studied at the Magdalene College, University of Cambridge, receiving his bachelor's degree in 1968 in natural sciences with a specialization in chemistry. He obtained a master's degree from the University of Michigan in 1970 and worked as a Power Foundation Fellow with Jerry Current. He returned to the University of Cambridge and received a Ph.D. in 1972 under the supervision of Jim J. Turner. Subsequently, Burdett moved to Newcastle University along with Jim J. Turner's group and was appointed senior research officer. In 1977, Burdett spent a sabbatical at Cornell University with Roald Hoffmann, who greatly influenced Burdett's research direction. In 1978, Burdett joined the faculty at the University of Chicago, where he spent the rest of his career.

== Honors and awards ==
Burdett received the following accolades during his career,

- Meldola Medals of the Royal Society of Chemistry (1977) along with Martyn Poliakoff
- Alfred P. Sloan Foundation Fellow (1979)
- Camille and Henry Dreyfus Foundation Teacher Scholar
- Fellow of the John Simon Guggenheim Memorial Foundation (1990)
- Wilsmore Fellow of the University of Melbourne (1985)
- CNRS Visiting professor at the Universite de Paris-Sud, Orsay (1987) and at University of Rennes 1 (1994)
- Tilden Medal and Prize of the Royal Society of Chemistry (1995).

== Personal life ==
Burdett's first wife was Wendy Greenwood, with whom he had two sons, Rufus and Harry. Burdett died at his summer home in Kalamazoo, Michigan, after attending a conference in Ann Arbor, Michigan.

== Bibliography ==
=== Reviews ===
- Burdett, Jeremy K. (1970). "Electronic Relaxation and Molecular Vibrations". Applied Spectroscopy Reviews. 4 (1): 43–95. Bibcode:1970ApSRv...4...43B. doi:10.1080/05704927008081695. ISSN 0570-4928.
- Burdett, J. K.; Poliakoff, M.; Turner, J. J.; Dubost, H. (1976). "Vibrational energy levels in matrix isolated species". Advances in Infrared and Raman Spectroscopy. 2: 1–52. OCLC 1101442714.
- Burdett, Jeremy K. (1978-10-01). "Matrix isolation studies on transition metal carbonyls and related species". Coordination Chemistry Reviews. 27 (1): 1–58. doi:10.1016/S0010-8545(00)80352-5. ISSN 0010-8545.
- Burdett, Jeremy K. (1982), "Predictions of the Structure of Complex Solids", in Prigogine, I.; Rice, Stuart A. (eds.), Advances in Chemical Physics, vol. 49, Hoboken, NJ, USA: John Wiley & Sons, Inc., pp. 47–113, doi:10.1002/9780470142691.ch2, ISBN 978-0-470-14269-1
- Burdett, Jeremy K. (1982-02-01). "New ways to look at solids". Accounts of Chemical Research. 15 (2): 34–39. doi:10.1021/ar00074a001. ISSN 0001-4842.
- Burdett, Jeremy K. (1984-01-01). "From bonds to bands and molecules to solids". Progress in Solid State Chemistry. 15 (3): 173–255. doi:10.1016/0079-6786(84)90002-5. ISSN 0079-6786.
- Burdett, Jeremy K. (1987). "Some structural problems examined using the method of moments". Solid State Chemistry. Structure and Bonding. 65. Berlin, Heidelberg: Springer: 29–90. doi:10.1007/BFb0004458. ISBN 978-3-540-47464-7.
- Burdett, Jeremy K. (1988). "Perspectives in structural chemistry". Chemical Reviews. 88 (1): 3–30. doi:10.1021/cr00083a001. ISSN 0009-2665.
- Burdett, Jeremy K. (1992), "Electronic paradoxes in the structures of minerals", in Price, Geoffrey D.; Ross, Nancy L. (eds.), The Stability of Minerals, The Mineralogical Society Series, vol. 3, Dordrecht: Springer Netherlands, pp. 88–131, doi:10.1007/978-0-585-27578-9_3, ISBN 978-0-585-27578-9
- Burdett, Jeremy K. (1992-01-01), "Some Structural-Electronic Aspects of High Temperature Superconductors", in Prigogine, I.; Rice, Stuart A. (eds.), Advances in Chemical Physics, vol. 83, Hoboken, NJ, USA: John Wiley & Sons, Inc., pp. 207–261, doi:10.1002/9780470141410.ch4, ISBN 978-0-470-14141-0
- Burdett, Jeremy K. (1994-01-01). "Some aspects of the metal–insulator transition". Chemical Society Reviews. 23 (5): 299–308. doi:10.1039/CS9942300299. ISSN 1460-4744.
- Burdett, Jeremy K.; Mitchell, John F. (1995). "Nonstoichiometry in early transition metal compounds with the rocksalt structure". Progress in Solid State Chemistry. 23 (2): 131–170. doi:10.1016/0079-6786(95)00001-B.
- Burdett, Jeremy K. (1996-01-01). "Electronic Structure and Properties of Solids". The Journal of Physical Chemistry. 100 (31): 13263–13274. doi:10.1021/jp953650b. ISSN 0022-3654.
- Burdett, Jeremy K.; Rodgers, John R. (2011-12-15), "Structure & Property Maps for Inorganic Solids", in Scott, Robert A. (ed.), Encyclopedia of Inorganic and Bioinorganic Chemistry, Chichester, UK: John Wiley & Sons, Ltd, pp. eibc0212, doi:10.1002/9781119951438.eibc0212, ISBN 978-1-119-95143-8

=== Books ===
- Burdett, Jeremy K. (1980). Molecular shapes : theoretical models of inorganic stereochemistry. New York: Wiley. ISBN 0-471-07860-3. OCLC 6356196.
- Albright, Thomas A.; Burdett, Jeremy K. (1992). Problems in molecular orbital theory. New York: Oxford University Press. ISBN 0-19-507175-1. OCLC 26303741.
- Jean, Yves; Volatron, François; Burdett, Jeremy K. (1993). An introduction to molecular orbitals. New York: Oxford University Press. ISBN 0-19-506918-8. OCLC 27266237.
- Burdett, Jeremy K. (1995). Chemical bonding in solids. New York: Oxford University Press. ISBN 0-19-508991-X. OCLC 30625190.
- Burdett, Jeremy K. (1997). Chemical bonds : a dialog. Chichester: Wiley. ISBN 0-471-97129-4. OCLC 37158484.
- Albright, Thomas A.; Burdett, Jeremy K.; Whangbo, Myung-Hwan (2013). Orbital interactions in chemistry (2nd ed.). Hoboken, New Jersey. ISBN 978-0-471-08039-8. OCLC 823294395.
