= Ronald C. Cohen =

American environmental scientist

Ronald Cohen is an American chemist and environmental scientist. His work focuses on atmospheric chemistry and greenhouse gasses. In addition to his academic career, Cohen has served in government roles and used his research to inform science-based policy.

== Education ==
Cohen earned his Bachelor of Arts in 1985 from Wesleyan University. He then received his PhD in chemistry from the University of California, Berkeley in 1991. His thesis advisor was Richard Saykally. While in graduate school, Cohen focused on fundamental physical chemistry. Upon completion of his PhD, he was a postdoctoral fellow at Harvard University, and then stayed on as a research associate at Harvard. While at Harvard, Cohen shifted his research to focus on atmospheric science.

== Academic career ==
In 1995, Cohen joined the faculty at University of California, Berkeley. He began as an assistant professor of Chemistry and of Earth and Planetary Science. He was promoted to the rank of associate professor in 2002 and to full professor in 2007. From 2022 to 2025, Cohen was Associate Dean of UC Berkeley's College of Computing, Data Science, and Society. Throughout his career, Cohen has published over 340 peer-reviewed articles, focusing mainly on atmospheric science. These include observations clarifying the role of organic nitrates, the role of temperature and nitrogen oxides as controls over high ozone events, the role of the biosphere in removal of nitrogen oxides from the atmosphere, use of space-based remote sensing to understand urban nitrogen oxide chemistry, and the use of sensor networks to characterize trends in urban greenhouse gas emissions.

== Other Work ==
Cohen served as the Director of Greenhouse Gas Measurement, Monitoring, Reporting, and Verification for the Office of Science and Technology Policy during the Biden Administration. Here, he was charged with implementing the National strategy to advance an integrated U.S. Greenhouse gas measurement, monitoring and information system.

From 2022 to 2024 Cohen served as the Chief Technology Officer for Secured Carbon, a company focused on financing projects to reduce greenhouse gas emissions.

== Awards and honors ==
In 1998, Cohen received the Regent Junior Faculty Fellowship. In 1999, he received the Hellmen fellowship at UC Berkeley. In 2012 Cohen was named an American Geophysical Union Fellow. He was named a fellow of the American Association for the Advancement of Science in 2017. He has also received many awards from NASA, including group achievement awards.
