= American Mineralogist =

American mineralogy journal

American Mineralogist: An International Journal of Earth and Planetary Materials
- Discipline: Mineralogy, petrology, crystallography, geochemistry
- Language: English
- Edited by: Don Baker, Hongwu Xu

Publication details
- History: 1916–present
- Publisher: Mineralogical Society of America (United States)
- Frequency: 8/year
- Impact factor: 3.003 (2020)

Standard abbreviations
- ISO 4: Am. Mineral.

Indexing
- CODEN: AMMIAY
- ISSN: 0003-004X (print); 1945-3027 (web)
- LCCN: 19012811
- OCLC no.: 01480430

Links
- Journal homepage; Online access; Online archive

American Mineralogist: An International Journal of Earth and Planetary Materials is a peer-reviewed scientific journal covering the general fields of mineralogy, crystallography, geochemistry, and petrology. It is an official journal of the Mineralogical Society of America, publishing both subscription and open access articles. The journal is a hybrid open-access journal. The editors-in-chief are Hongwu Xu (Los Alamos National Laboratory), and Don Baker (McGill University).

== History ==
The journal was established in 1916, with the first issue appearing in July of that year, under the auspices of the Philadelphia Mineralogical Society, the New York Mineralogical Club, and the Mineral Collectors' Association. On December 30, 1919, the Mineralogical Society of America was formed and American Mineralogist became the society's journal.

== Abstracting and indexing ==
The American Mineralogist is abstracted and indexed in Chemical Abstracts, the Science Citation Index, GeoRef, and INSPEC. According to Journal Citation Reports, the journal has a 2011 impact factor of 2.100.

== Crystallographic database ==
A database, the "American Mineralogist Crystal Structure Database", of all crystal structures published in American Mineralogist, Canadian Mineralogist, European Journal of Mineralogy and Physics and Chemistry of Minerals (Note: The opening page of the database has updated information about data sources and affiliations.) is maintained and hosted at the University of Arizona with the Mineralogical Society of America, and the Mineralogical Society of Canada.
