= Mineralogical Society of America =

Scientific organization promoting mineralogy

- Abbreviation: MSA
- Formation: December 30, 1919; 106 years ago
- Type: Scientific society
- Legal status: Not-for-profit 501(c)(3)
- Purpose: To advance mineralogy, crystallography, geochemistry, and petrology
- Headquarters: Chantilly, VA
- President: Sarah Penniston-Dorland (2025)
- Vice President: Robert J. Bodnar (2025)
- Main organ: American Mineralogist
- Website: msaweb.org

The Mineralogical Society of America (MSA) is a scientific membership organization. MSA was founded in 1919 for the advancement of mineralogy, crystallography, geochemistry, and petrology, and promotion of their uses in other sciences, industry, and the arts. It encourages fundamental research about natural materials; supports the teaching of mineralogical concepts and procedures to students of mineralogy and related arts and sciences; and attempts to raise the scientific literacy of society with respect to issues involving mineralogy. The Society encourages the general preservation of mineral collections, displays, mineral localities, type minerals and scientific data. MSA represents the United States with regard to the science of mineralogy in any international context. The Society was incorporated in 1937 and approved as a nonprofit organization in 1959.

== Publications ==
- American Mineralogist: An International Journal of Earth and Planetary Materials, is the print journal of the Society, and it has been published continuously since 1916. It publishes the results of original scientific research in the fields of mineralogy, crystallography, geochemistry, and petrology with the goal of providing readers with the best in earth science research.
- Reviews in Mineralogy is a series of multi-authored, soft-bound books containing cogent and concise reviews of the literature and advances about a subject area. Since 1974, 86 volumes have been published.
- The Lattice is a quarterly newsletter first published in 1985 and contains business items as well as general information for members.
- Elements: An International Magazine of Mineralogy, Geochemistry, and Petrology is co-published by this society along with other geochemical and mineralogical societies.

== Special Interest Groups ==
MSA's special interest groups are composed of individuals who have informally joined to organize review volumes, meetings, workshops, etc. There are Special Interest Groups for:

- Pegmatites
- Planetary Materials

== Awards and Grants ==
As the representative Society for the profession, the Mineralogical Society of America recognizes outstanding contributors to the fields of mineralogy, crystallography, geochemistry, and petrology. Society awards do not require MSA membership or United States citizenship.

- Roebling Medal First awarded in 1937, the Roebling Medal is the Society's highest honor. It is given in recognition of an individual's lifetime scientific eminence as represented primarily by publication of outstanding original research in mineralogy. The recipient is made a life fellow of the Society and receives both a 14K and bronze medal engraved bearing their engraved name and the resemblance of Washington A. Roebling. Washington Roebling was Chief Engineer during construction of the Brooklyn Bridge, a mineral collector, and a significant friend of the Society in its early years. Roebling gave the society a gift of $40,000 in bonds which became the Roebling Fund and has grown to over $1.5 million.
- Distinguished Public Service Medal This award is presented to an individual who has provided outstanding contributions to public policy and awareness about mineralogical topics through science. Established in 1990, the award is a silver medal with the logo of the Society and vignettes of the application of mineralogy to the general good.
- Mineralogical Society of America Award This award is presented to an individual for an outstanding single or series of published contributions in the areas of mineralogy, crystallography, geochemistry, petrology, or related fields. The award is meant to recognize a scientist beginning their career. The recognized research must have been performed prior to the recipient's 35th birthday or prior to the seventh year past Ph.D., and the award given no more than two years afterwards. The award is a certificate, Fellow status, and a life membership.
- Dana Medal This award is presented to a mid-career individual for outstanding single or series of published contributions in the areas of mineralogy, crystallography, geochemistry, petrology, or related fields.
- MSA Undergraduate Prize The Society recognizes outstanding undergraduate students enrolled in mineralogical courses nominated by their department with a certificate, a year's student membership, and an MSA publication of their choice. One student per department may be nominated annually provided the nominating department offers at least one course in crystallography, mineralogy, or petrology, and a member of the faculty is a member of fellow of the Society.
- MSA Grant for Research in Crystallography The Society makes an annual award of up to US$5,000.00 for student research in the field of mineralogical crystallography. Both undergraduate and graduate student members of MSA are eligible to apply. More information is on the MSA website at www.minsocam.org.
- MSA Grant for Research in Mineralogy and Petrology The Society makes two annual awards of up to US$5,000.00 for student research in the field of mineralogy and petrology. Both undergraduate and graduate student members of MSA are eligible to apply. More information is on the MSA website at www.minsocam.org.

== Membership ==
Membership in the Society is open to any person interested in mineralogy and related sciences regardless of residence or citizenship. Individuals from all 50 states, the District of Columbia, and about 40 countries belong to the Society, giving it and its publications an international readership.

== Annual meeting ==
The MSA annual business meeting with the members, as well as award and social functions of the society, are held in conjunction with the annual Geological Society of America meeting.
