= GMMR =

GMMR is a four-letter acronym that can mean the following:

- Greater Mumbai Metropolitan Region in India
- Great Manmade River in Libya.
