= Geology of the Gambia =

The geology of the Gambia is defined by thick and comparatively recent sequences of sediments and sedimentary rocks, deposited in the last 66 million years. The country is underlain almost entirely by geologically recent Cenozoic sedimentary rocks. Much deeper basement rocks are likely present, although they are not well understood. Most research has focused on oil and groundwater exploration.

== Stratigraphy ==
The oldest rock units recognized in the west of the country, along the Gambia River are sandstones and kaolinitic claystones from the Oligocene, Miocene or Pliocene. Ironstone, including iron oxides, gravel, clay and sand dating to the Pleistocene are found in the east of the Gambia, while coastal sands, salt, silt and clay are common dating to the Holocene.

== Hydrogeology ==
The British Geological Survey reports that the Gambia has extensive surface water which is rarely used for drinking water. At the mouth of river, high salinity is a problem in surface water supplies. The shallow sand aquifer encompasses almost the entire country, made up of Holocene sediments and an underlying, partially confined Pliocene aquifer. The sand aquifer ranges between five and 25 meters thick. The country also has a deep sandstone aquifer, with fossil water as much as 40,000 years confined at depths of 250 to 450 meters. Out of a total storage of 650,000 cubic meters only 80,000 cubic meters is believed to be potable.

== Natural resource geology ==
Petroleum geologists have launched several thousand kilometers of seismic surveys throughout the basin in search of hydrocarbons, but exploration has so far been unsuccessful. In the 1950s, mining began for beach sands rich in titanium, containing large concentrations of ilmenite, zircon, rutile and gangue minerals. The country has large deposits of glass-grade sand that have not been mined.
