= Climate change in Libya =

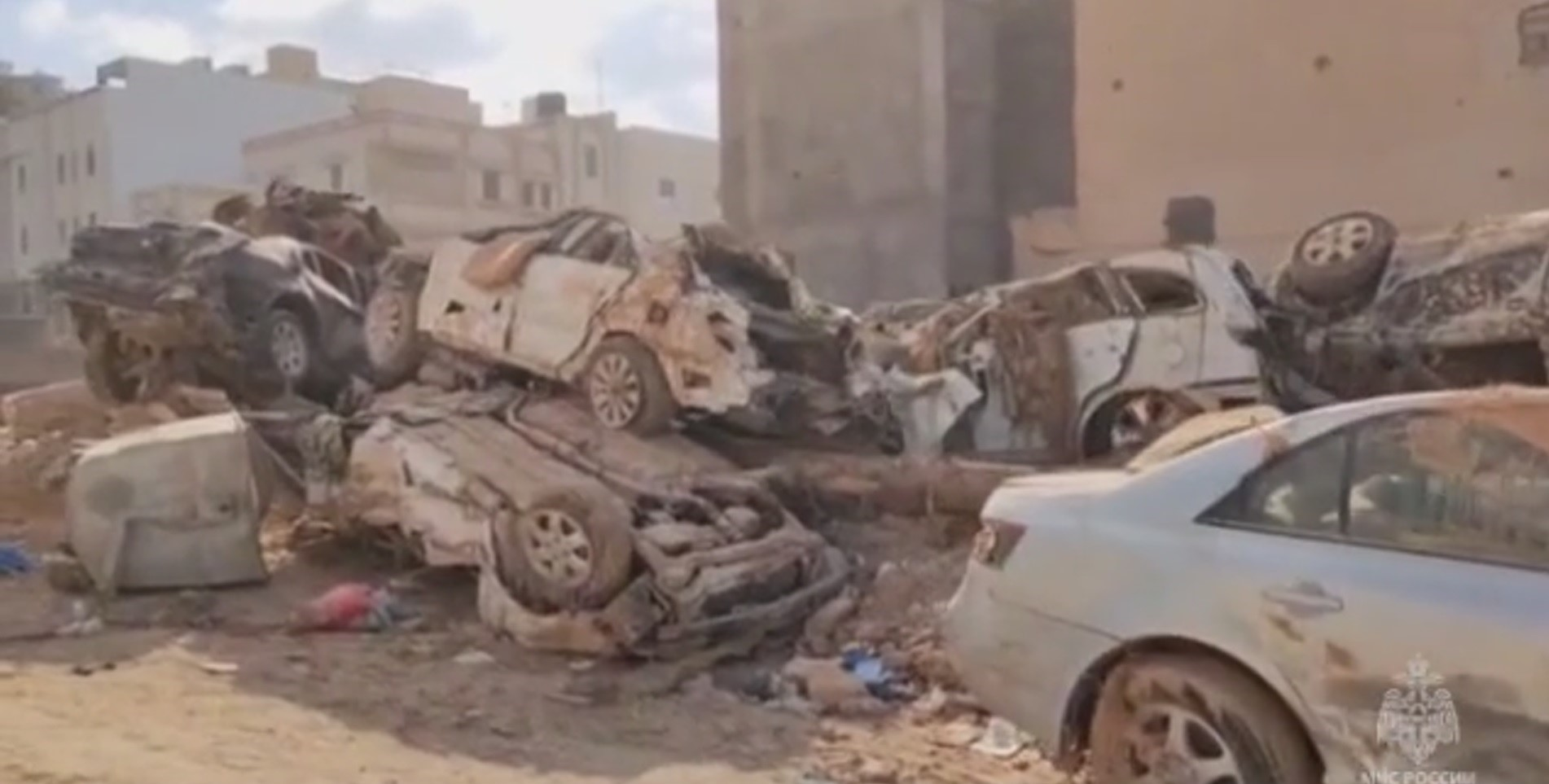
Devastation following flooding from Storm Daniel in September, 2023

Libya is highly vulnerable to the effects of climate change and underprepared to deal with them. Situated along the coast of the Mediterranean Sea and North Africa, Libya faces accelerated warming when compared with global average temperatures. Temperatures in Libya have already risen above the global average of 1.1 degrees Celsius and are estimated to reach approximately 4 degrees Celsius by the end of the century.

There have been notable impacts on both the natural environment and society due to climate change. The effects of climate change, such as desertification, sea level rise, flooding, and irregular weather patterns are already noticeable in Libya and are expected to increase. These pose significant threats to Libya's food and water security and economic development and sustainability.

Libya was late to sign the United Nations Framework Convention on Climate Change (UNFCCC) in 2016 and ratify the Paris Climate Agreement in 2021. However, as of 2024, Libya has not submitted its Nationally Determined Contributions (NDCs) and has made little progress toward the development of adaptation plans.

== Greenhouse gas emissions ==
In 2023 Libya emitted around 23.77 million tonnes of greenhouse gases, around 0.17% of the world's total emissions. However, the nation ranked as the 21st highest emitter per capita globally and the highest in Africa, at just over 13 tonnes per person.

As of 2021, Libya is the highest per capita carbon emitter in Africa with an estimated annual rate of 8.5 tons of CO_{2} per person. On the global scale, however, Libya represents a much smaller percentage of carbon emissions. In 2022, Libya emitted 44.682 Mt of CO_{2}, equating to only 0.1% of global CO_{2} emissions. In terms of methane, Libya is considered one of the highest global polluters in the context of its barrel-to-flare ratio.

The burning of fossil fuels is the biggest source of these emissions for Libya, specifically oil. The sectors of Libya's economy that produce the largest greenhouse gas emissions are the electricity sector, followed by the transportation sector. In 2021, Libya was the seventh-largest producer of crude oil out of the Organization of Petroleum Exporting Countries (OPEC). Further, 3% of the world's oil reserves and 39% of Africa's oil reserves are in Libya. The economy of Libya, by way of oil production, is currently dependent on activities that emit greenhouse gasses.

== Impacts on the natural environment ==
=== Temperature and weather changes ===
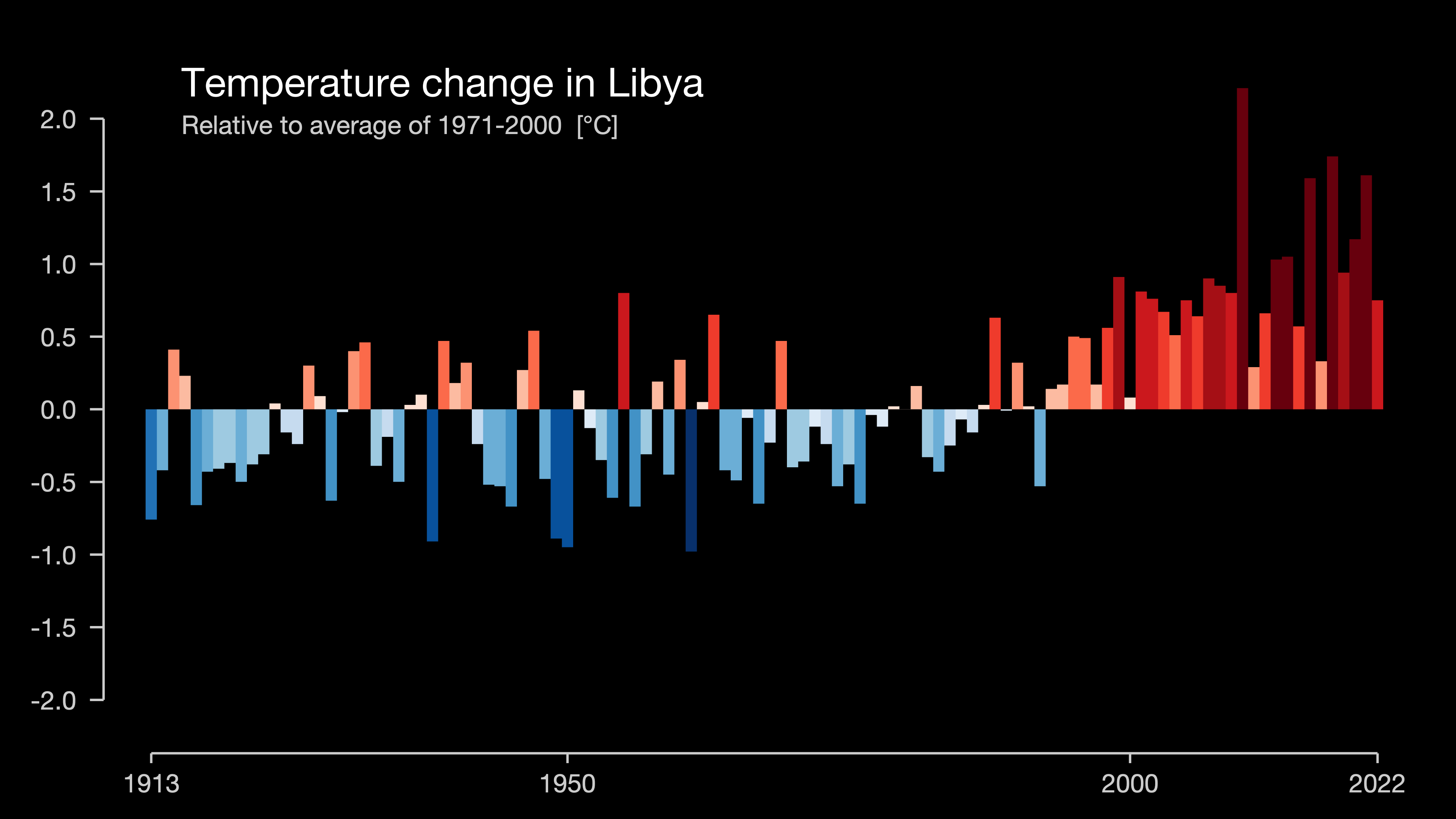
Temperature change in Libya, each bar represents the average temperature over that year.

The increase in regional temperatures in tandem with other anthropocentric factors of urbanization, migration, and resource exploitation is reducing the availability of arable land and contributing to a disproportionate increase in desert ecosystems over other vegetation and ecosystems. Arable land was already scarce and at its peak in 1996, comprising only 1.2 percent of the country's territory. Since then it has shrunk to about 1 percent of the territory.

=== Water resources ===
Great Man-Made River schema

Libya is incredibly water scarce and vulnerable to high water insecurity, largely due to its lack of rivers and other bodies of freshwater. Globally, Libya is the sixth water stressed nation. Libya receives about 56 millimeters of long-term average precipitation annually, which leads to total reliance on non-renewable aquifers and desalination. Indeed, eighty percent of the country's potable water supply is drawn from non-replenishable fossil aquifers through a network of pipes known as the Great Man-Made River (GMMR).

Libya has a high rate of water consumption, especially in agriculture. Its agriculture water consumption is 4th largest in the Middle East and North Africa (MENA) region. The agricultural sector receives 83.1% of all freshwater resources, largely for the purposes of livestock and irrigation. Alongside the limited availability of water and the frequency of droughts in Libya, these challenges make water scarcity a prevalent issue.

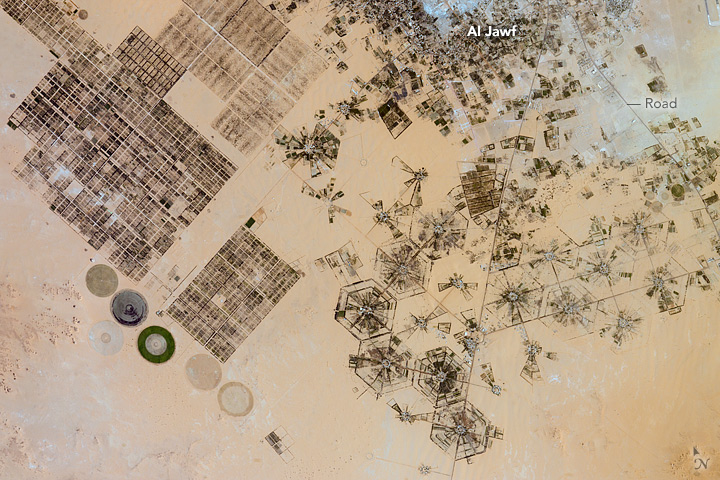
Satellite image of different irrigation methods in Libya

Libya is supplied by groundwater aquifers, including some that reside along its coastline on the Mediterranean Sea. However, deteriorating water quality puts additional stress on water scarcity challenges. Due to sea level rise and flooding events, freshwater sources in Libya experience saltwater intrusion. Furthermore, pollution from fertilizers and sewage mismanagement have negatively affected the quality of water in some aquifers.

The Great Man-Made River (GMMR) is one such aquifer example and provides Libya with 60% of its water resources. It is the largest underground irrigation project in the world. However, the project's construction allows it to tap into and exploit non-renewable aquifers, which cannot be recharged by precipitation events. Therefore, the long-term stability of this project as a water resource is variable since it depends upon a decreasing reserve.

== Impacts on people ==
=== Sea level rise ===
The population of Libya is most dense on its coast, with 90% of individuals living along the Mediterranean Sea. Hurricanes, in tandem with increased sea level elevation, have induced flooding, especially in port cities such as Derna. There are a multitude of effects from this, including infrastructural impacts (damage to buildings, bridges, and wastewater systems), erosion of the coastline, and saltwater intrusion (reducing the viability of fertile soil for agriculture).

=== Temperature and weather changes ===
Libya has been experiencing increasing temperatures, with extreme heat in the summer of 2022 hitting above 50 degrees Celsius. 90% of Libya's population lives in urban centers. City populations are expected to be greatly impacted by climate change as rising regions temperatures pair with the urban heat island effect, thus affecting the majority of Libya's urban population. Rural communities will also be impacted by increasing temperatures, the effects of which may be seen in the agricultural sector. Libya already has low agricultural yields and imports 75% of food required to support the population. Agricultural productivity is reducing due to changing weather patterns and increased drought. Agricultural yield in Libya is expected to decline 30% by 2060 with an approximate temperature rise of 1.5-2 degrees Celsius. This will affect the food security and the economic viability of agriculture in rural communities.

A map showing the impact of Storm Daniel, aftermath of Derna floods, September 2023

=== Health ===
In 2023, Storm Daniel caused severe flooding in multiple major cities in Libya. The flooding led to the deaths of 4,352 individuals, with over 8,000 people still unaccounted for according to the United Nations Office for the Coordination of Humanitarian Affairs (OCHA) office of the UN. In the aftermath of devastating floods in September 2023, officials on a UN support mission in the region reported water contamination and poor sanitation standards. The lack of clean water following the floods led to an outbreak of illness with 150 people suffering from diarrhea after the affected individuals drank the contaminated water.

Mental health impacts also result from climate change related events, known as eco-anxiety. A study investigating the influence of climate-change on mental health in Libyan Arab populations discovered that for individuals who have experienced the effects of a natural disaster there is the possibility for direct mental health repercussions such as depression and feelings of helplessness, increased anxiety, acute emotional distress and sleep disruption. Findings from the study also found that females and younger individuals displayed high levels of anxiety than males and older demographics.

=== Effects on migration ===
Both internal migration and interregional migration occur in Libya. Climate change acts as a threat multiplier for migrant populations, influencing both internal displacement and the dynamics of migration to and through the country. As of 2023, there is a significant presence of approximately 704,369 migrants from various nations. Most migrants entering Libya come from Sub-Saharan and North Africa. Drivers of migration to Libya include the search for economic opportunities, environmental degradation in their countries of origin, and conflict or violence.

Migrant populations within Libya are particularly vulnerable to climatic events and their aftermath, or climatic shocks. Those most affected include individuals fleeing conflict and war, who may find themselves facing additional challenges due to environmental instability. Many migrants also use Libya as a transit point to Europe, with a notable increase in the number of migrants attempting to cross to Italy and Malta in 2023.

The distribution of migrants within Libya is shaped by both economic and climatic factors. Arid desert climates deter populations from settling in southern Libya, prompting many to seek opportunities in urban and coastal areas, which exacerbates population concentration in cities and increases the threat of sea-level rise on migrant livelihood.

Internal migration and displacement are also prevalent due to slow-onset climate processes. Rising temperatures, drought, flooding, and water salinization have contributed to internal displacement, particularly when combined with mismanaged water resources. The degradation of infrastructure and reduced agricultural capabilities have led to increased urbanization and the displacement of rural populations.

=== Mitigation ===
Efforts to mitigate the effects of climate change in Libya have been limited. There is a lack of updated and well implemented climate legislation. The last law passed in Libya to address environmental degradation and vulnerability was in 2003. Government corruption and poor resource management, specifically over water and energy, has contributed to the lack of climate mitigation in Libya.

Though national efforts towards climate change mitigation are ineffective and insufficient, there are strides being made on community and international levels.

=== Adaptation ===
Climate change adaptation has been slow in Libya. Since the implementation of the Environment Improvement Law of 2003, there has been a weak enforcement of environmental policy. International efforts have been made to push Libya in the direction of implementing more adaptive strategies. In 2023, Libya implemented the Law on the Regulation of Radioactive and Nuclear Activities and their control. However, without the implementation of NDC's per the ratification of the Paris Agreement, Libya is still behind many nations in their adaptive climate policy.

== Society and culture ==
=== Activism ===
Prior to 2011 there were governmental restrictions on civic participation in politics and activism and existing NGOs were closely supervised to prevent such participation. In 2011, a new Libyan constitution and a change in government, allowed for activism and freedom of expression with more limits on government oversight. These social changes catalyzed the formation of over 6,000 civil society organizations addressing a wide range of humanitarian and environmental issues. However, in March 2023, under the administration of Prime Minister Abdul Hamid Dbeibeh, NGO's formed after 2011 began having their licenses stripped due to fear of impacts on an upcoming election. The social mobility created by NGOs threatens the conservative Libyan government and society. Delegitimizing NGOs in Libya threatens civil engagement and activism surrounding climate change, giving rise to local and international distress over the crackdown.

The effects of natural disasters have also driven some forms of recent protest. Following catastrophic flooding in Derna, Libya in September 2023, protestors took to the streets to call for accountability from the government for mismanaged infrastructure and climate mis-governance, which led to and exacerbated the flooding. Derna, a culturally rich city, sometimes referred to as “the city of poets,” also saw protest and activism through poetry written during and after the floods. The presence of social media has inspired social mobility surrounding climate activism and has given a platform for individuals to express ideas about political and social issues.

== International cooperation ==
Due to high vulnerability risk factors, there is significant collected data through international organizations. Cooperative international efforts have been made to include Libya in global climate discussions and solutions, however there has been limited progress and commitment made by the Libyan government to commit to international climate policy and protocol. The Libyan government has previously stated the importance of environmental conservation and climate change goals, however Libya remains the only signatory party of the Paris Agreement with no stated climate strategy.

International organizations and entities provide significant support towards climate change related efforts in Libya. For example, the UNDP works with the government and public organizations to offer support in areas such as natural resource preservation and energy transition with missions such as the “Support to Energy Transition and Climate Mitigation”. Additionally other international actors such as the German Corporation for International Cooperation (GIZ) have invested in projects to advance sustainable energy solutions and climate goals. One project currently ongoing with GIZ in Libya is called “Sustainable Energy and Climate Change Adaptation for Resilience” (SECCAR), which is supported by UN and German government funding.

A regional project concept note was submitted on ‘Cross border programme to enhance resilience of oases ecosystems and livelihoods in the North African region’ by Algeria, Egypt, Libya, Mauritania, Morocco, Tunisia - to Green Climate Fund (GCF) in November 2019. Traditional oases in North Africa represent unique forms of adaptation to extreme environmental conditions and provide multiple ecosystem services.
