= Morgan Schaller =

American Geochemist

Morgan F. Schaller
- Born: 1982 (age 43–44)
- Education: Rutgers University, M.Sc., & Ph.D., Binghamton University, B.S., B.A.
- Awards: F.G. Houtermans Award
- Scientific career
- Fields: Stable isotope geochemistry, Fluid inclusion geochemistry, Paleoclimatology, Geology
- Workplaces: Rensselaer Polytechnic Institute, Professor, 2014 - Present
- Thesis: Large igneous provinces and Earth's carbon cycle: Lessons from the late Triassic and rapidly emplaced Central Atlantic Magmatic Province (2012)
- Doctoral advisor: Dennis V. Kent
- Other academic advisors: Paul E. Olsen, James D. Wright, Ying Fan Reinfelder
- Website: faculty.rpi.edu/morgan-schaller

Morgan Schaller (born 1982) is an American geochemist and geologist specializing in stable isotope and fluid inclusion geochemistry, which he uses to reconstruct Earth's ancient atmospheric gas concentrations. He is currently the Edward P. Hamilton Associate Professor of Earth Science at Rensselaer Polytechnic Institute, in Troy, NY. Schaller was the 2018 recipient of the F.G. Houtermans Award from the European Association of Geochemistry, which recognizes the exceptional contributions to geochemistry by an early career scientist.

Schaller's scholarly works have been cited over 2500 times.

== Education ==
After receiving dual bachelor's degrees from Binghamton University in both Geology and Biology in 2005, he moved to Rutgers for an MS in hydrogeology, and a PhD in geochemistry (2012) with Dennis V. Kent. While at Rutgers, Schaller used sediments from the Newark Basin, a Triassic rift lake basin that formed as Pangea broke apart, to estimate the atmospheric CO_{2} concentration through the Late Triassic to earliest Jurassic.

Schaller completed postdoctoral research at Yale with Mark Pagani, Brown with Jessica Whiteside, and at the Rutgers Institute of Marine and Coastal Sciences with Yair Rosenthal and Paul Falkowski before joining the faculty at RPI. Schaller's current interests are broadly in the history of the Earth system and changes in climate over long timescales, with a particular focus on intervals of mass extinction or other global-scale perturbations.

== Research ==
Schaller uses light stable isotopes and fluid inclusions to trace the interaction and transfer of elements through the atmosphere, biosphere, and solid earth. He is notable in geochemistry and paleoclimatology as the first to empirically demonstrate the atmospheric CO_{2} increase due to the eruption of a Large Igneous Province. These proxy observations were made using the soil carbonate paleobarometer on sediments in superposition with the Late Late Triassic Central Atlantic Magmatic Province lavas in the Newark Basin. Schaller showed that atmospheric CO_{2} concentrations doubled after each eruptive pulse of flood basalt volcanism, and subsequently decreased over the next few hundred thousand years due to weathering of the lavas themselves.

Schaller is also credited with discovering impact ejecta at the Paleocene-Eocene boundary, suggesting that an extraterrestrial impact played a role in the climate event known as the Paleocene-Eocene Thermal Maximum (PETM). He and colleague Megan Fung were also the first to observe significant and contemporaneous accumulations of charcoal at the beginning of the PETM event from cores through the Paleocene-Eocene interval on the Atlantic Coastal Plain. The charcoal data indicate widespread, intense, and likely synchronous wildfires across the mid-Atlantic region during this period of rapid and intense global warming 56 million years ago.

== Awards ==
- F.G. Houtermans Award from the European Association of Geochemistry, 2018
