= Lisa Tauxe =

Geophysicist

- Education: BS, Yale University; MA & PhD Columbia University
- Awards: Benjamin Franklin Medal (2014)
- Scientific career
- Fields: Earth's geomagnetic field; paleomagnetic data analysis; paleointensity; archeomagnetism
- Workplaces: Scripps Institution of Oceanography, UC San Diego
- Doctoral advisor: Dennis V. Kent
- Website: http://magician.ucsd.edu/

Lisa Tauxe is a geophysicist, professor and former department chair at the Scripps Institution of Oceanography. Tauxe is a researcher and international authority on the behavior of the ancient geomagnetic field and applications of paleomagnetism to geological problems.

== Career ==
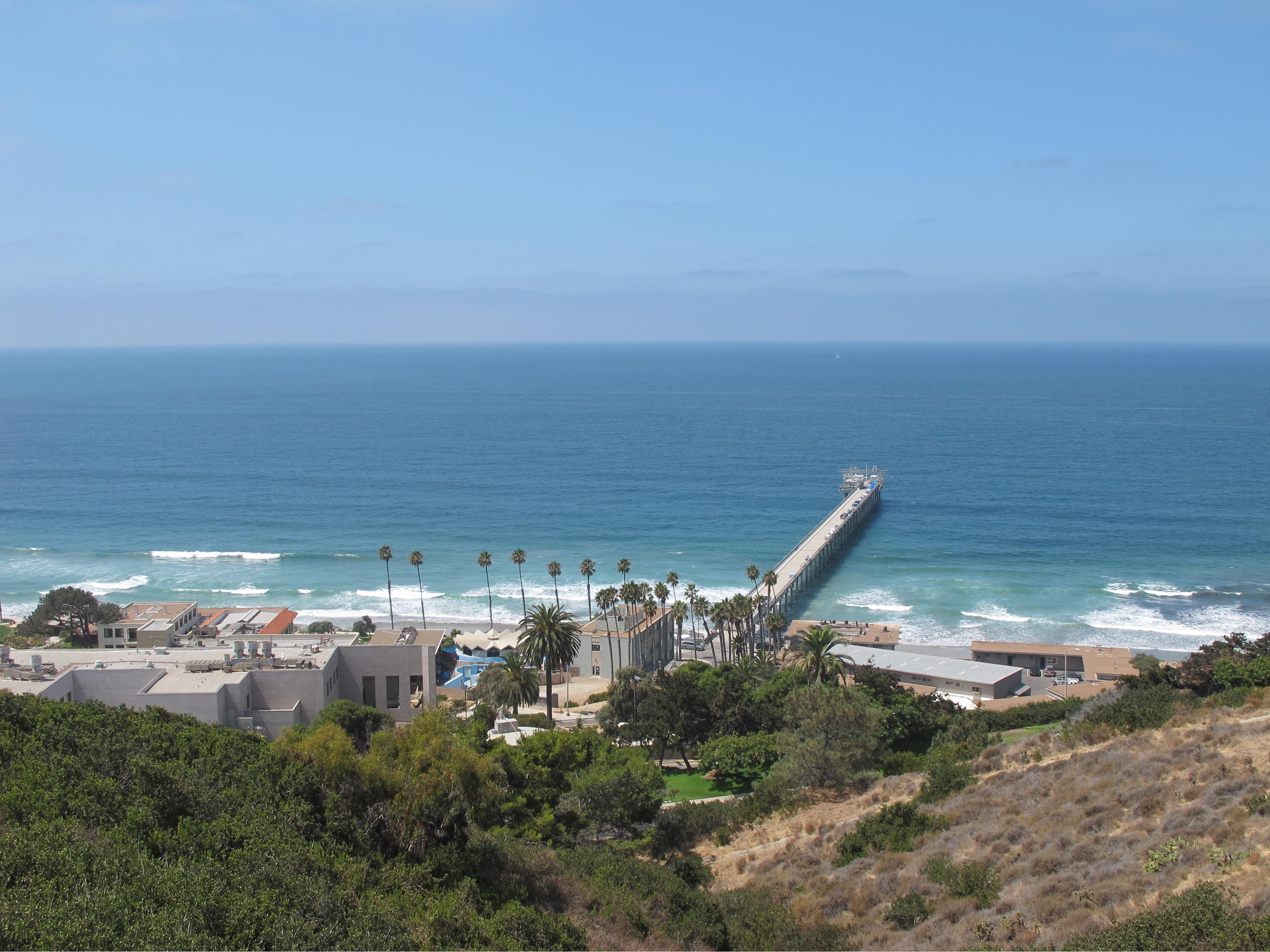
Scripps Institution of Oceanography

Tauxe's contributions include the study of remanent magnetism in geological and archaeological materials, as well as co-founding a collaborative data system for compiling and sharing geological magnetic data from around the globe, the Magnetics Information Consortium (MagIC). To facilitate paleomagnetic measurements, Tauxe uses a demagnetized space in San Diego. Tauxe is a leader in research that documents when the Earth's magnetic poles reversed. Because technology and electrical grids depend on the Earth's magnetic field to protect it from the Sun's magnetic storms, Prof. Tauxe's work has global significance. She pioneered paleointensity analysis of undersea basaltic glasses and copper slag residues found in archaeological sites, fundamentally changing the process of collecting magnetic field data and the volume of data available to study.

Prof. Tauxe graduated from Columbia University with a Ph.D. in 1983.

In 2014, Prof. Tauxe was awarded the prestigious Ben Franklin Medal for Earth and Environmental Science "[f]or the development of observational techniques and theoretical models providing an improved understanding of the behavior of, and variations in intensity of, the Earth's magnetic field through geologic time." As of 2014, Tauxe was the general secretary of the American Geophysical Union.

Prof. Tauxe has authored two textbooks, over 250 academic papers, including 44 in AGU journals.

=== Advisory positions and distinctions ===
- Science advisory board of the Beijing Paleomagnetism and Geochronology Laboratory (2006 to present)
- Research Advisory Committee of the Institute for Rock Magnetism (2005–2007; 2022-2025).
- Magnetics Information Consortium Database Team and Meta-data Committee (2005 to present).
- Fellow of American Geophysical Union
- Elected to the National Academy of Sciences, 2015
- Elected to the American Academy of Arts and Sciences, 2016
- Elected Foreign Member, Chinese Academy of Sciences, 2025

=== Select awards ===
- Petrus Peregrinus Medal, 2023
- Carl Friedrich von Siemens Research Award, Alexander von Humboldt Foundation (2020)
- Arthur L. Day Medal, 2014
- Benjamin Franklin Medal, 2014
- George P. Woollard Award, Geological Society of America, 2003
- The Antarctic Service Medal
- The John D. Fleming medal, American Geophysical Union

== Personal life ==
Tauxe has a brother, Dr. Robert Tauxe, who works at the Centers for Disease Control and Prevention.
