= Houtermans Award =

Annual geochemistry award

The Houtermans Award is given annually by the European Association of Geochemistry for outstanding contributions to geochemistry made by scientists under 35 years old or within 6 years of their PhD award. The award is named after Fritz Houtermans and consists of an engraved medal and an honorarium of 1000 Euros. The F.G. Houtermans award is the only category from Geochemica Society and European Association of Geochemistry awards with equal gender representation in the last decade.

== Award winners ==
Source: ERG

Year	Name
1990	Michel Condomines
1995	Marc Chaussidon
1997	Ken Farley
1998	Terry Plank
1999	Erik Hauri
2000	Gleb Prokorvsky
2003	Jess Atkins
2004	Albert Galy
2005	Mark E. Hodson
2006	James Badro
2007	Steve Parman
2008	Nicolas Dauphas
2009	Nathan Yee
2010	Karim Benzerara
2011	Maud Boyet
2012	Frédéric Moynier
2013	James Day
2014	Liping Qin
2015	Caroline Peacock
2016	Kate Hendry, University of Bristol, UK
2017	Julie Prytulak, Imperial College London, UK
2018	Morgan Schaller, Rensselaer Polytechnic Institute, USA
2019	Stefan Lalonde, CNRS / Institut Universitaire Européen de la Mer, France

== See also ==
- List of geology awards
