= Nubian Sandstone =

Variety of sedimentary rock in the eastern Sahara

The Nubian Sandstone is a variety of sedimentary rock deposited on the Precambrian basement in the eastern Sahara, north-east Africa and Arabian Peninsula. It consists of continental sandstone with thin beds of marine limestones, and marls. The Nubian Sandstone was deposited between the Lower Paleozoic and Upper Cretaceous, with marine beds dating from the Carboniferous to Lower Cretaceous.

== Formation ==
The Nubian Sandstone ranges in age from the Cambrian to Upper Cretaceous eras. Positioning of the paleoequator and paleolatitude at 20° S was derived from paleomagnetic data showing the Nubian was originally deposited in the paleoequatorial to subequatorial zone. These paleomagnetic results corroborated previous studies suggesting that north Africa did not shift in latitude from 210 to 110 million years ago and extended this period to 85 million years. Nubian Sandstone was deposited under a tropical to subtropical climate and formed under a variety of continental conditions, including eolian merging intermittently into shallow marine.

== Characteristics ==
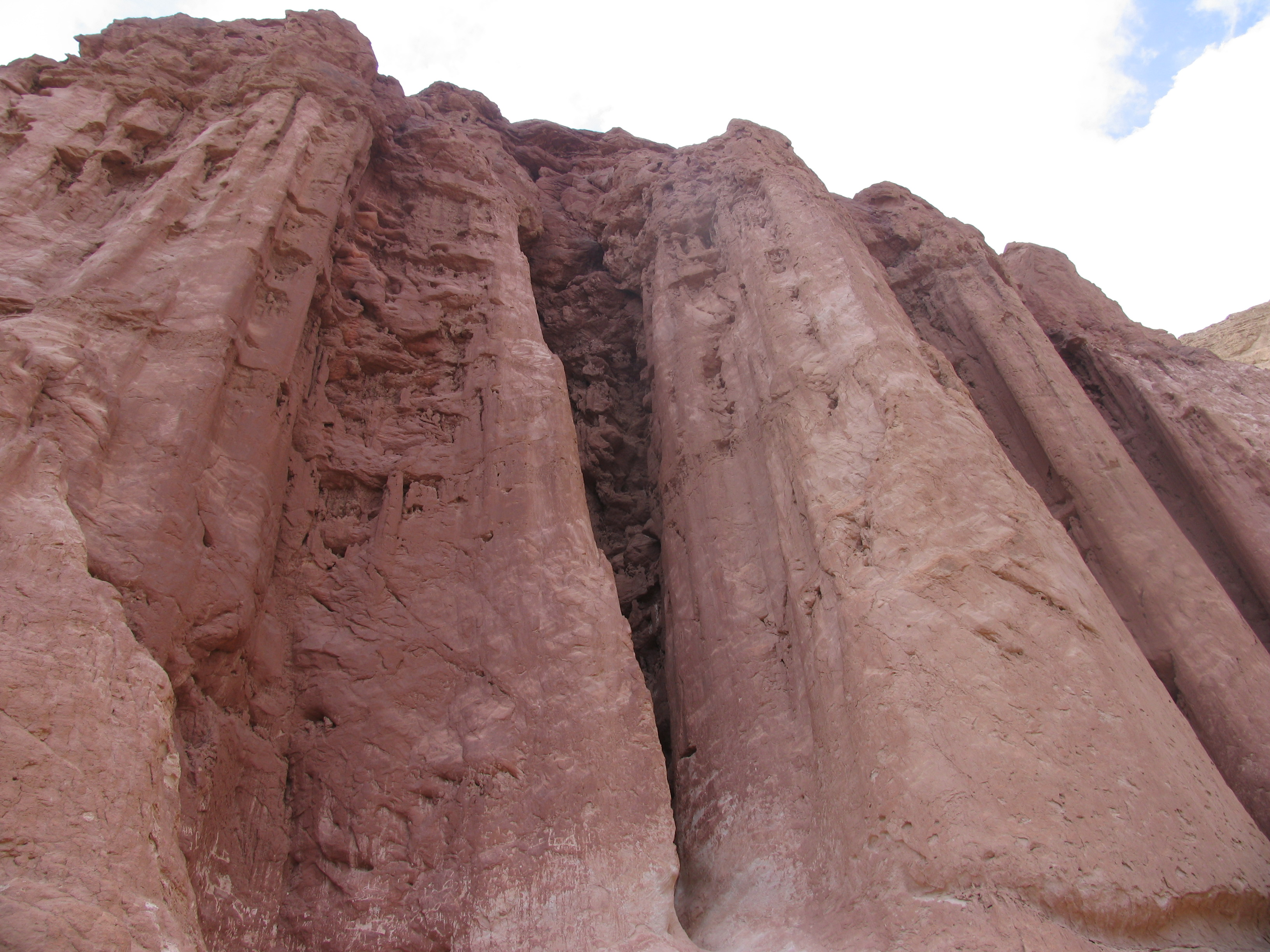
Nubian Sandstone formation of Amram Columns, Eilat Massif, Israel

The Nubian Sandstone complex has a thickness varying from under 500 m to over 3000 m, resting on the Precambrian basement. This is complicated by various structural faults and fold axes traversing the region in a north-eastern direction. Maximum development occurs in the Ain Dalla basin, a downthrown structural block south-west of the Bahariya oasis. Basement features present a dominant control on the complex's structural and sedimentological form. Despite many structural complications, the Nubian Sandstone likely constitutes a single hydrogeological system west of the Suez Gulf. To the east, on the Sinai Peninsula, a second system might exist with some connection to the primary western system in the north. The main western system, extending into Libya and Sudan, consists of a multi-layered artesian basin where massive groundwater reserves accumulated, principally during pluvials of the Quaternary. Locally, carbonate rocks overlying complex karst features and are recharged from the underlying major aquifer. Fluvial and structural interpretations from 2007 show the desert in western Egypt was induced by fluvial action, including recently mapped alluvial fans. In central areas, braided channels are spatially aligned to a north-east structural trend, suggesting preferential water flow paths. Alluvial fans and structurally enclosed channels with gentle slopes and optimal recharge conditions between 1 and 5%, indicating high groundwater potential. Synthetic Aperture Radar (SAR) interpretations correlated with anomalies from groundwater in 383 wells, suggest a connection between the spatial organization of fluvial and structural features with low-salinity groundwater, which exists adjacent to alluvial fans and the south-west reaches of structurally enclosed channels. Wells in the vicinity of structures contained low-salinity water.

== Derived soils ==
Nubian Sandstone exposures in sub-humid, semi-arid, and arid conditions produce soil that is red and sandy but very different in other aspects. Only in sub-humid zones do these soils contain a moderately developed profile, including a textural B horizon lacking soluble salts and carbonates. In semi-arid and arid zones, profile differentiation is either weak or does not exist. In arid zones soils are shallow and contain carbonates, and soluble salts, including gypsum. The sole clay mineral common to all Nubian sandstone parent materials is kaolinite, which is the major clay mineral in sub-humid zone soil. In semi-arid soils smectite is a second major clay component. In arid zones small amounts of smectite and palygorskite accompany kaolinite. It is likely that smectite and palygorskite are products of pedogenic neoformation. Aeolian material was probably introduced into the silt and fine sand fractions from semi-arid and arid soils. It is also possible that some contamination of clay fractions occurred.

=== Nubian Sandstone in Arabia ===
When in contact with Upper Cretaceous limestone, Nubian Sandstone underlies the latter conformably. In Lebanon, Anti-Lebanon and Hermon it is underlain by Jurassic limestone. Its upper strata is likely from the Lower or Middle Cretaceous age. However, Jurassic limestone is absent in southern areas. In Western Sinai, Nubian Sandstone rests on Carboniferous limestone, and by the Dead Sea on Cambrian limestone: at Petra and other locations it rests unconformably on crystalline rocks. While age calculation for the Nubian Sandstone is relatively simple in Lebanon, Anti-Lebanon and Hermon, it is much more complicated in Western Sinai and the Dead Sea area. Since sandstone is assumed to form more rapidly than other rocks it is difficult to conceive that the 2,000 feet of sandstone in the southeastern Dead Sea was in the formative process from the Cambrian to the Cretaceous.

== Appearance ==
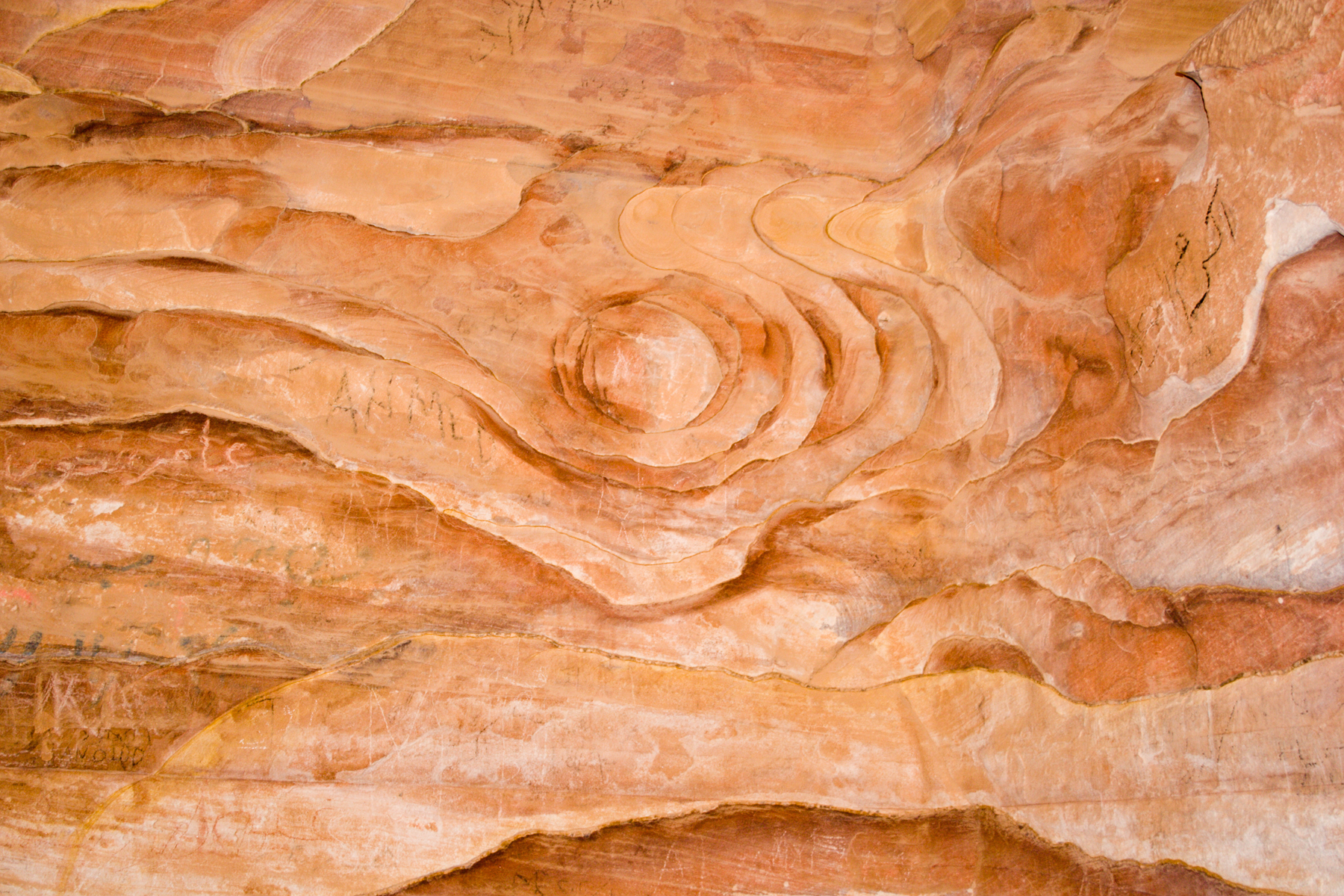
Liesegang rings made of iron oxide in sandstone from a chamber in Petra, Jordan

Nubian Sandstone is most commonly brown or reddish, but in places it shows a much wider variety of color. The ancient temples and tombs in Petra were carved from this rock. In certain places it is extremely friable, and in others compact and hard. Sand in the Arabian deserts was primarily derived from it, carried by prevailing western winds. Where it is covered by a sheet of eruptive rock (charrah), it is protected from erosion. Nubian Sandstone frequently includes strata of clay and shale and thin seams of coal or lignite. This indicates that it was deposited in seas that were relatively shallow at the time.

== Etymology ==
The term Nubian Sandstone was first introduced to the Egyptian stratigraphy by Joseph Rüssegger in 1837, who used the term "Sandstein von Nubien" to designate nonfossiliferous sandstone sections of Paleozoic or Mesozoic age. Rüssegger followed and studied this series of sandstone formations from the Sudan, Egypt, Libya, and Arabia Petraea (northwestern Arabia).

== See also ==
- Nubian Aquifer System
- Arabian-Nubian Shield
