= Nubian Sandstone Aquifer System =

Fossil water aquifer system in northeastern Africa

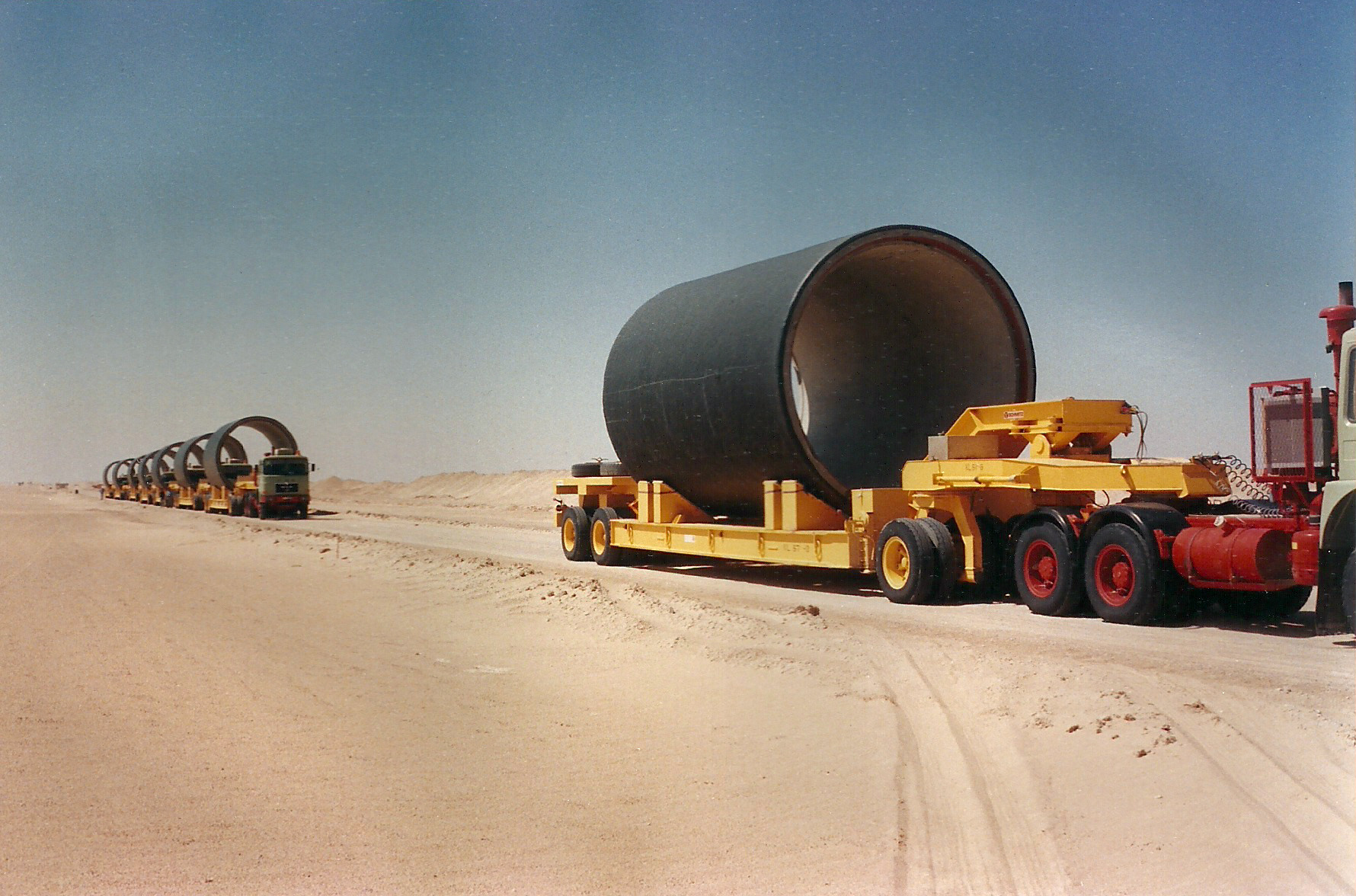
The transport of pipe segments for the Great Man-Made River (GMMR) in the Sahara desert, Libya, during the 1980s. A network of pipes that supplies water from the Nubian Sandstone Aquifer System, a fossil aquifer in the Sahara desert of Libya, the GMMR is the world's largest irrigation project.

The Nubian Sandstone Aquifer System (NSAS) is the world's largest known fossil water aquifer system. It is located underground in the eastern end of the Sahara desert and spans the political boundaries of four countries in northeastern Africa.

The NSAS covers over two million km^{2}, including northwestern Sudan, northeastern Chad, southeastern Libya, and most of Egypt. Containing an estimated 150,000 km^{3} of groundwater, the NSAS is potentially an enormous water resource for these countries. The Great Man-Made River (GMMR) project in Libya extracts about 2.4 km^{3} of fresh water from it for consumption and agriculture per year.

== Characteristics ==
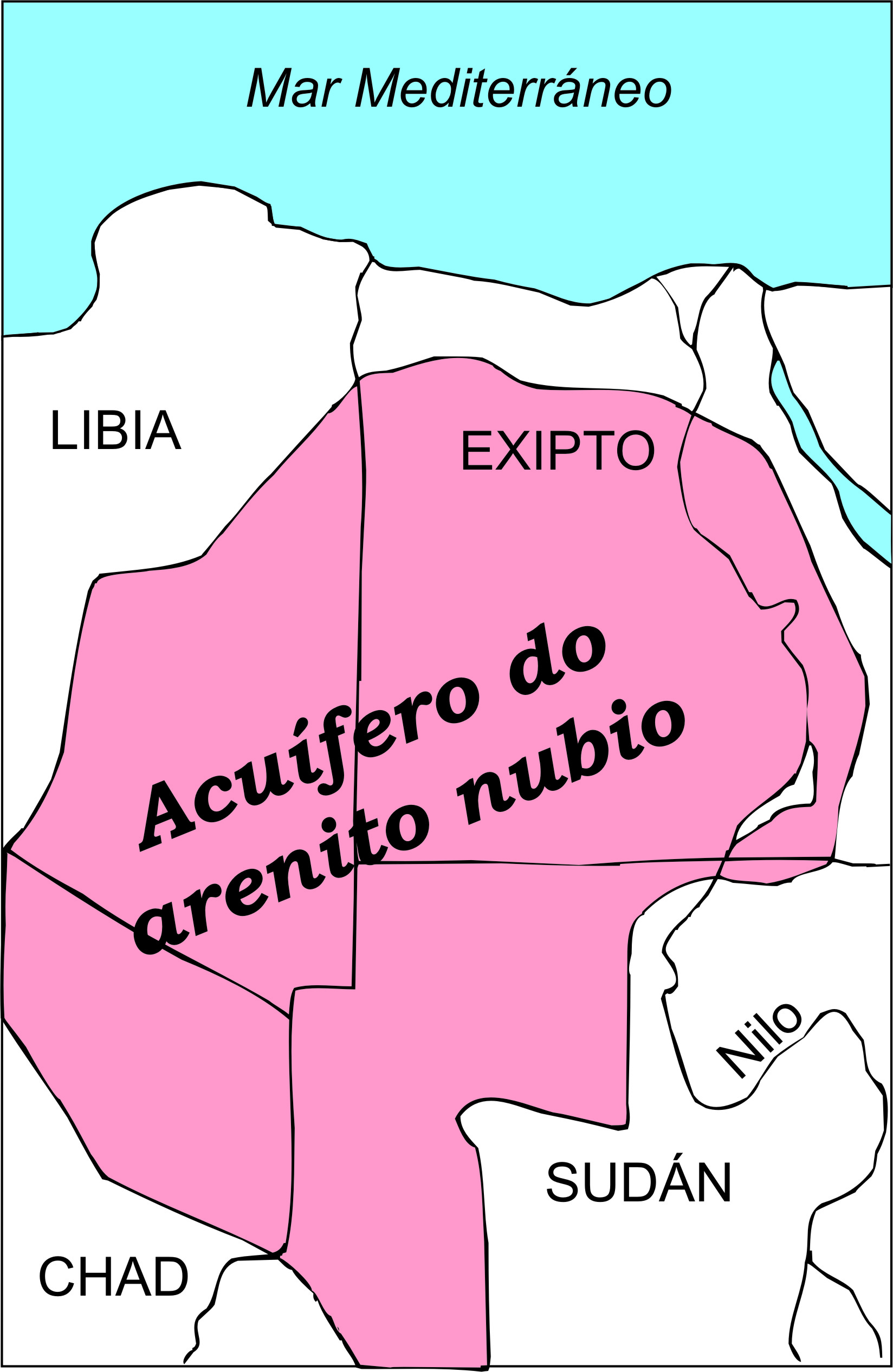
Nubian Sandstone Aquifer System

Since 2001, the Nubian Sandstone aquifer situated between the Toshka and Abu Simbel areas of Egypt has undergone intensive drilling and development as part of a land reclamation project. Drilling information was used to conduct a variety of studies regarding the hydrogeological setting of the area's aquifer.

Results indicated that lithological characteristics and tectonic settings have a substantial effect on groundwater flow patterns and the area's overall aquifer potentiality, which is considered relatively low when compared to neighboring areas in eastern Oweinat or Dakhla.

=== Geology ===
The aquifer is largely composed of hard ferruginous sandstone with great shale and clay intercalation, between 140 and 230 meters thick. The water salinity ranges from fresh (240 ppm) to slightly brackish (1300 ppm). Sodium cation is most common ion, predominating over calcium and magnesium – and chloride is predominant over sulfate and bicarbonate. The groundwater is of meteoric origin (that is, it originated as precipitation like most groundwater).

High concentrations of sodium, chloride, and sulfates reflect the leaching and dissolution processes of gypsiferous shales and clay, in addition to a lengthy water residence. Two recharge locations tied to specific epochs have been identified by Reika Yokochi et al.: one 38,000 years ago originating from the Mediterranean, and the second dated at around 361,000 years ago from the tropical Atlantic.

== International development projects ==
Since 2006, the International Atomic Energy Agency has been working in cooperation with the four NSAS countries to help increase understanding of the aquifer's complexities through the IAEA-UNDP-GEF Nubian Project. Project partners include the United Nations Development Programme (UNDP)/Global Environment Facility (GEF), IAEA, United Nations Educational, Scientific and Cultural Organization (UNESCO) and government representatives from the NSAS countries. The project's long-term goal is establishing rational and equitable management of the NSAS as a productive way of advancing socio-economic development in the region and protecting biodiversity and land resources.

== See also ==
- Lake Ptolemy
- African humid period

== Bibliography ==
- Essay and Maps: Groundwater Resources of the Nubian Aquifer System
- Dahab, K.A., El Sayed, E.A. Study of Hydrogeological Conditions of the Nubian Sandstone Aguifer in the Area Between Abu Simbel & Toschka, Western Desert, Egypt. American Geophysical Union, Spring 2001
