= Reika Yokochi =

Japanese geochemist

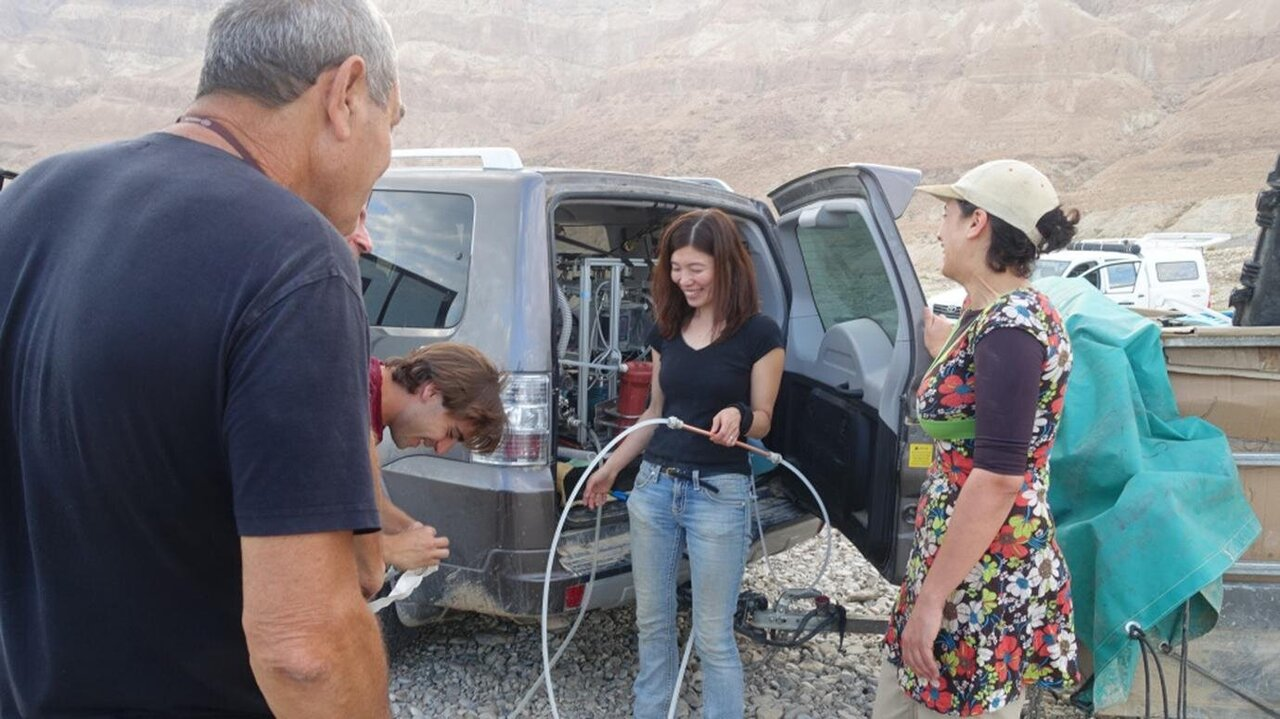
Reika Yokochi (in the center) and fellow scientists extracting gases from a water production well in the Negev Desert.

Reika Yokochi (横地玲果, born November 9, 1975 in Saga, Kyushu Prefecture, Japan; died on February 17, 2024 in Chicago, USA) was a Japanese geochemist who worked on the origin and geological behavior of volatile elements. She held the position of Research Professor in the Department of the Geophysical Sciences at the University of Chicago. Yokochi led a laboratory specializing in the purification and analysis of noble gases for dating and tracing water circulation within Earth's crust.

== Education and early career ==
Yokochi completed her doctoral studies in earth sciences at National Polytechnic Institute of Lorraine (French: L'Institut National Polytechnique de Lorraine) in 2005, supervised by Bernard Marty. Her PhD thesis focused on understanding the origin of volatile elements in Earth. She identified noble gases of solar origin in Earth's deep mantle. She also worked out the contribution of ^{244}Pu-decay (t_{1/2}=81 Myr) to fissiogenic ^{136}Xe* in the deep Earth, suggesting a protracted loss of volatiles from Earth's mantle. Between 2005 and 2008, she was a postdoctoral researcher with Neil C. Sturchio at the University of Illinois Chicago, after which she joined the University of Chicago as researcher in 2008.

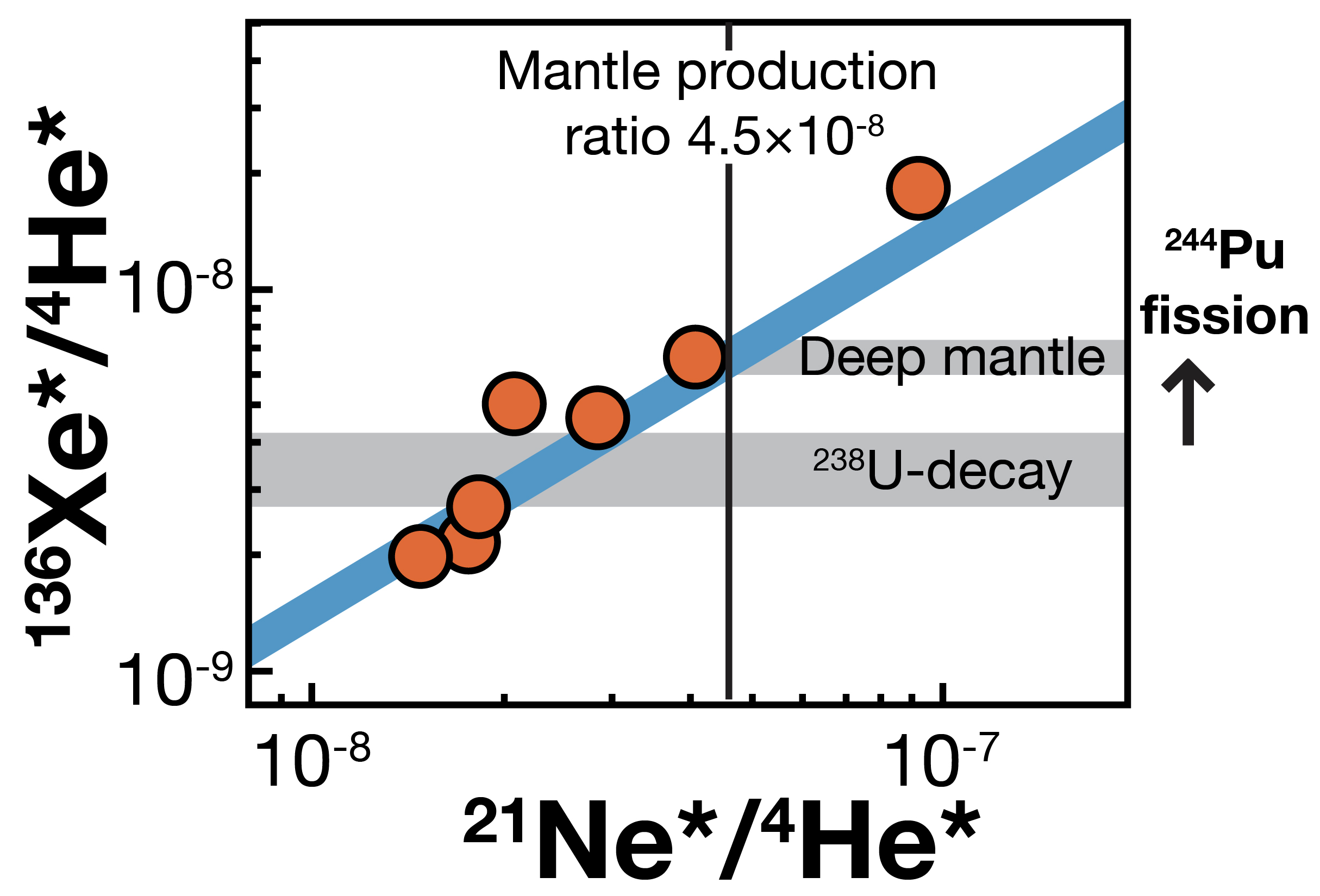
Variations in ^{136}Xe*/^{4}He* and ^{21}Ne*/^{4}He* in deep mantle samples from the Kola Peninsula reflect magmatic processes. By interpolating this correlation to the known ^{21}Ne*/^{4}He* production ratio of the mantle, Yokochi and Marty estimated the deep mantle ^{136}Xe*/^{4}He*, indicating that 33-60% of ^{136}Xe* comes from decay of ^{244}Pu (t_{1/2}=81 Myr) while the rest comes from decay of ^{238}U (t_{1/2}=4.5 Gyr).

== Research activities ==
Yokochi's research focuses on noble gas geochemistry. She uses noble gases radionuclides, notably Krypton-81 (^{81}Kr; t_{1/2}=230,000 yr), to study the age and circulation of groundwater in major aquifers worldwide, including the Nubian Sandstone Aquifer, Floridan Aquifer, and the geothermal waters of Yellowstone. Krypton-81 is produced by cosmic rays in the atmosphere and then dissolves into rainwater, eventually seeping into groundwater. The overall abundance of krypton in the atmosphere is only about 1.10 parts per million by volume (ppmv), and within this, the fraction of ^{81}Kr is extremely small, about 5 × 10^{−13}. Yokochi crafted a device capable of efficiently extracting krypton from vast quantities of groundwater, thus facilitating the accurate quantification of ^{81}Kr using Atom Trap Trace Analysis (ATTA).

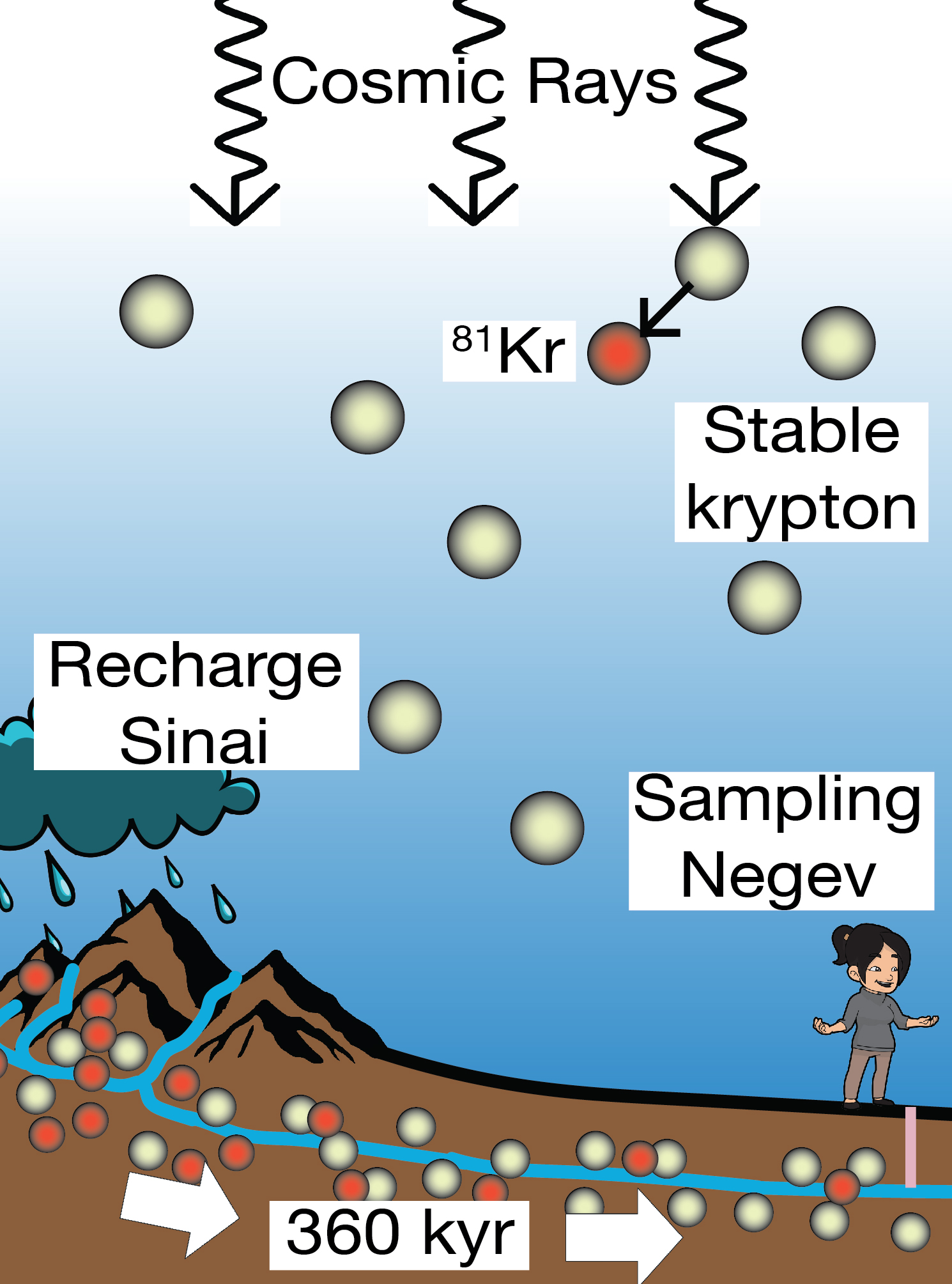
^{81}Kr forms in the atmosphere from cosmic ray interactions. In the Sinai, rainwater dissolves this isotope and stable krypton, infusing it into groundwater at recharge sites. As groundwater flows from these sites, ^{81}Kr decays. Analyzing the ^{81}Kr/krypton ratio in groundwater from the Negev indicates a recharge time of 360 kyr.

In a study of the Nubian Sandstone Aquifer in Israel's Negev Desert, Yokochi and colleagues utilized radiokrypton (^{81}Kr) to date groundwater, discovering two major water recharge events. The first, about 38,000 years ago, originated from the Mediterranean, and the second, around 361,000 years ago, from the tropical Atlantic. These events, coinciding with periods of low orbital eccentricity, reveal the sensitivity of moisture transport to orbital forcing. The study highlights groundwater's potential as a record of ancient precipitation and long-term subsurface water storage.

Application of ^{81}Kr to the Floridan Aquifer revealed freshwater recharge from the Last Glacial Period. Additionally, it detected fossil seawater predating the Last Glacial Maximum, indicating slow seawater movement and a limited but significant exchange of solutes with the ocean, contributing to the aquifer's dolomitization.

Yokochi also conducted experiments aimed at understanding how volatile elements are trapped in ices under conditions relevant to the formation of comets and icy moons. The results of those experiments showed that ice surfaces have heterogeneous adsorption energies, influenced by initial ice-deposition temperatures and thermal annealing. Adsorption sites with higher energy play a significant role at low pressures and higher temperatures, conditions relevant to the protosolar nebula. The experiments also showed that gas trapping occurs primarily through the burial of gas adsorbed on newly formed ice surfaces. Yokochi's experiments indicate that the formation temperature of comet 67P/Churyumov-Gerasimenko, as suggested by the observed Ar/H_{2}O ratio, was around 40 K.

Yokochi contributed to the analysis of gases in samples returned from the Ryugu asteroid by JAXA's Hayabusa2 mission.

=== Awards and recognition ===
Yokochi received the Young Scientist Award from the Geochemistry Research Association of Japan in 2012; the same year, she was also named a NASA Planetary Science Early Career Fellow.

== Personal life ==
Reika Yokochi was married to Nicolas Dauphas, a fellow planetary scientist; the couple has two children. She died on February 17, 2024 from EGFR-driven lung cancer, a disease that disproportionately affects nonsmoking women of East asian ancestry. Air pollution by particles less than 2.5 microns in diameter seems to be a factor contributing to the onset of EGFR-driven lung cancer.
