= Nicolas Dauphas =

French-American planetary scientist

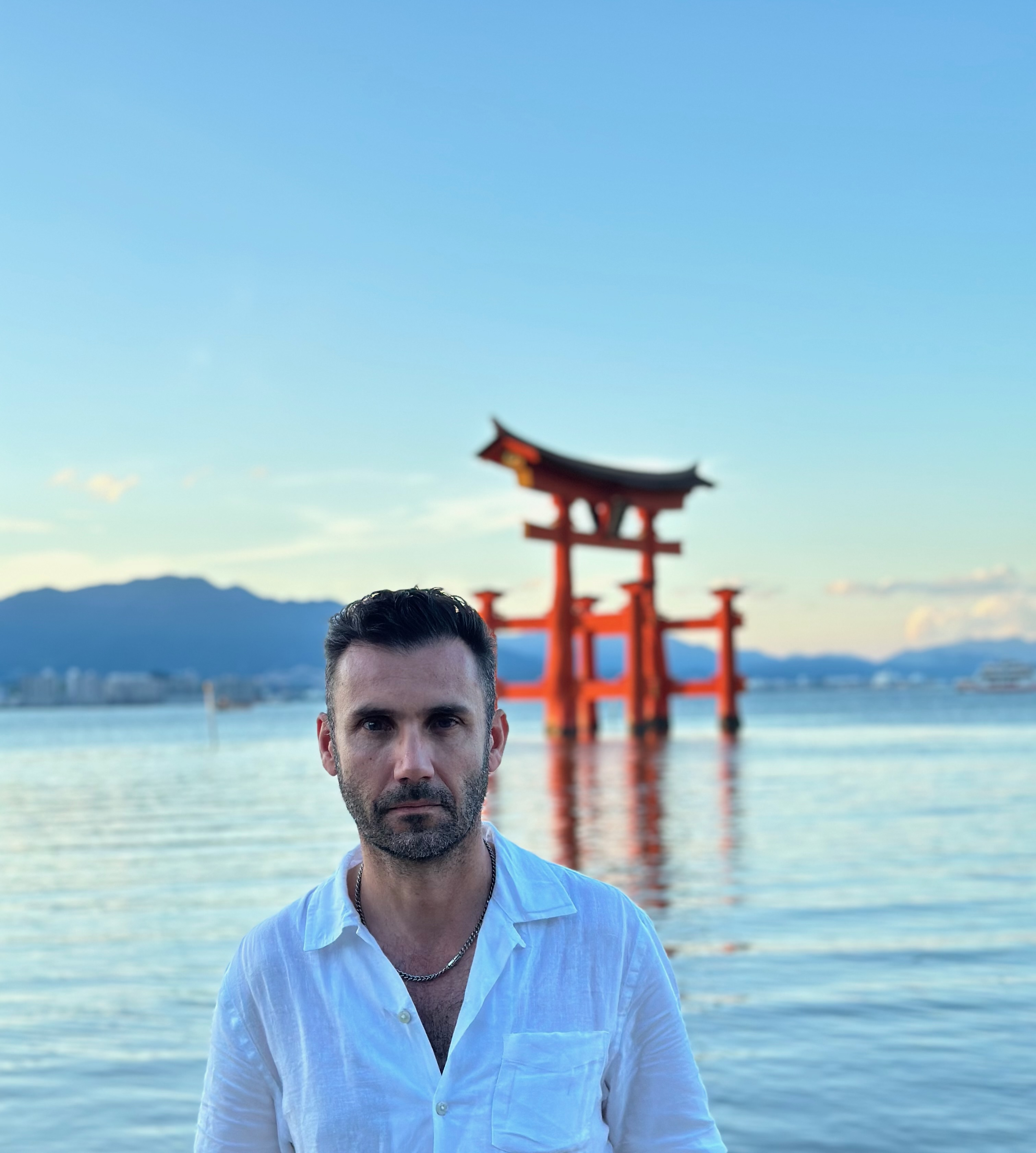
Cosmochemist Nicolas Dauphas, 2024.

Nicolas Dauphas (born December 10, 1975) is a French-American planetary scientist and isotope geochemist. He is a Chair Professor of geochemistry and cosmochemistry in the Department of Earth and Planetary Sciences at the University of Hong Kong. Within cosmochemistry, his research focus is on isotope geochemistry. He studies the origin and evolution of planets and other objects in the Solar System by analyzing the natural distributions of elements and their isotopes using mass spectrometers.

== Career ==
Born in Nantes in Brittany, France, Dauphas received a B.Sc. degree from École Nationale Supérieure de Géologie in 1998. The same year, he obtained an M.Sc. from Centre de Recherches Pétrographiques et Géochimiques, at the National Polytechnic Institute of Lorraine (French: L'Institut National Polytechnique de Lorraine; INPL). In 2002, also from INPL, he was awarded a Ph.D. in geochemistry and cosmochemistry, working with Bernard Marty and Laurie Reisberg. He then completed his postdoctoral research at the Enrico Fermi Institute of the University of Chicago and the Field Museum of Natural History from 2002 to 2004, before joining the faculty at the University of Chicago in 2004, where he stayed until 2025.

In August 2025, he joined the Department of Earth and Planetary Sciences at the University of Hong Kong as Chair Professor to lead a new initiative focused on advancing planetary science and the study of terrestrial and extraterrestrial materials.

=== Recognition and awards ===
In 2005, Dauphas was awarded Nier Prize of the Meteoritical Society which recognizes outstanding research in meteoritics and closely allied fields by young scientists. In 2007, he was awarded the David and Lucile Packard Foundation Fellowship, given to the most promising early-career scientists and engineers, across the US. He won the 2008 Houtermans Award, given by the European Association of Geochemistry for outstanding contributions to geochemistry. He was awarded the James B. Macelwane Medal of the American Geophysical Union (AGU) for "significant contributions to the geophysical sciences", and was selected as an AGU Fellow in 2011. In 2014, he became a Fellow of the Meteoritical Society. He was one of the finalists in 2017 for the Blavatnik National Awards. In 2016, Dauphas received a named professorship from the University of Chicago as the Louis Block professor, Physical Sciences Division. In 2019, Dauphas was elected Geochemical Fellow of the Geochemical Society and the European Association of Geochemistry in recognition of his career contribution to the field of geochemistry.

On April 30, 2024, it was announced that Nicolas Dauphas had been elected to the National Academy of Sciences.

== Research activities ==
By analyzing the isotopic compositions of stable and radiogenic nuclides in meteorites, Dauphas investigates the timing and processes that lead to the formation of Solar System bodies and the establishment of habitable conditions on Earth and Mars. He used iron isotopes to study how the iron biogeochemical cycle of the Earth changed through time. He established that Mars was formed rapidly, within the first 2~4 million years of the birth of the Solar System, which explains the much smaller size of Mars compared to Earth and Venus. He first identified the mineralogical carrier of the ^{54}Cr isotopic anomalies in meteorites as Cr-rich nano-sized spinels from supernovae. He constrained the nature of Earth's accreting materials through time, using a novel approach that relies on the different affinities of elements with Earth's core, and showed that the materials formed Earth are from an isotopically homogeneous reservoir.

Dauphas was part of the preliminary examination team for JAXA's Hayabusa2 mission, which returned a fragment of Ryugu carbonaceous asteroid to Earth for scientific research. He was selected as a member of the Mars Sample Return Campaign Science Group in 2022.

== Personal life ==
Nicolas Dauphas married a fellow planetary scientist, Reika Yokochi. The couple had two children. In February 2024, Dauphas posted to his Twitter (X) account that Yokochi had died from EGFR-positive lung cancer.

Dauphas states that he is of "French-American citizenship".
