= Dennis Kent =

American geologist and geophysicist

Dennis V. Kent
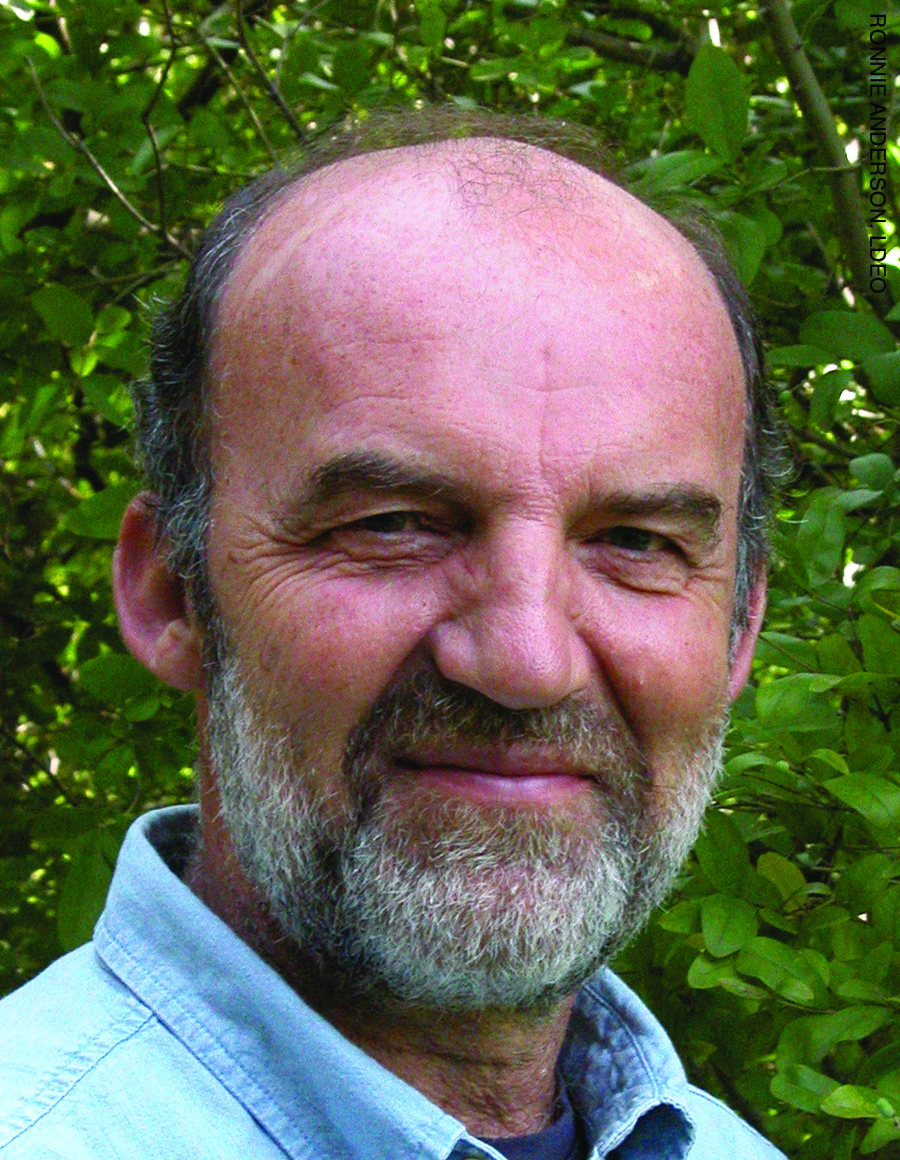
- Education: Ph.D. Columbia University, NY B.S. City College of New York, NY Stuyvesant High School
- Scientific career
- Fields: Paleomagnetism, Geomagnetism
- Workplaces: Rutgers University, Lamont–Doherty Earth Observatory
- Doctoral advisor: Neil D. Opdyke
- Notable students: Lisa Tauxe, Morgan Schaller

Dennis V. Kent is an American geologist and geophysicist who is a Doherty Senior Scholar at Lamont–Doherty Earth Observatory of Columbia University and a Board of Governors Professor Emeritus at Rutgers University. His research focuses on paleomagnetism, geomagnetism, rock magnetism, and their application to geologic problems, including geologic time scales, paleogeography, ancient climate, polar wander, and the long-term carbon cycle.

== Early life and education ==
Kent was born in Prague, Czech Republic. He came to the United States in 1953. He graduated from Stuyvesant High School in Manhattan in 1964. He received a Bachelor of Science degree in geology from the City College of New York in 1968 and a Doctor of Philosophy degree in marine geology and geophysics from Columbia University in 1974, where he studied magnetism of deep-sea sediments. He wed Carolyn Cook in 1971 and they have a daughter and a grandson.

== Career ==
Kent joined the Lamont–Doherty Earth Observatory as a research associate in 1974. He became an adjunct senior research scientist in 1998 and was later named a Doherty Senior Scholar.

He joined the adjunct faculty in the Department of Earth and Environmental Sciences at Columbia University in 1981, becoming adjunct professor in 1987, a position he held until 1998.In 1998, he joined the faculty at Rutgers University as a Distinguished Professor in the Department of Earth and Planetary Sciences, was named Board of Governors Professor of Geological Sciences in 2007 and became Board of Governors Professor Emeritus in 2020.

== Research ==
Kent's research focuses on paleomagnetism, geomagnetism, and rock magnetism, applying these tools to problems in chronostratigraphy, paleogeography, and paleoclimatology. He has authored or co-authored more than 330 peer-reviewed publications, which have garnered over 50,000 citations and an h-index of 104 according to Google Scholar.

In 1992, he and Steven C. Cande published a geomagnetic polarity time scale for the Late Cretaceous and Cenozoic based on marine magnetic profiles. Cande and Kent revised the calibration of the time scale in 1995 using new radioisotopic dates and magnetic anomaly spacings.

Kent, Paul E. Olsen and William K. Witte also published a detailed geomagnetic polarity sequence for the Late Triassic and earliest Jurassic based on drill cores from the Newark rift basin in eastern North America.

In a 2020 paper with Giovanni Muttoni, he examined the possible relationship between changes in the configuration of Pangea, silicate weathering and the Late Paleozoic Ice Age.

In 2010, Kent and Edward Irving published a study of the Triassic and Jurassic apparent polar wander path for North America. The study examined the effects of inclination error in sedimentary rocks and discussed implications for tectonic reconstructions of the North American Cordillera.

In 2021, Kent and Lars B. Clemmensen studied the northward dispersal of sauropodomorph dinosaurs from Gondwana to Greenland during the Late Triassic. They suggested that a decline in atmospheric carbon dioxide levels around 215–212 million years ago may have reduced climatic barriers to this dispersal.

Kent has also studied the timing of volcanism associated with the Central Atlantic Magmatic Province and its relationship to the end-Triassic mass extinction.

== Awards and honors ==
- 1985 Fellow, Geological Society of America
- 1991 Fellow, American Geophysical Union
- 1993 Fellow, American Association for the Advancement of Science
- 2003 Arthur L. Day Medal, Geological Society of America
- 2004 Member of the U.S. National Academy of Sciences
- 2006 Petrus Peregrinus Medal, European Geosciences Union
- 2009 William Gilbert Award, American Geophysical Union
- 2012 Fellow of the American Academy of Arts and Sciences
- 2022 John Adam Fleming Medal, American Geophysical Union

== Selected publications ==
- Kent, D. V. (1982), Apparent correlation of palaeomagnetic intensity and climatic records in deep-sea sediments, Nature 299, 538–539, doi:10.1038/299538a0
- Cande, S. C., and Kent, D. V. (1992), A new geomagnetic polarity time scale for the Late Cretaceous and Cenozoic, J. Geophys. Res., 97( B10), 13917– 13951, doi:10.1029/92JB01202
- Berggren, W.A., Kent, D.V., Swisher, C.C. and Aubry, M.P. (1995), A revised Cenozoic geochronology and chronostratigraphy, SEPM Special Publication 54: 129–212.
- Kent, D.V. and Muttoni, G. (2008). Equatorial convergence of India and early Cenozoic climate trends. Proceedings of the National Academy of Sciences, 105: 16065–16070.
- Kent, D.V., Olsen, P.E. and Muttoni, G. (2017), Astrochronostratigraphic polarity time scale (APTS) for the Late Triassic and Early Jurassic from continental sediments and correlation with standard marine stages. Earth-Science Reviews, 166: 153–180.
- Kent, D.V., Olsen, P.E., Rasmussen, C., Lepre, C., Mundil, R., Irmis, R.B., Gehrels, G.E., Giesler, D., Geissman, J.W. and Parker, W.G. (2018), Empirical evidence for stability of the 405-kiloyear Jupiter-Venus eccentricity cycle over hundreds of millions of years. Proceedings of the National Academy of Sciences, 115(24): 6153–6158.
- Kent, D.V. and Muttoni, G. (2020), Pangea B and the Late Paleozoic Ice Age. Palaeogeography, Palaeoclimatology, Palaeoecology, 553: 1-20.
- Kent, D.V. and Clemmensen, L.B. (2021), Northward dispersal of dinosaurs from Gondwana to Greenland at the mid-Norian (215–212 Ma, Late Triassic) dip in atmospheric pCO2. Proceedings of the National Academy of Sciences, 118(8): e2020778118.
- Channell, J.E.T., Muttoni, G. and Kent, D.V. (2022), Adria in Mediterranean paleogeography, the origin of the Ionian Sea, and Permo-Triassic configurations of Pangea. Earth-Science Reviews, 230: 104045.
- Kent, D.V. and Muttoni, G. (2022), Latitudinal land–sea distributions and global surface albedo since the Cretaceous. Palaeogeography, Palaeoclimatology, Palaeoecology, 585: 110718.
