= Erik Hauri =

American geochemist (1966–2018)

- Born: Erik Harold Hauri; April 25, 1966; Waukegan, Illinois, US
- Died: September 5, 2018 (aged 52); North Potomac, Maryland, US
- Education: University of Miami (B.S.); Massachusetts Institute of Technology/Woods Hole Oceanographic Institution (Ph.D.)
- Awards: Houtermans Award (1999); James B. Macelwane Medal (2000)
- Scientific career
- Fields: Geochemistry
- Institutions: Carnegie Institution for Science
- Thesis: Geochemical and Fluid Dynamic Investigations into the Nature of Chemical Heterogeneity in the Earth's Mantle (1992)
- Doctoral advisor: Stanley R. Hart

Erik Harold Hauri (April 25, 1966 – September 5, 2018) was an American geochemist at the Carnegie Institution for Science. He researched the movement of matter inside planets and how volatile compounds such as water originated on Earth and other planetary bodies, and their effects on volcanic systems.

== Early life and education ==
Hauri was born on April 25, 1966, in Waukegan, Illinois, and was raised in Richmond, Illinois. His mother, Karen, was a homemaker and his father, Lawrence, was an automotive mechanic. Lawrence was an enthusiastic fisherman who took Hauri on fishing trips, sparking a lifelong interest in the outdoors. Hauri had one brother and one sister.

Hauri attended Richmond-Burton Community High School. As the first in his family to attend college, he graduated with his B.S. from the University of Miami in 1988 with a double major in geology and marine science. He completed his Ph.D. at the Massachusetts Institute of Technology/Woods Hole Oceanographic Institution Joint Program in Oceanography in 1992.

== Career ==
Hauri worked as a postdoctoral investigator at the Woods Hole Oceanographic Institution and then assumed the position of staff scientist in the Department of Terrestrial Magnetism at the Carnegie Institution for Science in 1994. He also directed the Ion Microprobe Facility, where scientists can make micron-scale measurements of the isotopic and elemental composition of minerals.

In 1999, Hauri received the Houtermans Award from the European Association of Geochemistry. The following year he was awarded the James B. Macelwane Medal by the American Geophysical Union for significant contributions to the geophysical sciences by a young scientist of outstanding ability.

Since 2011, he served on the Executive Committee of the Deep Carbon Observatory and as co-chair of its Reservoirs and Fluxes Community. He was a member of the Geological Society of America, American Astronomical Society, and the American Association for the Advancement of Science, and was named a fellow of the American Geophysical Union and the Geochemical Society.

== Research ==
In his research, Hauri analyzed isotopes of different elements and uses modeling and seismic imaging techniques to understand the processes occurring inside the rocky planets and how these processes contributed to planetary evolution. One of these processes is volcanism. He studied how melting magma and eruptions impact the distribution of certain elements and volatile compounds inside of planets. In 2011, Hauri reported in Science that Moon sediments brought back on the Apollo 17 mission contained 100 times more water than previously reported, suggesting that the Moon likely holds larger quantities of water than previously expected. Further studies of the isotopes in lunar water suggest that the water originated on Earth.

== Personal life and death ==
Hauri was married and had three children. He died of cancer on September 5, 2018, at his home in North Potomac, Maryland, aged 52.
