= Fossil water =

Ancient isolated water body

Fossil water, fossil groundwater, or paleowater is an ancient body of water that has been contained in some undisturbed space, typically groundwater in an aquifer, for millennia. Other types of fossil water can include subglacial lakes, such as Antarctica's Lake Vostok. UNESCO defines fossil groundwater as "water that infiltrated usually millennia ago and often under climatic conditions different from the present, and that has been stored underground since that time."

Determining the time since water infiltrated usually involves analyzing isotopic signatures. Determining "fossil" status—whether or not that particular water has occupied that particular space since the distant past—involves modeling the flow, recharge, and losses of aquifers, which can involve significant uncertainty. Some aquifers are hundreds of meters deep and underlie vast areas of land. Research techniques in the field are developing quickly and the scientific knowledge base is growing. In the cases of many aquifers, research is lacking or disputed as to the age of the water and the behavior of the water inside the aquifer.

== Renewability ==
Large, prolific aquifers (notably the Nubian Sandstone Aquifer System and the Ogallala Aquifer) containing fossil water are of significant socio-economic value. Fossil water is extracted from these aquifers for many human purposes, notably, agriculture, industry, and consumption. In arid regions, some aquifers containing available and usable water receive little to no significant recharge, effectively making groundwater in those aquifers a non-renewable resource. Extraction rates greater than recharge rates result in lowering of the water table and can lead to groundwater depletion. Extraction of non-renewable groundwater resources is referred to as groundwater "mining" because of their finite nature.

== General geology ==
Aquifers are typically composed of semi-porous rock or unconsolidated material whose pore space has been filled with water. In the relatively rare cases of confined aquifers, an impermeable geologic layer (e.g. clay or calcrete) encloses an aquifer, isolating the water within, sometimes for millennia. More commonly, fossil water is found in arid or semi-arid regions where the climate was significantly more humid in recent geologic history. In some semi-arid regions, the majority of precipitation evaporates before it can infiltrate and result in any significant aquifer recharge.

Most fossil groundwater has been estimated to have originally infiltrated within the Holocene and Pleistocene (10,000–40,000 years ago). Some fossil groundwater is associated with the melting of ice in the time since the last glacial maximum. Dating of groundwater relies on measuring concentrations of certain stable isotopes, including ^{3}H (tritium) and ^{18}O ("heavy" oxygen), and comparing values with known concentrations of the geologic past.

Fossil water can potentially dissolve and absorb a number of ions from its host rock. Salinity in groundwater can be higher than seawater. In some cases, some form of treatment is required to make these waters suitable for human use. Saline fossil aquifers can also store significant quantities of oil and natural gas.

== Notable bodies of fossil water ==
=== Ogallala Aquifer ===
The Ogallala or High Plains Aquifer sits under 450,000 km^{2} of 8 states of the United States of America. It is one of the largest freshwater deposits in the world. The aquifer is composed of unconsolidated alluvial deposits. Groundwater in this aquifer has been dated to have been deposited in the humid time following the last glacial maximum. In much of the aquifer's area, an impermeable layer of calcrete prevents precipitation from infiltrating. In other regions of the aquifer, some relatively small rates of recharge have been measured.

The aquifer supplies water for the many people who live above it and for widespread agricultural uses. In many areas, the water table has dropped drastically due to heavy extraction. Depletion rates are not stabilizing; in fact, they have been increasing in recent decades.

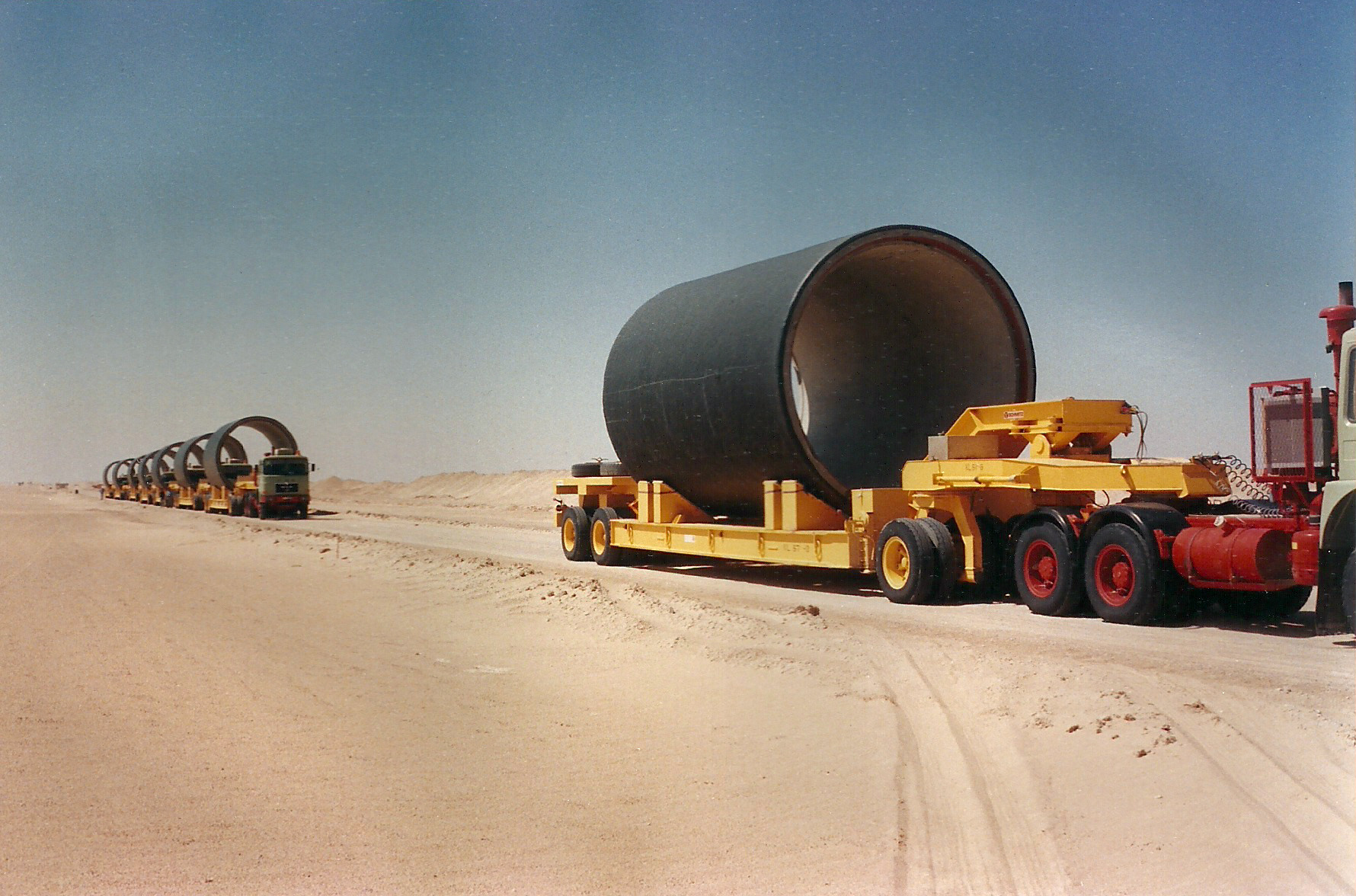
Transport of pipe segments for the Great Manmade River in Libya: a network of pipes that supplies water from the Nubian Sandstone Aquifer System.

=== Nubian Sandstone Aquifer System ===
The Nubian Sandstone Aquifer System is located in northeastern Africa, under the nations of Sudan, Libya, Egypt, and Chad, covering about 2,000,000 km^{2}. It is largely composed of many hydraulically interconnected sandstone aquifers. Some parts of the system are considered to be confined, if somewhat leaky, due to impermeable layers such as marine shales. The water was deposited between 4,000 and 20,000 years ago, varying by specific locality.

The water in the Nubian Sandstone Aquifer System is of high importance to the people living above it, and has been for millennia. In modern times, as demand increases, avoiding rapid depletion and international conflict will depend on careful cross-boundary monitoring and planning. Libya and Egypt are currently planning development projects to withdraw significant amounts of the aquifer's fossil water for use.

Other fossil aquifers have been identified throughout Northern Africa as well.

=== Guarani Aquifer ===
Located in southern Brazil and northern Argentina, the Guarani Aquifer is the second-biggest aquifer in the world. Its location is adequately watered at the surface by ordinary rain. Therefore its big reservoir of water is not as economically valuable as the aquifers located in arid regions. The water in the Guarani Aquifer is confined under hundreds of meters of overhead rock. The water has been assessed to be 120,000 years old in some zones, while in some other zones it may be 4,000 years of age.

=== Kalahari Desert aquifers ===
The Kalahari Desert is in central southern Africa (Botswana, Namibia, and South Africa). Geology of the area includes significant karst formations. Most of the precipitation in the region evaporates before it can contribute to significant recharge of the aquifers below. Whether or not the region's aquifers receive any significant recharge has long been the subject of debate and research. In the northern region of the Kalahari, a deep aquifer in cave sandstone was found to have isotopic signatures that suggested it had been confined with little to no leakage for long periods of time.

== See also ==
- Artesian aquifer
- Water scarcity
- Water pollution
  - Groundwater contamination
- Overdrafting
