= Ying Fan Reinfelder =

Chinese–American earth scientist and academic

- Education: Utah State University; University of Utah; Beijing University of Civil Engineering and Architecture
- Scientific career
- Workplaces: Rutgers University; Princeton University; Massachusetts Institute of Technology
- Thesis: Groundwater flow in closed desert basins: Insights from numerical experiments (1992)

Ying Fan Reinfelder is a Chinese–American earth scientist who is a professor and researcher in the Rutgers University Institute of Earth, Ocean, and Atmospheric Sciences. She is interested in climate dynamics and the global water cycle. She was named a Fellow of the American Geophysical Union in 2022.

== Early life and education ==
Reinfelder earned a B.S. in engineering from the Beijing University of Civil Engineering and Architecture. She moved to the United States for graduate studies, earning a master's degree in geography at the University of Utah. She was a doctoral researcher at Utah State University, where her research considered density-driven ground water flow in desert basins. After earning her doctorate, Reinfelder joined Massachusetts Institute of Technology as a postdoctoral researcher. She also completed a postdoctoral fellowship at Princeton University.

== Research and career ==
Reinfelder is a professor in the Rutgers University Department of Earth and Planetary Sciences. Her research considers hydrology, and how water impacts the function and structure of planet Earth.

In 2017, Reinfelder demonstrated that soil hydrology influenced global patterns of plant root depths.

== Awards and honors ==
- 2022 Elected Fellow of the American Geophysical Union
- 2022 Elected Fellow of the American Association for the Advancement of Science

== Selected publications ==
- Richard G. Taylor; Bridget Scanlon; Petra Döll; et al. (November 25, 2012). "Ground water and climate change". Nature Climate Change. 3 (4): 322–329. Bibcode:2013NatCC...3..322T. doi:10.1038/nclimate1744. ISSN 1758-678X. Wikidata Q57874440.
- Y. Fan; H. Li; G. Miguez-Macho (February 1, 2013). "Global patterns of groundwater table depth". Science. 339 (6122): 940–943. doi:10.1126/science.1229881. ISSN 0036-8075. PMID 23430651. Wikidata Q34594782.
- Jens Kattge; Gerhard Bönisch; Sandra M. Díaz; et al. (December 31, 2019). "TRY plant trait database - enhanced coverage and open access". Global Change Biology. 26 (1): 119–188. doi:10.1111/gcb.14904. ISSN 1354-1013. PMID 31891233. Wikidata Q92348862.
