= Iranian plateau water transfer project =

Iranian government desalination program

- Ministry: energy
- Website: https://was-co.ir/

A water transfer project to the central Iranian plateau has been developed by the Iranian government. The program is to bring water from the Gulf of Oman and Persian Gulf after desalination to 7 to 16 Iranian provinces. It will take drinking water to Sistan and Baluchistan cities water network by 2024. Its current budget is as of 2021 around $285 billion. Around 3700 kilometer pipe has been laid for the program. There are three phases for the program, phase 4 has been added. 190 corporations are share holders. Phase 1 has been put operational.

== Construction / scope ==
The WASCO Persian Gulf Water supply and transfer corporation has been in charge of the project. Water pipes network are steel pipes.

Drinking water will be supplied to Kerman.

== Criticism ==
The projects could cause ecological issues.
