= Robert V. Tauxe =

- Born: Robert Tauxe
- Employer: Centers for Disease Control and Prevention

Robert V. Tauxe was the Director of the Division of Foodborne, Waterborne and Environmental Diseases of the Centers for Disease Control and Prevention.

He received a BA in cultural anthropology and a Masters in Public Health from Yale, an MD from Vanderbilt, and is board certified in Internal Medicine. After two years as an Epidemic Intelligence Service officer at the Centers for Disease Control and Prevention, he joined the scientific staff at the CDC in 1985 as a member of the U.S. Public Health Service. Following his retirement after 25 years of service in the USPHS he continued in the CDC administration as a civilian employee. He holds faculty appointments at the Emory University School of Public Health in the Department of International Health as well as the Emory University Department of Biology. He has authored or co-authored more than 250 scientific journal articles, letters and book chapters.

Tauxe's research interests include bacterial enteric diseases, epidemiology and pathogenesis of infectious diseases, epidemiological and clinical consequences of bacterial genetic exchange, antimicrobial use and resistance to antimicrobial agents, and teaching epidemiological methods. He has participated in or supervised numerous domestic and overseas epidemiological investigations all over the world, most notably the 1984 Rajneeshee bioterror attack, the 2008 United States salmonellosis outbreak, the 2010-2013 Haiti cholera outbreak, establishment of Pulsenet, and the West African Ebola virus epidemic.

In comments on the June 2011 E. coli O104:H4 outbreak in Europe, because three cases had appeared in the U.S., he stated that the supposedly new aggressive enterohemorrhagic and enteroaggregative strain had been seen before in the early 1990s (contrary to some other professional statements of other prominent microbiological experts and physicians in Europe). Although it can produce bloody diarrhea, severe dehydration requiring fluid replacement therapy, and hemolytic uremic syndrome- HUS- which can lead to permanent kidney impairment or failure or death, it is not the same strain and is much newer and likely even more aggressive than the much better known and more common E. coli O157:H7 strain. E. coli strains, both pathological and naturally occurring non-pathological ones, in the human intestinal tract trade genetic characteristics among themselves- and among other microbially related species- fairly easily, allowing for more aggressive and thus more resistant strains to develop. Even if the strain dates back to the early 1990s, it would still be relatively new as a major health concern, and treatment- which is harder for any new and severe strain- is (like for other pathological E. coli strains) mainly supportive.

Dr. Tauxe retired from the CDC in June 2023.
