= Great Man-Made River =

Pipes supplying water to northern Libya

Coordinates: 25°27′20″N 21°36′03″E

Schematic drawing of the project. Note that different routes have been proposed for the not-yet-implemented phases (dashed). Tobruk may for instance end up connected to Ajdabiya instead of to the Jaghboub well field.

The Great Man-Made River Project (Arabic: النهر الصناعي العظيم, romanized: an-nahr aṣ-ṣināʿiyy al-ʿaẓīm, abbreviated GMRP) is a network of pipes that supplies fresh water obtained from the Nubian Sandstone Aquifer System, a fossil aquifer, across Libya. It is the world's largest irrigation project.

The project utilizes a pipeline system that pumps water from the Nubian Sandstone Aquifer System, in southern Libya, to cities along the populous northern Mediterranean coast of Libya, including Tripoli and Benghazi. The water covers a distance of up to 1,600 kilometers and provides 70% of all fresh water used in Libya.

According to the project's website, it is the largest underground network of pipes (2,820 kilometres (1,750 mi)) and aqueducts in the world. It consists of more than 1,300 wells, most of which are over 500 m deep, and supplies 6,500,000 m^{3} of fresh water per day to the cities of Tripoli, Benghazi, Sirte and elsewhere in Libya. Libyan leader Muammar Gaddafi described it as the "Eighth Wonder of the World".

== History ==
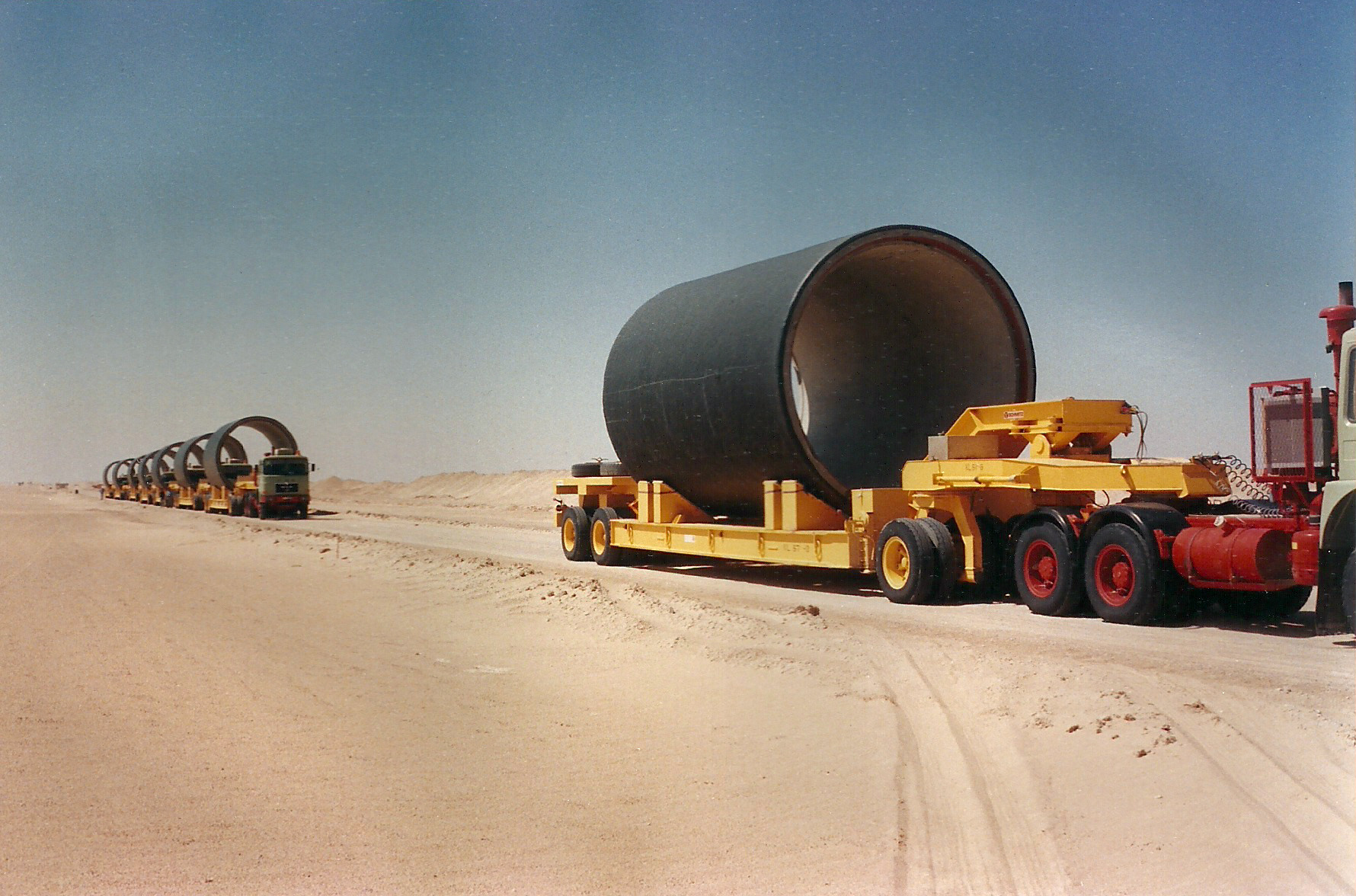
Transport of pipe segments in the 1980s.

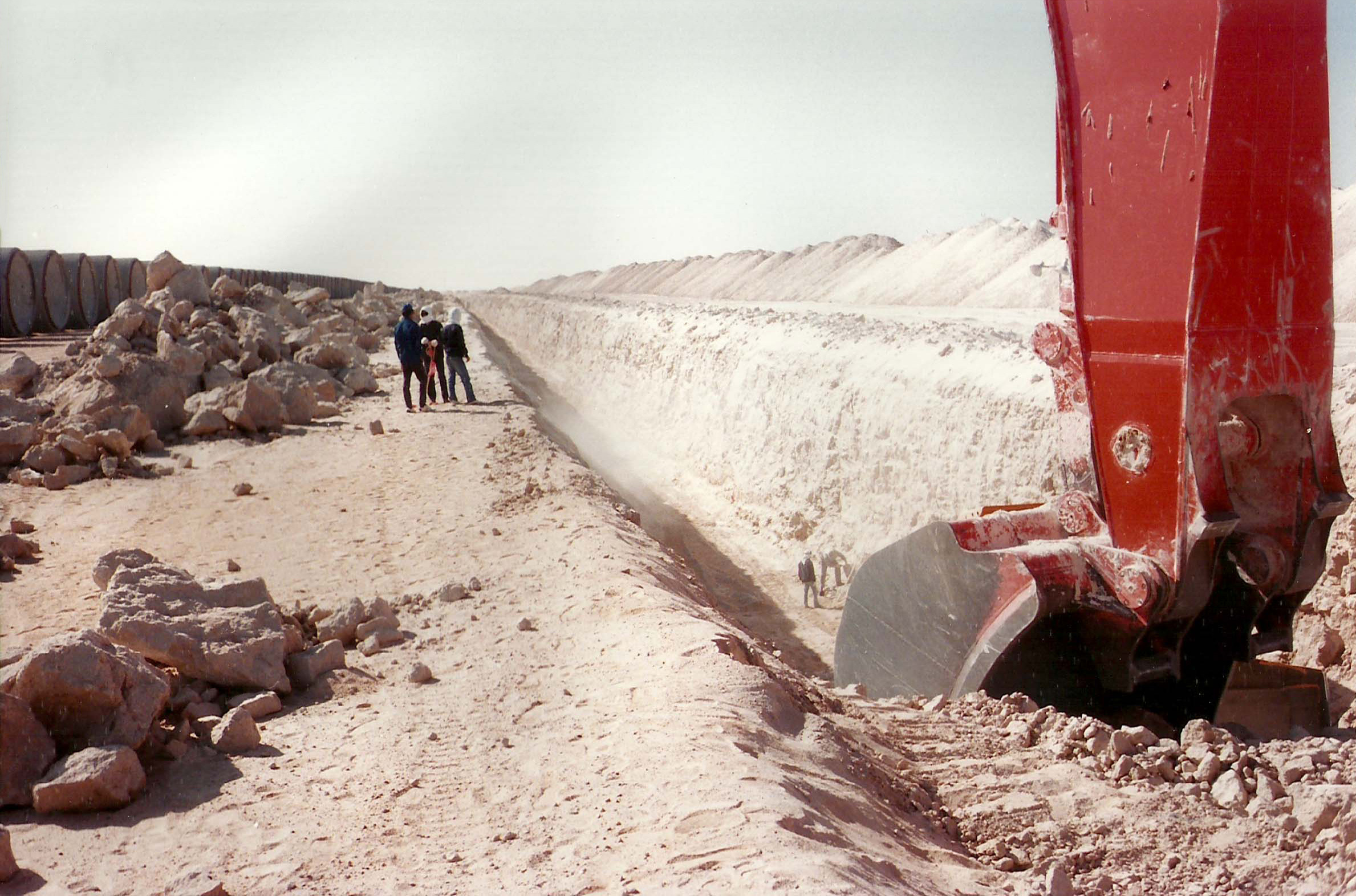
Trench digging in the 1980s.

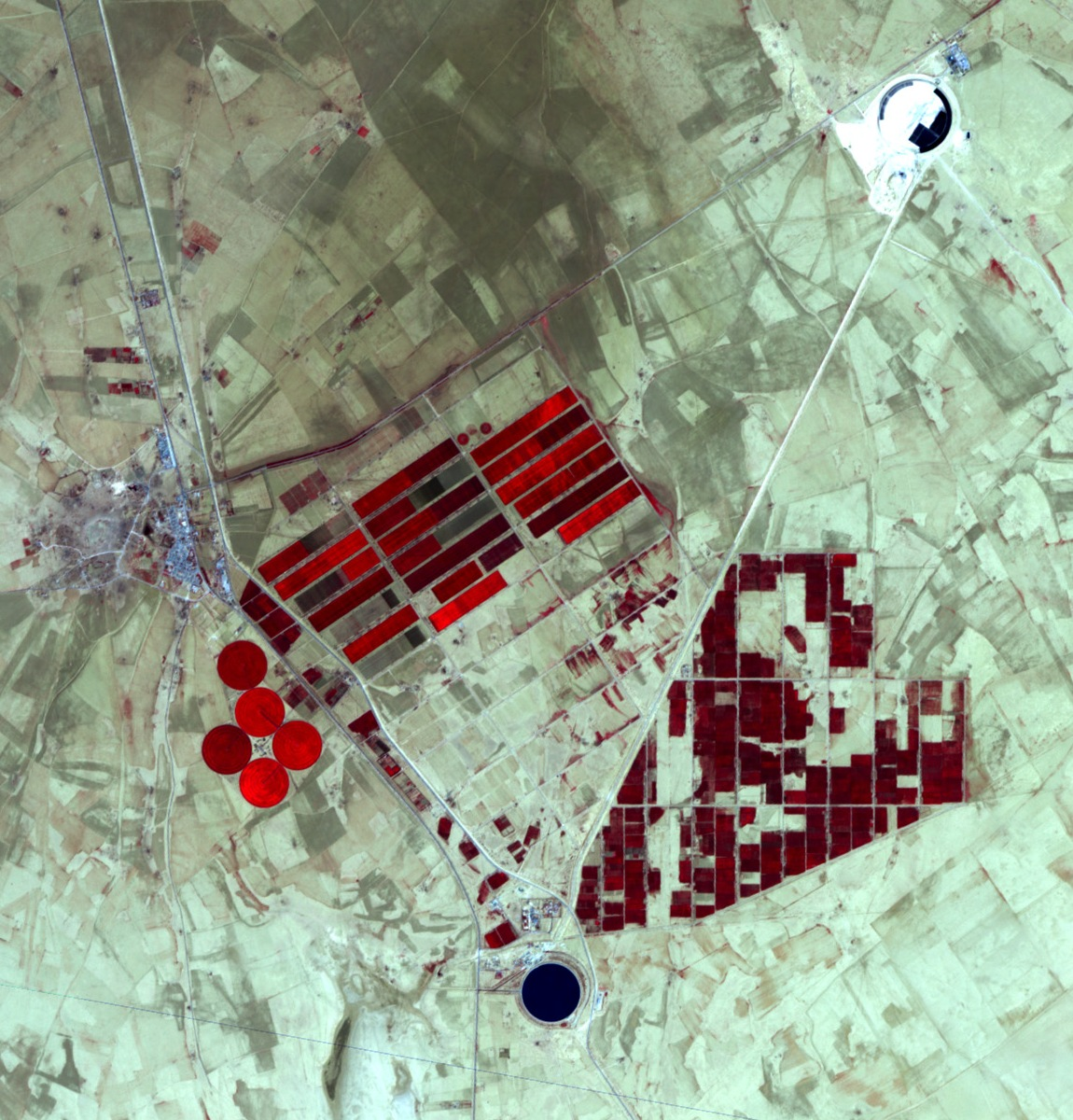
False-color image of the Grand Omar Mukhtar reservoir project south of Benghazi. Water (dark blue) residing in reservoirs appears twice in this image, in the upper right and at the bottom. Vegetation appears red, cityscape structures such as pavement and buildings appear in gray, bare ground appears tan or beige.

In 1953, efforts to find oil in southern Libya led to the discovery of large quantities of potable fossil water underground. The Great Man-Made River Project (GMRP) was conceived in the late 1960s and work on the project began in 1984. The project's construction was divided into five phases. The first phase required 85 million m³ of excavation and was inaugurated on 28 August 1991. The second phase (dubbed First water to Tripoli) was inaugurated on 1 September 1996.

The project is owned by the Great Man-Made River Project Authority and was funded by the Gaddafi government. The primary contractor for the first phases was Dong Ah Consortium (a South Korean company) and the present main contractor is Al Nahr Company Ltd.

Imported goods which were destined for use in the construction of the GMRP were made in Korea and Europe (mainly in Italy) and arrived by sea via the entry port of Brega (Gulf of Sidra). Cathodic corrosion protection on the pipeline was supplied by an Australian company, AMAC Corrosion Protection, based in Melbourne and delivered via the port of Benghazi. The rest of the material was made in Libya.

The total cost of the GMRP was projected at more than US$25 billion. Libya has completed the work to date without the financial support of major countries or loans from world banks. Since 1990, UNESCO has provided training to engineers and technicians involved with the project.

The fossil aquifer from which this water is being supplied is the Nubian Sandstone Aquifer System. It accumulated during the last ice age and is not currently being replenished. If 2007 rates of retrieval are not increased, the water could last a thousand years. Other estimates indicate that the aquifer could be depleted of water as early as 60 to 100 years. Analysts say that the costs of the $25 billion groundwater extraction system are 10% those of desalination.

In this project one billion euros were invested for the installation of 50,000 artificial palm trees for water condensation. This project was carried out by the Spanish engineer Antonio Ibáñez de Alba.

On 22 July 2011, during the First Libyan Civil War and the foreign military intervention, one of the two plants making pipes for the project, the Brega Plant, was hit by a NATO air strike. At a press conference on 26 July, NATO claimed that rockets had been fired from within the plant area, and that military material, including multiple rocket launchers, was stored there according to intelligence findings, presenting two photos of an BM-21 MRL as sole evidence for the destruction of the factory. The evidence for a potential breach of UN resolutions has been insufficient.

During the Second Libyan Civil War from 2014 to 2020, the water infrastructure suffered neglect and occasional breakdowns. As of July 2019, 101 of 479 wells on the western pipeline system had been dismantled.

On 10 April 2020, a station controlling water flow to Tripoli and neighboring towns was seized by an unknown armed group. The flow of water was cut to over two million people as a result, and as such the attack was condemned by the United Nations on humanitarian grounds.

== Timeline ==
- 3 October 1983: The General People's Congress held an extraordinary session to draft the resolutions of the Basic People's Congresses, which decided to fund and execute the Great Man-Made River Project.
- 28 August 1984: Muammar Gaddafi laid the foundation stone in Sarir area for the commencement of the construction of the Great Man-Made River Project.
- 28 August 1986: Muammar Gaddafi inaugurated the Brega plant for the production of the pre-stressed concrete cylinder pipes, which are considered the largest pipes made with pre-stressed steel wire (the majority of steel wire was made in Italy by the Redaelli Tecna S.p.A. company with its head office in Cologno Monzese-Milan and its factory in Caivano-Naples). The Sarir plant was also inaugurated on this date.
- 26 August 1989: Muammar Gaddafi laid the foundation stone for phase two of the Great Man-Made River Project.

=== First water arrival ===
- 11 September 1989: to Ajdabiya reservoir.
- 28 September 1989: to Grand Omar Muktar reservoir.
- 4 September 1991: to Ghardabiya reservoir.
- 28 August 1996: to Tripoli.
- 28 September 2007: to Gharyan.

== Gallery ==
Great Manmade River images

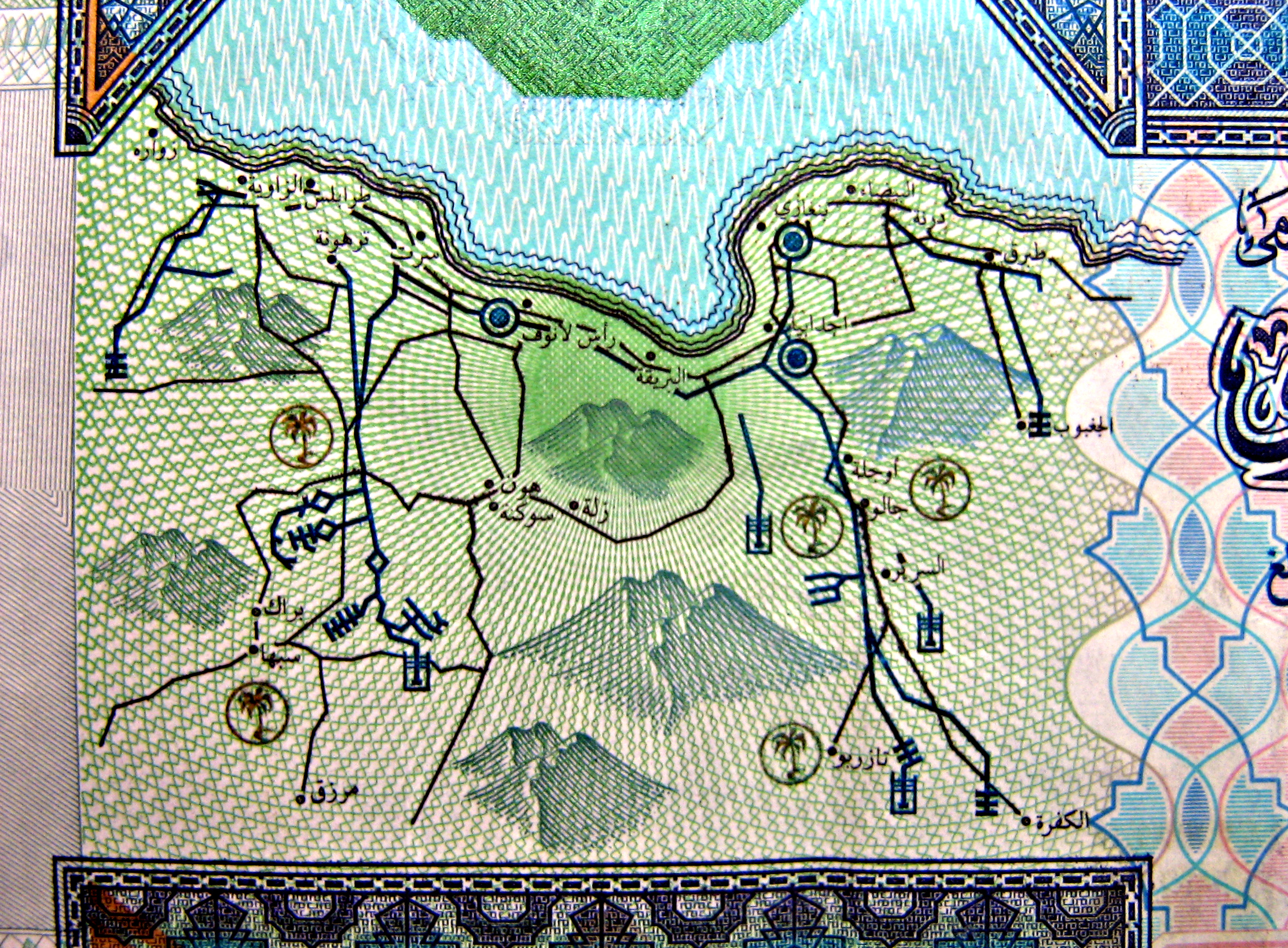
GMMR - 20 dinar note (2002)

GMMRA logo

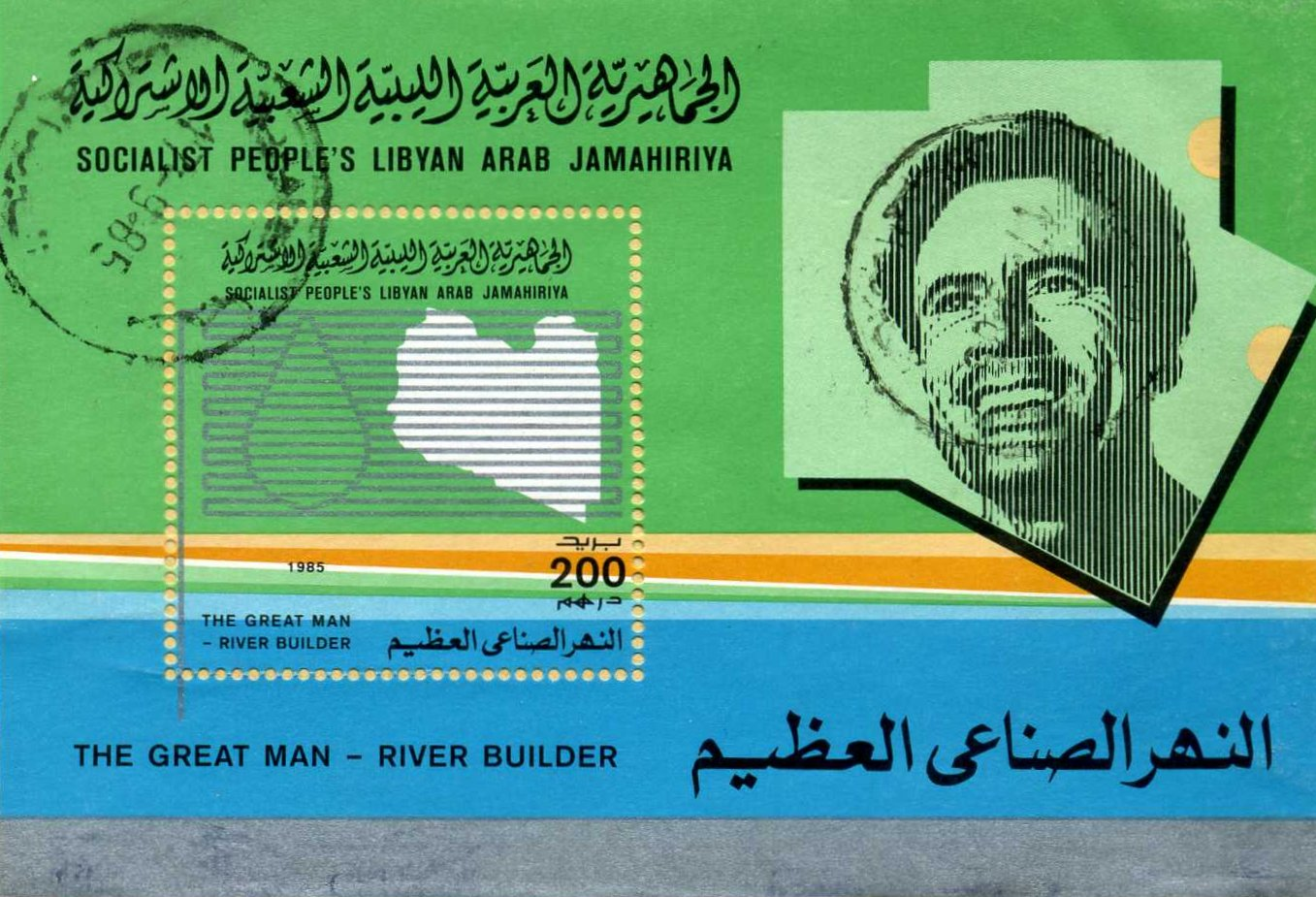
Stamp commemorating Gaddafi as "River Builder"

== See also ==
- Center pivot irrigation
- Dragon's Breath Cave: another fossil water store in an arid area in Africa
- Qanat
- Water transfer to central Iranian plateau

== Additional sources ==
- BBC News: Libya's thirst for 'fossil water' (article contains map of pipe network)
- Project article at Encyclopædia Britannica
- TEKFEN İNŞAAT official article
