= List of members of the National Academy of Sciences (geology) =

This list is a subsection of the List of members of the National Academy of Sciences, which includes members and international members of the United States National Academy of Sciences, living and deceased, each affiliated with one of the academy's disciplinary sections. Members are listed under their primary section, and each entry gives the person's name, primary institution, and election year. For deceased members, the year of death is noted.

| Name | Institution | Year |
|---|---|---|
| Philip H. Abelson (died 2004) | American Association for the Advancement of Science | 1959 |
| Francis Albarède | Ecole Normale Superieure de Lyon | 2025 |
| Claude Allègre (died 2025) | Institut de Physique du Globe de Paris | 1985 |
| Clarence Allen (died 2021) | California Institute of Technology | 1976 |
| Walter Alvarez | University of California, Berkeley | 1991 |
| Don L. Anderson (died 2014) | California Institute of Technology | 1982 |
| Charles Alfred Anderson (died 1990) | United States Geological Survey | 1957 |
| Robert S. Anderson | University of Colorado Boulder | 2021 |
| Brian F. Atwater | U.S. Geological Survey | 2007 |
| Tanya Atwater | University of California, Santa Barbara | 1997 |
| Jean-Philippe Avouac | California Institute of Technology | 2025 |
| Jillian F. Banfield | University of California, Berkeley | 2006 |
| Edouard G. Bard | Collège de France | 2014 |
| Paul B. Barton (died 2021) | U.S. Geological Survey | 1978 |
| Michael L. Bender | Princeton University | 2001 |
| William A. Berggren | Rutgers, The State University of New Jersey, New Brunswick | 1989 |
| Robert Berner (died 2015) | Yale University | 1987 |
| Nicolas J. Beukes (died 2023) | University of Johannesburg | 2022 |
| Marland P. Billings (died 1996) | Harvard University | 1968 |
| Joel D. Blum | University of Michigan | 2020 |
| Robert J. Bodnar | Virginia Polytechnic Institute and State University | 2023 |
| Samuel A. Bowring (died 2019) | Massachusetts Institute of Technology | 2015 |
| Francis R. Boyd (died 2004) | Carnegie Institution of Washington | 1971 |
| Edward Boyle | Massachusetts Institute of Technology | 2008 |
| William F. Brace (died 2012) | Massachusetts Institute of Technology | 1971 |
| Susan L. Brantley | Pennsylvania State University | 2012 |
| Emily E. Brodsky | University of California, Santa Cruz | 2023 |
| Wallace S. Broecker (died 2019) | Lamont-Doherty Earth Observatory of Columbia University | 1977 |
| M. J. Buerger (died 1986) | Massachusetts Institute of Technology | 1953 |
| B. Clark Burchfiel (died 2024) | Massachusetts Institute of Technology | 1985 |
| Doug Burbank | University of California, Santa Barbara | 2010 |
| Donald E. Canfield | University of Southern Denmark | 2007 |
| Richard W. Carlson | Carnegie Institution for Science | 2012 |
| Katharine V. Cashman | University of Oregon | 2016 |
| Thure E. Cerling | University of Utah | 2001 |
| Peter U. Clark | Oregon State University | 2025 |
| Preston Cloud (died 1991) | University of California, Santa Barbara | 1961 |
| Robert Coleman (died 2020) | Stanford University | 1980 |
| Douglas Coombs (died 2016) | University of Otago | 1977 |
| Allan Cox (died 1987) | Stanford University | 1969 |
| John C. Crowell (died 2015) | University of California, Santa Barbara | 1981 |
| G. Brent Dalrymple | Oregon State University | 1993 |
| George H. Denton | University of Maine | 2002 |
| Donald J. DePaolo | University of California, Berkeley | 1993 |
| John Dewey | University of Oxford | 1997 |
| William Dickinson (died 2015) | University of Arizona | 1992 |
| James H. Dieterich | University of California, Riverside | 2003 |
| William E. Dietrich | University of California, Berkeley | 2003 |
| Richard Doell (died 2008) | U.S. Geological Survey | 1969 |
| Patricia Dove | Virginia Tech | 2012 |
| Mary Droser | University of California, Riverside | 2025 |
| Thomas Dunne | University of California, Santa Barbara | 1988 |
| R. Lawrence Edwards | University of Minnesota | 2011 |
| John M. Eiler | California Institute of Technology | 2016 |
| Linda T. Elkins-Tanton | University of California, Berkeley | 2021 |
| K. O. Emery (died 1998) | Woods Hole Oceanographic Institution | 1971 |
| Albert E. J. Engel (died 1995) | University of California, San Diego | 1970 |
| W. G. Ernst | Stanford University | 1975 |
| Hans P. Eugster (died 1987) | Johns Hopkins University School of Medicine | 1972 |
| Kenneth A. Farley | California Institute of Technology | 2013 |
| James Farquhar | University of Maryland, College Park | 2019 |
| Alfred G. Fischer (died 2017) | University of Southern California | 1994 |
| Marilyn L. Fogel (died 2022) | University of California, Riverside | 2019 |
| Donald W. Forsyth | Brown University | 2006 |
| Katherine Freeman | Pennsylvania State University | 2013 |
| Augusto Gansser (died 2012) | Swiss Federal Institute of Technology | 1971 |
| Robert M. Garrels (died 1988) | University of South Florida | 1962 |
| Sigurður R. Gíslason | University of Iceland | 2024 |
| Jean Goguel (died 1987) | Bureau de Recherches Géologiques et Minières | 1973 |
| John Grotzinger | California Institute of Technology | 2002 |
| Timothy L. Grove | Massachusetts Institute of Technology | 2014 |
| James Hall (died 1898) | New York State Museum of Natural History | 1863 |
| Alexander N. Halliday | University of Oxford | 2015 |
| Warren B. Hamilton (died 2018) | Colorado School of Mines | 1989 |
| James M. Harrison (died 1990) | Geological Survey of Canada | 1965 |
| T. Mark Harrison | University of California, Los Angeles | 2011 |
| Stanley Hart | Woods Hole Oceanographic Institution | 1983 |
| John Hayes (died 2017) | Woods Hole Oceanographic Institution | 1998 |
| C. Vance Haynes Jr. | University of Arizona | 1990 |
| Hollis D. Hedberg (died 1988) | Princeton University | 1960 |
| Marc M. Hirschmann | University of Minnesota | 2020 |
| James Gregory Hirth | Brown University | 2024 |
| Paul F. Hoffman | University of Victoria | 1992 |
| Albrecht Hofmann | Max Planck Institute for Chemistry | 1999 |
| Heinrich Holland (died 2012) | Harvard University | 1979 |
| Kenneth Hsu | Swiss Federal Institute of Technology | 1986 |
| M. King Hubbert (died 1989) | United States Geological Survey | 1955 |
| John Imbrie (died 2016) | Brown University | 1978 |
| Edward Irving (died 2014) | Geological Survey of Canada | 1998 |
| Harold L. James (died 2000) | U.S. Geological Survey | 1962 |
| Raymond Jeanloz | University of California, Berkeley | 2004 |
| Thomas Jordan | University of Southern California | 1998 |
| Jean Jouzel | Laboratoire des Sciences du Climat et de L'Environnement | 2016 |
| Barclay Kamb (died 2011) | California Institute of Technology | 1990 |
| James F. Kasting | Pennsylvania State University | 2018 |
| Peter B. Kelemen | Lamont-Doherty Earth Observatory of Columbia University | 2014 |
| James P. Kennett | University of California, Santa Barbara | 2000 |
| Dennis Kent | Rutgers, The State University of New Jersey, New Brunswick | 2004 |
| Susan Kieffer | University of Illinois at Urbana–Champaign | 1986 |
| Andrew Knoll | Harvard University | 1991 |
| David L. Kohlstedt | University of Minnesota | 2009 |
| Konrad B. Krauskopf (died 2003) | Stanford University | 1959 |
| Lee R. Kump | Pennsylvania State University | 2022 |
| Ikuo Kushiro | University of Tokyo | 1983 |
| Arthur Lachenbruch (died 2021) | U.S. Geological Survey | 1975 |
| Walter B. Langbein (died 1982) | U.S. Geological Survey | 1970 |
| Charles H. Langmuir | Harvard University | 2006 |
| Meave G. Leakey | Turkana Basin Institute | 2013 |
| Luna Leopold (died 2006) | University of California, Berkeley | 1967 |
| Waldemar Lindgren (died 1939) | U.S. Geological Survey | 1909 |
| Thomas S. Lovering (died 1991) | U.S. Geological Survey | 1949 |
| Heinz A. Lowenstam (died 1993) | California Institute of Technology | 1980 |
| Michael Manga | University of California, Berkeley | 2018 |
| Ho-kwang Mao | Carnegie Institution of Washington | 1993 |
| Dan P. McKenzie | University of Cambridge | 1988 |
| Digby J. McLaren (died 2004) | Royal Society of Canada | 1979 |
| Marcia McNutt | National Academy of Sciences | 2005 |
| Harry Y. McSween Jr. | The University of Tennessee, Knoxville | 2021 |
| H. William Menard Jr. (died 1986) | Scripps Institution of Oceanography | 1968 |
| Dorothy J. Merritts | Franklin & Marshall College | 2022 |
| Isabel P. Montañez | University of California, Davis | 2021 |
| Alexandra Navrotsky | Arizona State University | 1993 |
| Norman D. Newell (died 2005) | American Museum of Natural History | 1979 |
| Thomas B. Nolan (died 1992) | U.S. Geological Survey | 1951 |
| Jack Oliver (died 2011) | Cornell University | 1984 |
| Paul E. Olsen | Columbia University | 2008 |
| Neil Opdyke (died 2019) | University of Florida | 1996 |
| E. Ronald Oxburgh | University of Cambridge | 2001 |
| Gary Parker | University of Illinois at Urbana–Champaign | 2017 |
| Clair C. Patterson (died 1995) | California Institute of Technology | 1987 |
| Ann Pearson | Harvard University | 2024 |
| F. J. Pettijohn (died 1999) | Johns Hopkins University | 1966 |
| Walter C. Pitman (died 2019) | Columbia University | 2000 |
| Terry A. Plank | Lamont-Doherty Earth Observatory of Columbia University | 2013 |
| Raymond A. Price (died 2024) | Queen's University | 1988 |
| Jay Quade (died 2025) | University of Arizona | 2024 |
| Victor A. Ramos | University of Buenos Aires | 2010 |
| John G. Ramsay (died 2021) | University of Zurich | 1985 |
| David M. Raup (died 2015) | University of Chicago | 1979 |
| Maureen E. Raymo | Lamont-Doherty Earth Observatory of Columbia University | 2016 |
| Frank M. Richter | University of Chicago | 2001 |
| John Rodgers (died 2004) | Yale University | 1969 |
| Edwin Roedder (died 2006) | Harvard University | 1988 |
| Roberta L. Rudnick | University of California, Santa Barbara | 2010 |
| A. M. Celal Sengor | Istanbul Technical University | 2000 |
| Jeffrey P. Severinghaus | Scripps Institution of Oceanography | 2015 |
| Nicholas J. Shackleton (died 2006) | University of Cambridge | 2000 |
| Robert P. Sharp (died 2004) | California Institute of Technology | 1973 |
| Barbara Sherwood Lollar | University of Toronto | 2022 |
| Eugene M. Shoemaker (died 1997) | Lowell Observatory | 1980 |
| Kerry Sieh | Earth Observatory of Singapore | 1999 |
| Leon Silver (died 2022) | California Institute of Technology | 1974 |
| George G. Simpson (died 1984) | American Museum of Natural History | 1941 |
| Norman Sleep | Stanford University | 1999 |
| Joseph V. Smith (died 2007) | University of Chicago | 1986 |
| Nikolai Sobolev (died 2022) | Russian Academy of Sciences | 1993 |
| Steven M. Stanley | Florida State University | 1994 |
| Edward Stolper | California Institute of Technology | 1994 |
| Roger Summons | Massachusetts Institute of Technology | 2020 |
| John Suppe | University of Houston | 1995 |
| Lynn Sykes | Columbia University | 1978 |
| Paul Tapponnier (died 2023) | Nanyang Technological University | 2005 |
| Lisa Tauxe | University of California, San Diego | 2015 |
| Hugh Taylor (died 2021) | California Institute of Technology | 1981 |
| S. Ross Taylor (died 2021) | Australian National University | 1994 |
| George Thompson (died 2017) | Stanford University | 1992 |
| James B. Thompson, Jr. (died 2011) | Harvard University | 1967 |
| Lonnie Thompson | Ohio State University | 2005 |
| George Tilton (died 2010) | University of California, Santa Barbara | 1977 |
| D. Rudolf Trümpy (died 2009) | Swiss Federal Institute of Technology | 1978 |
| Francis J. Turner (died 1985) | University of California, Berkeley | 1956 |
| O. Frank Tuttle (died 1983) | Stanford University | 1968 |
| John W. Valley | University of Wisconsin–Madison | 2019 |
| Meenakshi Wadhwa | University of California, San Diego | 2023 |
| Richard J. Walker | University of Maryland, College Park | 2022 |
| David Walker | Columbia University | 1999 |
| Aaron C. Waters (died 1991) | AT&T Bell Laboratories | 1964 |
| E. Bruce Watson | Rensselaer Polytechnic Institute | 1997 |
| John W. Wells (died 1994) | Cornell University | 1968 |
| Kelin X. Whipple | Arizona State University | 2025 |
| Donald E. White (died 2002) | U.S. Geological Survey | 1973 |
| Peter J Wyllie | California Institute of Technology | 1981 |
| Shuhai Xiao | Virginia Polytechnic Institute and State University | 2023 |
| Hatten S. Yoder Jr. (died 2003) | Carnegie Institution of Washington | 1958 |
| James C. Zachos | University of California, Santa Cruz | 2017 |
| E-An Zen (died 2014) | University of Maryland, College Park | 1976 |
| Mary Lou Zoback | U.S. Geological Survey | 1995 |
