= Suzanne Baldwin =

American geologist

- Education: Hobart & William Smith Colleges; SUNY Albany
- Scientific career
- Fields: Thermochronology
- Workplaces: Syracuse University
- Thesis: Thermochronology of a subduction complex in western Baja California (1988)
- Doctoral advisor: T. Mark Harrison
- Website: su-thermochronology.syr.edu

Suzanne Louise Baldwin is an American geologist and thermochronologist. She is the director of the Syracuse University Noble Gas Isotopic Research Laboratory (SUNGIRL) and is the Thonis Professor of Earth Sciences at Syracuse University. Baldwin's research deals with the field of thermochronology, where thermal evolution of the Earth's lithosphere and planetary materials is determined by heating minerals and rocks.

== Education ==
Baldwin graduated from the Hobart & William Smith Colleges in 1980. She earned MS and Ph.D. degrees from SUNY Albany, where she worked with T. Mark Harrison. She trained as a postdoctoral researcher at the School of Earth Sciences at Australian National University in Canberra, Australia.

== Career ==
Baldwin started her career as an assistant professor at the University of Arizona in 1991 and was promoted to Associate post in 1997. She joined Syracuse University's College of Arts and Sciences as a full professor in 2000.

Baldwin has collected rock samples wide range of places, including from Antarctica, Arizona, Papua New Guinea, the Pyrenees, New Zealand, and the Moon (Apollo 16 and Apollo 17 missions).

Baldwin is a member of the American Geophysical Union, Geological Society of America, Association for Women Geoscientists, Women in Science and Engineering, and Geochemical Society.

== Awards ==
Baldwin was awarded Syracuse University's Chancellor's Citation in 2010. She was elected a fellow of the Geological Society of America in 2005, and was the inaugural Marie Tharp Fellow at the Earth Institute of Columbia University in 2006.
