= John Frank Schairer =

American geochemist, mineralogist, and petrologist

J. Frank Schairer (13 April 1904, in Rochester, New York – 19 September 1970, near Point No Point, Maryland) was an American geochemist, mineralogist, and petrologist.

Schairer studied chemistry at Yale University with a bachelor's degree in 1925 and a doctorate in 1928. He was the president and one of the organizers of the undergraduate club "Yale Mineralogical Society" in 1923. In addition, he earned an M.S. in mineralogy. From 1927, he was a chemist at the Carnegie Institution Geophysical Laboratory in Washington, D.C. where he remained on the staff until mandatory retirement in 1969, when he became a part-time employee. He worked there with Norman L. Bowen in experimental petrology until Bowen's departure to the University Chicago in 1937. During World War II, the lab worked on military research (erosion in cannon and machine gun barrels). From the 1950s Schairer worked with Hatten Schuyler Yoder and Cecil Edgar Tilley on basalt fusions.

Schairer served from 1957 to 1960 as vice president of the International Association of Volcanology and Chemistry of the Earth's Interior, in 1944, vice president of the Geological Society of America, in 1960 president of the Geochemical Society and in 1943 president of the Mineralogical Society of America. He was also an accomplished botanist and co-founder of the National Capital Orchid Society (1947).

He married in 1940 and upon his death was survived by his widow, two children (twins), and four grandchildren.

== Honors and memberships ==
Schairer was elected in 1953 a member of the National Academy of Sciences and in 1968 an honorary member of the Deutsche Mineralogische Gesellschaft (German Mineralogical Society).

He received in 1953 the Arthur L. Day Medal and in 1963 the Roebling Medal.

In 2012 he was inducted into the Appalachian Trail Hall of Fame for his extensive work in marking (under his leadership over 260 miles from 1928 to 1932 through the Potomac Appalachian Trail Club founded by him).

A mineral described by William F. Foshag in 1931 received the name schairerite in his honor.
