= Michael Fleischer (mineralogist) =

- Fleischer from a 1981 article in Rocks and Minerals
- Born: 27 February 1908; Bridgeport, Connecticut, USA
- Died: 5 September 1998 (aged 90); Washington, D.C., USA
- Occupation: Mineralogist
- Known for: Glossary of Mineral Species

Michael Fleischer ( 27 February 1908 – 5 September 1998) was an American chemist and mineralogist. He worked as a geochemist with the U.S. Geological Survey from 1939 to 1978. He published a huge number of chemical abstracts and reviews of proposed mineral names, and is known for his authoritative Glossary of Mineral Species, first published in 1971.

== Early years (1908–39) ==
Michael Fleischer was born on 27 February 1908 in Bridgeport, Connecticut, the son of Hungarian Jewish immigrants. He studied chemistry and mineralogy at Yale University from 1927 to 1933. He obtained a Bachelor of Science degree magna cum laude in 1930 and a doctorate in physics in 1933. He graduated during the Great Depression. His first job was a chemist in a toothpaste factory. He married Helen Isenberg and they had two sons, Walter and David.

From 1933 to 1934 Fleischer was a research associate at Yale's Department of Chemistry. From 1934 to 1936 he was an assistant to Professor William Ebenezer Ford (1878–1939) and helped prepare a revision of James Dwight Dana's System of Mineralogy. In 1934 he began to contribute abstracts to Chemical Abstracts, and would eventually contribute about 37,000 abstracts. The last was published in 1994. For many years he edited the section on Mineralogical and Geological Chemistry in Chemical Abstracts. He moved to Washington in 1936, and from then until 1939 was a physical chemist at the Geophysical Laboratory of the Carnegie Institution for Science.

== U.S. Geological Survey (1939–78) ==
Fleischer worked as a geochemist with the United States Geological Survey from 1939 to 1978. He could read French, German and Russian, and translated about 900 Russian articles into English for the U.S. Geological Survey. Fleischer worked on the mineralogy of manganese oxides, and was coauthor of ten papers on this subject between 1942 and 1969. This work contributed greatly to the difficult problem of recognition of the manganese oxide minerals. For example, Fleischer and W. E. Richmond fully described the mineral ramsdellite in 1943, which they named after the mineralogist Lewis S. Ramsdell (1895–1975). In a 1944 paper Fleischer showed the importance of the manganese oxide mineral nsutite as a component of dry cell batteries.

Between 1944 and 1947 Fleischer led a group of researchers into raw materials for the Manhattan Project, including uranium, thorium and secondary products of atomic fission. His team prepared restricted reports on the geochemistry of gallium, gadolinium, beryllium, germanium, indium, niobium and tantalum. Fleischer was the coauthor with Judith W. Frondel of a glossary of minerals bearing uranium and thorium, published in four editions in 1950, 1952, 1955 and 1967. Between 1962 and 1989 he published 14 papers on the geochemistry of the lanthanide series of chemical elements. His interest in trace elements led him to study their effect on the human body. In the Fall 1970 issue of The Mineralogical Record Fleischer proposed in Some possible new minerals not yet found that BaF_{2} might exist in nature, but probably not in association with the highly soluble sulfate, phosphate or carbonate phases of barium. The associations of the mineral frankdicksonite are consistent with this observation.

== Mineral nomenclature ==
Fleischer is best known for his work on mineral nomenclature. He took charge of the New Mineral Names column of the American Mineralogist in February 1941 using the initials M.F. He succeeded William F. Foshag (1894–1956) in writing this column, which he continued for over 40 years, first alone and then after 1974 with associates. He was the first to address the problem of acceptance criteria for new minerals. Fleischer changed the format of the abstracts from brief reports to critical essays that pointed out unnecessary names, synonyms and names based on inadequate data. For example, in 1956 Fleischer noted that bursaite's X-ray data shows many coincidences between those of the minerals kobellite and cosalite. He added subsections on New Data and Discredited Minerals. Out of 583 new species proposed between 1941 and 1960, M.F. only accepted 311. In the same period 224 species names were discredited.

In 1959 Robert Lüling Parker, the first president of the International Mineralogical Association (IMA), appointed Fleischer chairman of the IMA Commission on New Minerals and Mineral Names, a position he held until 1974. This led naturally to his Glossary of Mineral Species, first published in 1971. The book is an important reference work that lists mineral species, their formulas and their crystal systems. He published revised editions in 1975, 1980 and 1983, and then with Joseph A. Mandarino as coauthor in 1991 and 1995. In 1975 Fleischer received the Roebling Medal, the highest honor of the Mineralogical Society of America. In 1976 he received the Bet Medal of the Austrian Mineralogical Society. In 1978 he was awarded the Distinguished Service Medal of the United States Department of the Interior.

== Last years (1978–98) ==
From 1978 to 1995 Fleischer was a research associate at the Smithsonian Institution's Department of Mineral Sciences. Fleischer served as president of the Geological Society of Washington and vice president of the Geological Society of America. In 1992 he became an honorary member of the Russian Academy of Natural Sciences. He was a professorial lecturer at George Washington University from 1957 to 1965. Fleischer developed Alzheimer's disease and spent his last two years at the Hebrew Home of Greater Washington, where he died on 5 September 1998 at the age of 90. The mineral fleischerite is named in his honour.

== Associations ==
Fleischer belonged to a variety of professional organizations, including:

- Mineralogical Society of America (president, 1952)
- Geochemical Society (president, 1964)
- Geological Society of America (vice-president, 1953)
- Geological Society of Washington (president, 1967)
- French Society of Mineralogy and Crystallography^{(fr)} (honorary member, 1969)
- Society for Environmental Geochemistry and Health (vice-president, 1971)
- Mineralogical Society of Great Britain and Ireland (honorary member, 1971)
- German National Academy of Sciences Leopoldina (honorary member)

== Publications ==
Selected publications:

- Michael Fleischer; Judith W. Frondel (1950), Glossary of uranium and thorium bearing minerals, Washington DC
  - Michael Fleischer; Judith W. Frondel; Robert S. Jones (1967), Glossary of uranium and thorium bearing minerals (4 ed.), Washington DC
- Michael Fleischer, ed. (1962–1979), Data of geochemistry, vol. 1–12, Washington DC: US Geological Survey
- Michael Fleischer (1966), "Alphabetical Index of New Mineral Names, Discredited Minerals, and Changes of Mineralogical Nomenclature, Volumes 1-50 (1916-1965)", The American Mineralogist
- Michael Fleischer; Raymond Parker (1968), Geochemistry of Niobium and Tantalum, Washington DC
- Michael Fleischer; Robert Sprague Jones (1969), Gold in minerals and the composition of native gold, Washington DC: US Geological Survey
- Michael Fleischer (1971), Glossary of mineral species (1 ed.), Tucson, Arizona: Mineralogical Records [Based on the 1966 Alphabetical Index of New Mineral Names...]
  - Michael Fleischer; J.A. Mandarino (1995), Fleischer's Glossary of Mineral Species (7 ed.), Tucson, Arizona: Mineralogical Records
- Michael Fleischer (1981), The Ford-Fleischer file of mineralogical references, through 1977, Denver, Colo.: U.S. Dept. of the Interior, Geological Survey
- Michael Fleischer; Ray E. Wilcox; John J. Matzko (1984), Microscopic determination of the non-opaque minerals, Washington, DC: U.S. Dept. of the Interior, Geological Survey
- Michael Fleischer; Sam Rosenblum (1995), The distribution of rare-earth elements in minerals of the family monazite, Washington DC

== Sources ==
- Fleischer, M (1956), "New Mineral Names" (PDF), American Mineralogist, 41: 671
- Mandarino, Joseph A. (1999), "Memorial: Michael Fleischer: 1908-1998", The Mineralogical Record, 30 (1)
- Mason, Dr. Brian (1999), "In Memoriam: Michael Fleischer (1908–1998)", Rocks & Minerals, 74 (2): 126–127, Bibcode:1999RoMin..74..126M, doi:10.1080/00357529909602526
- "Mineral Expert Michael Fleischer Dies at 90", Washington Post, 8 September 1998
- Pabst, Adolf (1981), "Michael Fleischer and the Glossary of Mineral Species 1980", Rocks & Minerals, 56 (4): 156–158, Bibcode:1981RoMin..56..156P, doi:10.1080/00357529.1981.11767306
- Parodi, Gian Carlo (22 January 2009), Michael FLEISCHER (1908-1998) (in French), SFMC: Société Française de Minéralogie et de Cristallographie
- Radyke, Arthur S.; Brown, Gordon E. (1974), "Frankdicksonite, BaFr, a New Mineral from Nevada" (PDF), American Mineralogist, 59
- Willett F. Ramsdell, The University of Michigan
