= Charles T. Prewitt =

American mineralogist and solid state chemist (1933–2022)

Charles Thompson Prewitt
- Born: March 3, 1933; Lexington, Kentucky, USA
- Died: April 28, 2022 (aged 89); Tucson, Arizona, USA
- Education: Massachusetts Institute of Technology
- Scientific career
- Institutions: DuPont; Stony Brook University; Carnegie Institution for Science; University of Arizona
- Thesis: Structures and crystal chemistry of wollastonite and pectolite
- Doctoral advisor: Martin Buerger

Charles Thompson Prewitt (March 3, 1933 – April 28, 2022) was an American mineralogist and solid state chemist known for his work on structural chemistry of minerals and high-pressure chemistry.

== Education and career ==
Prewitt studied geology at Massachusetts Institute of Technology as an undergraduate and received his PhD in 1962 in crystallography at the same place under the supervision of Martin Buerger, where he worked on the structure determination of wollastonites and pectolites. He moved to DuPont Central Research Laboratory in Wilmington, Delaware, where he worked with Robert D. Shannon to compile the effective ionic radii, which became an important foundation of modern crystal chemistry. Afterwards, Prewitt became a professor at Stony Brook University in 1969. In 1986, he was hired by the Carnegie Institute of Science to head the Geophysics Laboratory until 1998. He later became an adjunt faculty member at University of Arizona.

== Honors and awards ==
Prewitt was a Fellow of the Japan Society for the Promotion of Science in 1983. He was the vice president and president of the Mineralogical Society of America in 1983 and 1984, respectively. He was awarded the Roebling Medal from the Mineralogical Society of America in 2003. He received the inaugural Medal for Excellence from the International Mineralogical Association in 2008.

== Bibliography ==
- Prewitt, C. T; Downs, R. T (1998). "High-Pressure Crystal Chemistry". Reviews in Mineralogy. 37: 284–318. ISSN 0275-0279. OCLC 206775409.
- Hazen, Robert M.; Downs, Robert T.; Prewitt, Charles T. (January 1, 2000). "Principles of Comparative Crystal Chemistry1". Reviews in Mineralogy and Geochemistry. 41 (1): 1–33. Bibcode:2000RvMG...41....1H. doi:10.2138/rmg.2000.41.1. ISSN 1529-6466.
- Prewitt, Charles T (2018). Prewitt, Charles T. (ed.). "Pyroxenes". Reviews in Mineralogy. doi:10.1515/9781501508257. ISBN 978-1-5015-0825-7. OCLC 1083579455.
- Heaney, Peter J; Prewitt, Charles T; Gibbs, Gerald V (2019). "Silica: Physical Behavior, Geochemistry, and Materials Applications". Reviews in Mineralogy. Boston: De Gruyter, Inc. ISBN 978-1-5015-0969-8. OCLC 1076804671.
