= Schairer =

Schairer is a German surname primarily from the Baden-Württemberg region. It stems from the German word "Scheuer," or barn, in the Swabian dialect. It also may refer to:

- Erich Schairer, a journalist
- Erich Schairer Prize, an award for journalism
- Eberhard Schairer, a scientist who demonstrated smoking's links to lung cancer in 1943
- George S. Schairer, designer of the Boeing B-52 Stratofortress
- Heinrich Schairer & Co., an electronics corporation
- John Frank Schairer (1904–1970), an American geochemist
