= Clarence S. Ross =

American mineralist and economic geologist (1880–1975)

Clarence Samuel Ross (20 September 1880, Eldora, Iowa – 19 April 1975, Rockville, Maryland) was an American mineralogist, petrologist, and economic geologist. His 1961 paper on ash-flow tuffs, coauthored with Robert Leland Smith (1920–2016), has at least 600 citations.

== Biography ==
Ross received from the University of Illinois his A.B in 1913, A.M. in 1915, and Ph.D. in 1920. He joined the U.S. Geological Survey in 1917. The survey first assigned him the task of mapping oil lands in Osage County, Oklahoma, where he studied bentonitic key horizons. In the summer of 1917 he was sent to the southern Appalachian region to study copper deposits of the Ducktown type. In 1919, with Esper S. Larsen, Jr., he made geologic maps of the southern end of the San Luis Valley in New Mexico. In the early 1920s he published several reports with Hugh D. Miser.

His early studies with Hugh D. Miser were made on the diamond-bearing peridotite in Pike County, Arkansas, and are models of description and interpretation. Subsequently, he published papers on rhyolite and lamprophyric dike rocks. His interest in volcanic pyroclastic rocks began at least as early as 1925, when he published with Earl V. Shannon of the U. S. National Museum a series of papers on bentonite, and culminated in his paper with Robert L. Smith on ash-flow tuffs.

Ross's versatility and broad range of interests are shown by the major topics listed in his bibliography of 121 titles: they covered mineralogy and occurrence of clay minerals, geology of copper deposits of the Southern Appalachians, petrology of rhyolitic welded tuffs, mineralogy and petrology of titanium deposits in Virginia, and comparison of peridotite and pyroxenite with ultramafic nodules in basalts. Ross's contributions to clay mineralogy during more than twenty years in collaboration with P. F. Kerr, S. B. Hendricks, and E. V. Shannon have been fundamental to study of wall-rock alteration related to ore deposits and to understanding of weathering deposits.

Ross was a fellow of the Mineralogical Society of America, the Geological Society of America, and the American Geophysical Union. He was the President of the Mineralogical Society of American in 1935. He received the Roebling Medal in 1946. In 1927 William F. Foshag and Frank Lee Hess (1871–1955) named rossite in his honor. The secondary mineral which results from dehydration of rossite is named metarossite in his honor. Marjorie Hooker compiled a bibliography of Ross's papers.

On 2 November 1918, Ross married Helen Hall Frederick, who died in 1968. Their children were Betsy Ross Jones and Malcolm Ross, who became a geochemist with the U.S. Geological Survey.

== Selected publications ==
- with Hugh Dinsmore Miser and Lloyd William Stephenson: Ross, C. S.; Miser, H. D.; Stephenson, L. W. (1929). Water-laid volcanic rocks of early Upper Cretaceous age in southwestern Arkansas, southeastern Oklahoma, and northeastern Texas. No. 154-F. doi:10.3133/pp154F.
- with Paul Francis Kerr: Ross, C.S.; Kerr, P.F. (1934). "Halloysite and allophane". Professional Paper. US Government Printing Office. doi:10.3133/pp185G. S2CID 126877258.
- Origin of the copper deposits of the Ducktown type in the southern Appalachian region. No. 179-181. US Government Printing Office. 1935.
- Occurrence and origin of the titanium deposits of Nelson and Amherst Counties. US Government Printing Office. 1941.
- with Sterling B. Hendricks: Ross, C. S.; Hendricks, S. B. (1945). Minerals of the montmorillonite group, their origin and relation to soils and clays. No. 205-B. doi:10.3133/pp205B.
- with Roy A. Bailey and Robert L. Smith: Stratigraphic nomenclature of volcanic rocks in the Jemez Mountains, New Mexico (PDF). US Government Printing Office. 1969.
- with Robert L. Smith and Roy A. Bailey: Smith, R. L.; Bailey, R. A.; Ross, C. S. (1970). "Geologic map of the Jemez mountains, New Mexico. No. 571". Imap. doi:10.3133/i571.
