= John W. Gruner =

American mineralogist (1890–1981)

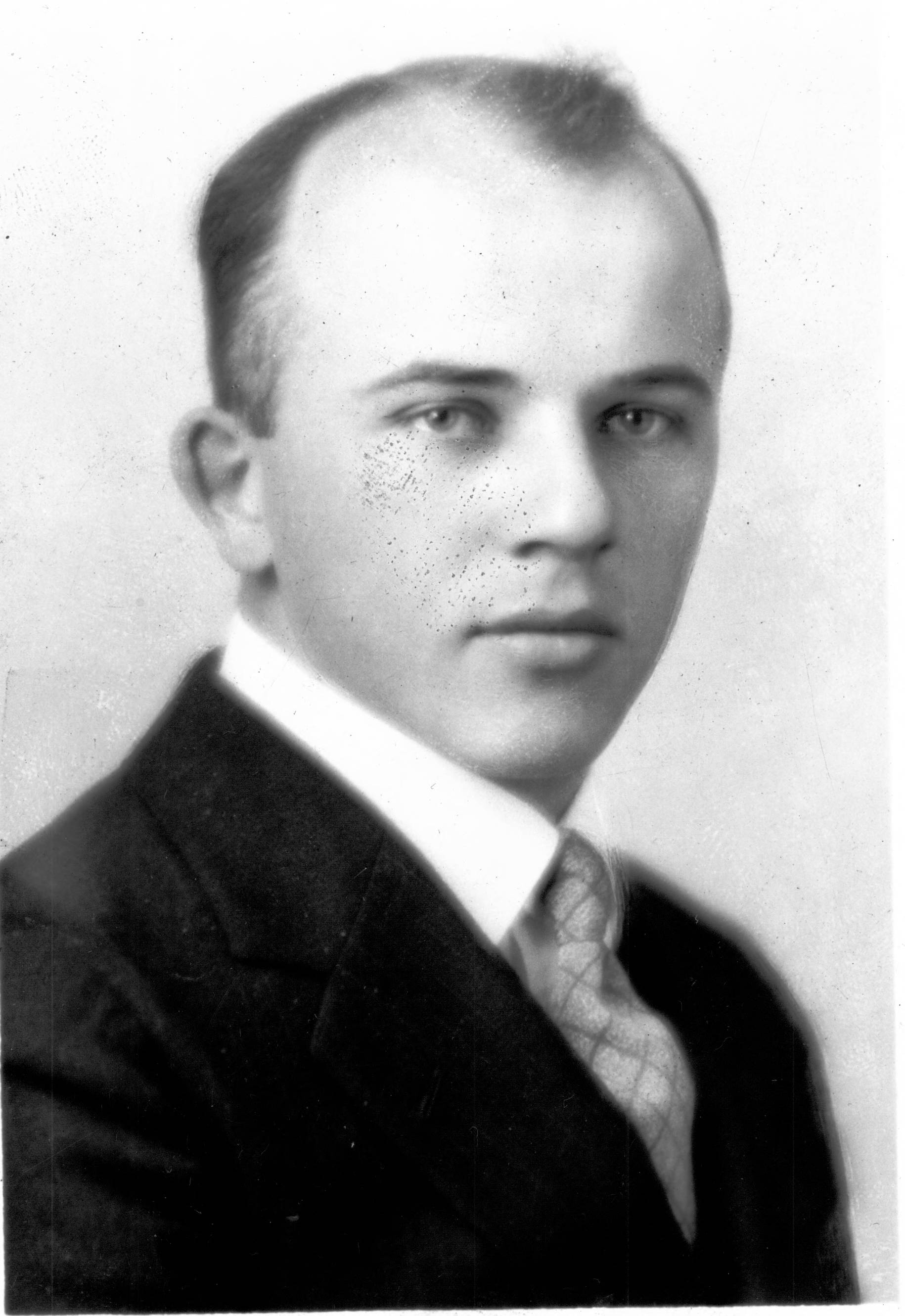
John W. Gruner

John Walter Gruner (12 July 1890, Neurode, now Nowa Ruda – 1981) was a German-born American mineralogist, crystallographer, and geologist. He scientifically described and named two minerals: minnesotaite (1944) and groutite (1945).

== Biography ==
After completing secondary school education, he worked for two years in a wholesale house and saved enough money to emigrate in 1912 from Germany to the U.S.A. Within 12 months after he arrived in New York City, he was hired as a civil engineer to work in Indianapolis for the Big Four Railroad. On vacation trips he visited Colorado and New Mexico and, as a result, developed an interest in geology. At the University of New Mexico, he matriculated in autumn 1915 and graduated with a B.A. in 1917. For the academic year 1917–1918 at the University of Iowa, he studied geology under George Frederick Kay (1873–1943) and took courses in physical and analytical chemistry. In autumn 1918 at the University of Minnesota, he became a graduate student and a research assistant to Walter Harvey Emmons (1876–1948). Gruner studied petrology under Frank Grout and graduated in spring 1919 with an M.S. For the academic year 1919–1920 he held an assistant professorship at Oregon State University and then returned in autumn 1920 to become an instructor and graduate student at the University of Minnesota. There he graduated with a Ph.D. in 1922. In the early 1920s he studied the space groups of Niggli and Wyckoff. At the University of Minnesota, he was an assistant professor from 1923 to 1926, an associate professor from 1926 to 1944, and a full professor from 1944 to 1959, when he retired as professor emeritus. During those years he taught continuously at the University of Minnesota, except for two sabbatical leaves of absence — one for the academic year 1926–1927 and the other for the academic year 1937–1938. In 1926 he went to study X-ray analysis in mineralogy for a year at the University of Leipzig under Friedrich Rinne and Ernst Schiebold. Upon his return from Leipzig, Gruner became one of the U.S.A.'s first mineralogy professors to teach X-ray diffraction methods. He and his students revealed numerous crystal structures of important minerals. Gruner became known as mineralogy's leading expert on Minnesota's iron formations and Colorado's radioactive mineral deposits. Based upon his knowledge of iron ores, he spent the academic year 1937–1938 as a consultant in Germany. During 1943 and 1944, he taught a physics laboratory to U.S. enlisted men. From 1945 to 1953, he worked for the U. S. Signal Corps in the study of quartz crystals. From 1949 to 1958, he held contracts with the Division of Raw Materials of the Atomic Energy Commission (AEC).

His research on iron-bearing chert formations in northern Minnesota led to discoveries of algae fossils from the Precambrian. In the 1950s in his work for the AEC, he did important research on the mineralogy and geology of the uranium deposits of the Colorada Plateau. The focus of much of his scientific work was the determination of the crystallographic structures of phyllosilicates, such as dickite, vermiculite and glauconite, which he examined with an X-ray diffractometer he developed himself. In the 1950s he worked on the origin of uranium deposits and the formation of uranium minerals at low temperatures.

Gruner was, for the academic year 1947–1948, president of the Crystallographic Society of America (predecessor of the American Crystallographic Association formed in 1949) and, for the academic year 1949–1950, president of the Mineralogical Society of America. He received in 1962 the Roebling Medal and in 1963 an honorary doctorate from the University of New Mexico. In 1972 the Geological Society of America published a volume in honor of Gruner.

In 1919 in Minnesota, he married Opal Garrett (1898–1966). They were the parents of three children: Wayne (born 1921), Hazel (born 1924), and Garrett (born 1928).

== Selected publications ==
- Gruner, John W. (1920). "Geologic Reconnaissance of the Southern Part of the Taos Range, New Mexico". The Journal of Geology. 28 (8): 731–742. Bibcode:1920JG.....28..731G. doi:10.1086/622745. S2CID 128465722.
- —— (1922). "The Origin of Sedimentary Iron Formations: The Biwabik Formation of the Mesabi Range". Economic Geology. 17 (6): 407–460. doi:10.2113/gsecongeo.17.6.407.
- —— (1926). "The Soudan Formation and a new suggestion as to the origin of the Vermilion iron ores". Economic Geology. 21 (7): 629–644. Bibcode:1926EcGeo..21..629G. doi:10.2113/gsecongeo.21.7.629.
- —— (1928). "The oscillation method of x-ray analysis of crystals". American Mineralogist. 13: 123–141.
- —— (1929). "Structural reasons for oriented intergrowths in some minerals". American Mineralogist. 14 (6): 227–237.
- —— (1929). "The structure of boracite". American Journal of Science. 5 (101): 453–460. Bibcode:1929AmJS...17..453G. doi:10.2475/ajs.s5-17.101.453.
- —— (1932). "The Crystal Structure of Kaolinite". Zeitschrift für Kristallographie - Crystalline Materials. 83 (1–6): 75–88. doi:10.1524/zkri.1932.83.1.75. S2CID 101635563.
- —— (1934). "The Crystal Structures of Talc and Pyrophyllite". Zeitschrift für Kristallographie - Crystalline Materials. 88 (1–6): 412–419. doi:10.1524/zkri.1934.88.1.412. S2CID 101680970.
- —— (1935). "The structural relationship of glauconite and mica". American Mineralogist. 20 (10): 699–714.
- —— (1937). "Composition and structure of stilpnomelane". American Mineralogist. 22: 912–925.
- ——; Dutton, C. E.; Gibson, G. R.; Grout, F. F. (1941). "Structural geology of the Knife Lake area of northeastern Minnesota". Geological Society of America Bulletin. 52 (10): 1577–1642. Bibcode:1941GSAB...52.1577G. doi:10.1130/GSAB-52-1577.
- —— (1943). "The chemical relationship of cryptomelane (psilomelane), hollandite, and coronadite". American Mineralogist. 28 (9–10): 497–506.
- —— (1944). "The hydrothermal alteration of feldspars in acid solutions between 300° and 400°C". Economic Geology. 39 (8): 578–589. Bibcode:1944EcGeo..39..578G. doi:10.2113/gsecongeo.39.8.578.
- ——; Fetzer, Wallace Gordon; Rapaport, Irving (1951). "The uranium deposits near Marysvale, Piute County, Utah". Economic Geology. 46 (3): 243–251. Bibcode:1951EcGeo..46..243G. doi:10.2113/gsecongeo.46.3.243.
- Rosenzweig, Abraham; ——; Gardiner, Lynn (1954). "Widespread occurrence and character of uraninite in the Triassic and Jurassic sediments of the Colorado Plateau". Economic Geology. 49 (4): 351–361. Bibcode:1954EcGeo..49..351R. doi:10.2113/gsecongeo.49.4.351.
- —— (1954). "The Uranium Mineralogy of the Colorado Plateau and Adjacent Regions". Uranium Deposits and General Geology of Southeastern Utah; Guidebook to the Geology of Utah. 9. Utah Geological Society: 70–77.
- —— (1956). "Concentration of uranium in sediments by multiple migration-accretion". Economic Geology. 51 (6): 495–520. Bibcode:1956EcGeo..51..495G. doi:10.2113/gsecongeo.51.6.495.
- Cloud, Preston E.; ——; Hagen, Hannelore (1965). "Carbonaceous Rocks of the Soudan Iron Formation (Early Precambrian)". Science. 148 (3678): 1713–1716. Bibcode:1965Sci...148.1713C. doi:10.1126/science.148.3678.1713. PMID 17819418. S2CID 33717048.
