= Roebling Medal =

Award of the Mineralogical Society of America

The Roebling Medal is the highest award of the Mineralogical Society of America for scientific eminence as represented primarily by scientific publication of outstanding original research in mineralogy. The award is named for Colonel Washington A. Roebling (1837–1926) who was an engineer, bridge builder, mineral collector, and significant friend of the Mineralogical Society of America. It is awarded for scientific eminence represented by scientific publication of outstanding original research in mineralogy. The recipient receives an engraved medal and is made a Life Fellow of the Mineralogical Society.

== Roebling Medal Recipients ==
The recipients of the medal are:

- 1937 – Charles Palache
- 1938 – Waldemar T. Schaller
- 1940 – Leonard James Spencer
- 1941 – Esper S. Larsen Jr.
- 1945 – Edward Henry Kraus
- 1946 – Clarence S. Ross
- 1947 – Paul Niggli
- 1948 – William Lawrence Bragg
- 1949 – Herbert E. Merwin
- 1950 – Norman L. Bowen
- 1952 – Frederick E. Wright
- 1953 – William F. Foshag
- 1954 – Cecil Edgar Tilley
- 1955 – Alexander N. Winchell
- 1956 – Arthur F. Buddington
- 1957 – Walter F. Hunt
- 1958 – Martin J. Buerger
- 1959 – Felix Machatschki
- 1960 – Tom F. W. Barth
- 1961 – Paul Ramdohr
- 1962 – John W. Gruner
- 1963 – John Frank Schairer
- 1964 – Clifford Frondel
- 1965 – Adolf Pabst
- 1966 – Max H. Hey
- 1967 – Linus Pauling
- 1968 – Tei-ichi Ito
- 1969 – Fritz Laves
- 1970 – George W. Brindley
- 1971 – J. D. H. Donnay
- 1972 – Elburt F. Osborn
- 1973 – George Tunell
- 1974 – Ralph E. Grim
- 1975 – Michael Fleischer
- 1975 – O. Frank Tuttle
- 1976 – Carl W. Correns
- 1977 – Raimond Castaing
- 1978 – James B. Thompson Jr.
- 1979 – W. H. Taylor
- 1980 – Dmitrii S. Korzhinskii
- 1981 – Robert M. Garrels
- 1982 – Joseph V. Smith
- 1983 – Hans P. Eugster
- 1984 – Paul B. Barton Jr.
- 1985 – Francis John Turner
- 1986 – Edwin Roedder
- 1987 – Gerald V. Gibbs
- 1988 – Julian R. Goldsmith
- 1989 – Helen D. Megaw
- 1990 – Sturges W. Bailey
- 1991 – E-An Zen
- 1992 – Hatten S. Yoder Jr.
- 1993 – Brian Harold Mason
- 1994 – William A. Bassett
- 1995 – William S. Fyfe
- 1996 – Donald H. Lindsley
- 1997 – Ian S. E. Carmichael
- 1998 – C. Wayne Burnham
- 1999 – Ikuo Kushiro
- 2000 – Robert C. Reynolds Jr.
- 2001 – Peter J. Wyllie
- 2002 – Werner F. Schreyer
- 2003 – Charles T. Prewitt
- 2004 – Francis R. Boyd
- 2005 – Ho-kwang Mao
- 2006 – W. Gary Ernst
- 2007 – Gordon E. Brown Jr.
- 2008 – Bernard W. Evans
- 2009 – Alexandra Navrotsky
- 2010 – Robert C. Newton
- 2011 – Juhn G. Liou
- 2012 – Harry W. Green, II
- 2013 – Frank C. Hawthorne
- 2014 – Bernard J. Wood
- 2015 – Rodney C. Ewing
- 2016 – Robert M. Hazen
- 2017 - Edward M. Stolper
- 2018 – E. Bruce Watson
- 2019 – Peter R. Buseck
- 2020 – Andrew Putnis
- 2021 – George R. Rossman
- 2022 – John W. Valley
- 2023 – Georges Calas
- 2024 – Nancy L. Ross
- 2025 – Melinda Darby Dyar

== See also ==
- List of geology awards
- Ewald Prize
