= Arthur L. Day Medal =

The Arthur L. Day Medal is a prize awarded by the Geological Society of America, established in 1948 by Arthur Louis Day for "outstanding distinction in contributing to geologic knowledge through the application of physics and chemistry to the solution of geologic problems".

== List of winners ==
Source: Geological Society of America

- 2025 Hailiang Dong
- 2024 Janice L. Bishop
- 2023 Isabel P. Montañez
- 2022 Timothy W. Lyons
- 2021 Katherine H. Freeman
- 2020 Ariel D. Anbar
- 2019 John W. Valley
- 2018 Jay Quade
- 2017 Neal R. Iverson
- 2016 Donald B. Dingwell
- 2015 Jerry X. Mitrovica
- 2014 Lisa Tauxe
- 2013 Richard W. Carlson
- 2012 John M. Eiler
- 2011 Susan L. Brantley
- 2010 George E. Gehrels
- 2009 T. Mark Harrison
- 2008 Kenneth A. Farley
- 2007 Mary Lou Zoback
- 2006 Frank M. Richter
- 2005 Donald W. Forsyth
- 2004 Edward M. Stolper
- 2003 Dennis V. Kent
- 2002 Richard G. Gordon
- 2001 Richard J. O'Connell
- 2000 Robert Stephen John Sparks
- 1999 Donald J. DePaolo
- 1998 E. Bruce Watson
- 1997 Edward A. Irving
- 1996 Robert A. Berner
- 1995 Thomas J. Ahrens
- 1994 David Walker
- 1993 Hugh P. Taylor, Jr.
- 1992 Susan Werner Kieffer
- 1991 Ian S. E. Carmichael
- 1990 William S. Fyfe
- 1989 Dan McKenzie
- 1988 Claude J. Allègre
- 1987 Don L. Anderson
- 1986 E-An Zen
- 1985 Freeman Gilbert
- 1984 Wallace S. Broecker
- 1983 Harmon Craig
- 1982 Eugene M. Shoemaker
- 1981 Donald L. Turcotte
- 1980 Henry G. Thode
- 1979 Walter M. Elsasser
- 1978 Samuel Epstein
- 1977 Akiho Miyashiro
- 1976 Hans Ramberg
- 1975 Allan V. Cox
- 1974 A. E. Ringwood
- 1973 David T. Griggs
- 1972 Frank Press
- 1971 Hans P. Eugster
- 1970 Gerald J. Wasserburg
- 1969 Harold C. Urey
- 1968 Frederick J. Vine
- 1967 O. Frank Tuttle
- 1966 Robert M. Garrels
- 1965 Walter H. Munk
- 1964 James Burleigh Thompson, Jr.
- 1963 Keith Edward Bullen
- 1962 Hatten Schuyler Yoder
- 1961 Willard F. Libby
- 1960 Konrad B. Krauskopf
- 1959 Sir Edward C. Bullard
- 1958 John Verhoogen
- 1957 Hugo Benioff
- 1956 Alfred O.C. Nier
- 1955 Earl Ingerson
- 1954 Marion King Hubbert
- 1953 John Frank Schairer
- 1952 Sterling Hendricks
- 1951 Martin J. Buerger
- 1950 Francis Birch
- 1949 William Maurice Ewing
- 1948 George W. Morey

== See also ==
- List of geology awards
- Prizes named after people
