= James B. Thompson Jr. =

American mineralogist

James Burleigh Thompson Jr. (November 20, 1921 – November 15, 2011) was an American mineralogist and geologist. He was known for his research into the thermodynamics of minerals and the relationship to structure. He introduced the term polysomatic series for describing layered structures with chemically distinct layers.

== Education and career ==
Thompson studied geology at Dartmouth College, graduating with an AB in 1942. From 1942 to 1946, he worked in the United States Army Air Forces as a weather forecaster. He started graduate school afterwards, studying in geology at Massachusetts Institute of Technology and graduated with a PhD in 1950.

Thompson was hired at Harvard University as an instructor in petrology in 1949 as a successor of Esper Signius Larsen. He was promoted to assistant professor in the following year to full professorship in 1960. Thompson was named Sturgis Hooper Professor of Geology at Harvard in 1977.

== Honors and awards ==
Thompson was elected a member of the American Academy of Arts and Sciences in 1958, and a member of the National Academy of Sciences in 1967. He was awarded the Arthur L. Day Medal of the Geological Society of America in 1964, the Roebling Medal from the Mineralogical Society of America in 1978, and the V. M. Goldschmidt Award of the Geochemical Society in 1985.
