= Esper Signius Larsen =

American geologist and petrologist (1879–1961)

Esper Signius Larsen, Jr.
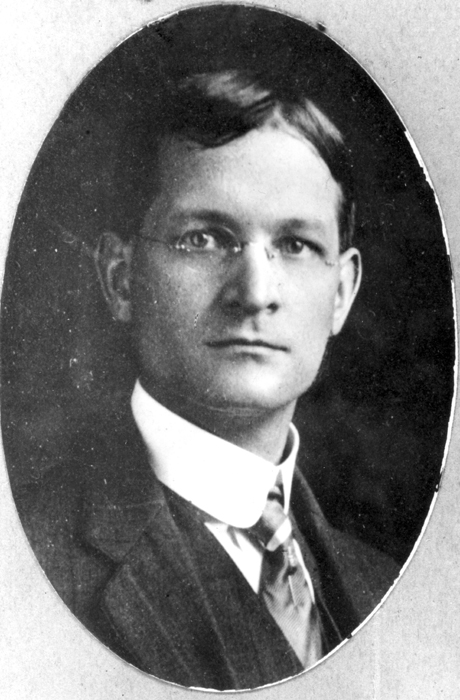
- Esper Signius Larsen, Jr. circa 1908
- Born: March 14, 1879; Astoria, Oregon, USA
- Died: March 8, 1961 (aged 81); Berkeley, California, USA
- Education: University of California, Berkeley
- Scientific career
- Institutions: Carnegie Institution; US Geological Survey; Harvard University
- Thesis: Areal Geology of the Creede Mining District, Colorado (1918)
- Academic advisors: Charles Whitman Cross; Frederick Eugene Wright; Walter Curran Mendenhall
- Notable students: William Thomas Pecora

Esper Signius Larsen, Jr. (14 March 1879 – 8 March 1961) was an American geologist and petrologist who contributed to techniques for age estimation using the lead-uranium ratio or Larsen method and the petrological study of non-opaque minerals using optical microscopy techniques. He served as a professor of petrology at Harvard University from 1923 to 1949. The mineral Esperite (earlier called Calcium Larsenite) was named after him.

== Education and career ==
Larsen was born in Astoria, Oregon to Danish immigrant Esper Signius Sr. and Louisa Pauly from Akron. His father ran grocery stores and moved to Portland where young Larsen went to study at Portland Public Schools. He then worked for a while before joining the University of California in 1902 where he studied under Andrew Cowper Lawson and Arthur Starr Eakle. After studying mathematics and chemistry he graduated in 1906 and taught for a while. He then moved to work in geology at the Carnegie Institution in Washington under Frederick Eugene Wright and Herbert E. Merwin. Later, Larsen returned to Berkeley and received a doctorate in 1918 with a thesis on the "Areal Geology of the Creede Mining District, Colorado." In 1909 he joined US Geological Survey under Charles Whitman Cross, their studies on the volcanic San Juan Mountains was published in 1956. Larsen was promoted from assistant geologist to geologist in 1914 and worked there until 1923 when he joined Harvard University as a professor of petrology. He taught in Harvard until 1949 and went back to work with the USGS but stopped due to poor health in 1958.

== Research ==
Larsen's major work was an analysis and tabulation of the optical characteristics of 600 minerals using liquid immersion within a hollowed prism. The results were published in 1921 and revised with Harry Berman in 1934. The Microscopic Determination of the Nonopaque Minerals (1934) was a major landmark in mineralogy. After his retirement in 1949 he focussed on the development of the aging technique based on Lead, Uranium and Thorium ratios in zircon. The mineral Esperite was named after him (it was originally described as Calcium Larsenite and renamed in 1965).

== Personal life ==
In 1910, Larsen married Eva Audrey Smith, daughter of Sylvester C. Smith. One of Larsen's sons was also a petrologist Esper S. Larsen III who also died in 1961.
