= Adolf Pabst =

American mineralogist and geologist

- Born: 30 November 1899; Chicago, Illinois
- Died: 3 April 1990 (aged 91); Berkeley, California
- Education: University of Illinois; University of California, Berkeley (Ph.D.)
- Scientific career
- Fields: mineralogy; geology
- Workplaces: University of California, Berkeley

Adolf Pabst (30 November 1899, Chicago – 3 April 1990, Berkeley, California) was an American mineralogist and geologist.

== Biography ==
Pabst received in 1925 his bachelor's degree at the University of Illinois and in 1928 his Ph.D. in geology and mineralogy at the University of California, Berkeley under George D. Louderbeck with a thesis on mineral inclusions in the granitic plutons of the Sierra Nevada. For the academic year 1928/29 he won an American-Scandinavian Foundation fellowship for postdoctoral study; on this postdoc under Victor Moritz Goldschmidt in Oslo, Pabst married Gudrun Lisabeth Bert. After returning to Berkeley, he became in 1929 an instructor, in 1931 an assistant professor, in 1936 an associate professor, and in 1944 a full professor. In the academic year 1938/39 he was a Guggenheim Fellow at the Natural History Museum in London and in the academic year 1955/56 a Fulbright Fellow at the University of Vienna. In 1967 he retired as professor emeritus, but continued to do research at U. C. Berkeley and published steadily until 1984. He was in the academic year 1967/68 a visiting professor of mineralogy und crystallography at the University of Nevada, Reno and in the academic year 1968/69 a visiting professor of mineralogy at the University of Oregon. He was also in the academic year 1970/71 a Fulbright Visiting Professor at the University of Berlin and the University of Kiel.

Pabst was for many years on the editorial board of American Mineralogist. He first described various minerals, among which are huttonite and macdonaldite.

== Awards and honors ==
Pabst was in 1951 President of the Mineralogical Society of America, in 1980 President of the International Mineralogical Association, and in the two years 1948 and 1949 President of the Crystallographic Society of America. He was elected a member of the Mineralogical Society of London and in 1967 a Fellow der California Academy of Sciences. In 1971 he was made an honorary member of the German Mineralogical Society.

He received in 1965 the Roebling Medal and in 1974 the Austrian Mineralogical Society's Friedrich Becke Medal.

The mineral pabstite is named in his honor.
