= Juhn G. Liou =

Taiwanese geologist

Juhn Guang Liou is a Taiwanese geologist.

Liou attended Hsinchu Senior High School and National Taiwan University, where he worked as a research assistant to Academia Sinica member V. C. Juan alongside high school classmate Bor-ming Jahn. Liou earned a doctorate from the University of California, Los Angeles, and joined the Stanford University faculty in 1972. In 1978, Liou was named a fellow of the Mineralogical Society of America and awarded a Guggenheim Fellowship. The Geological Society of America granted Liou fellowship in 1979. He retired from Stanford in 2005, and was awarded the Roebling Medal in 2011.
