= Mary Helen Wright Greuter =

American astronomer and historian

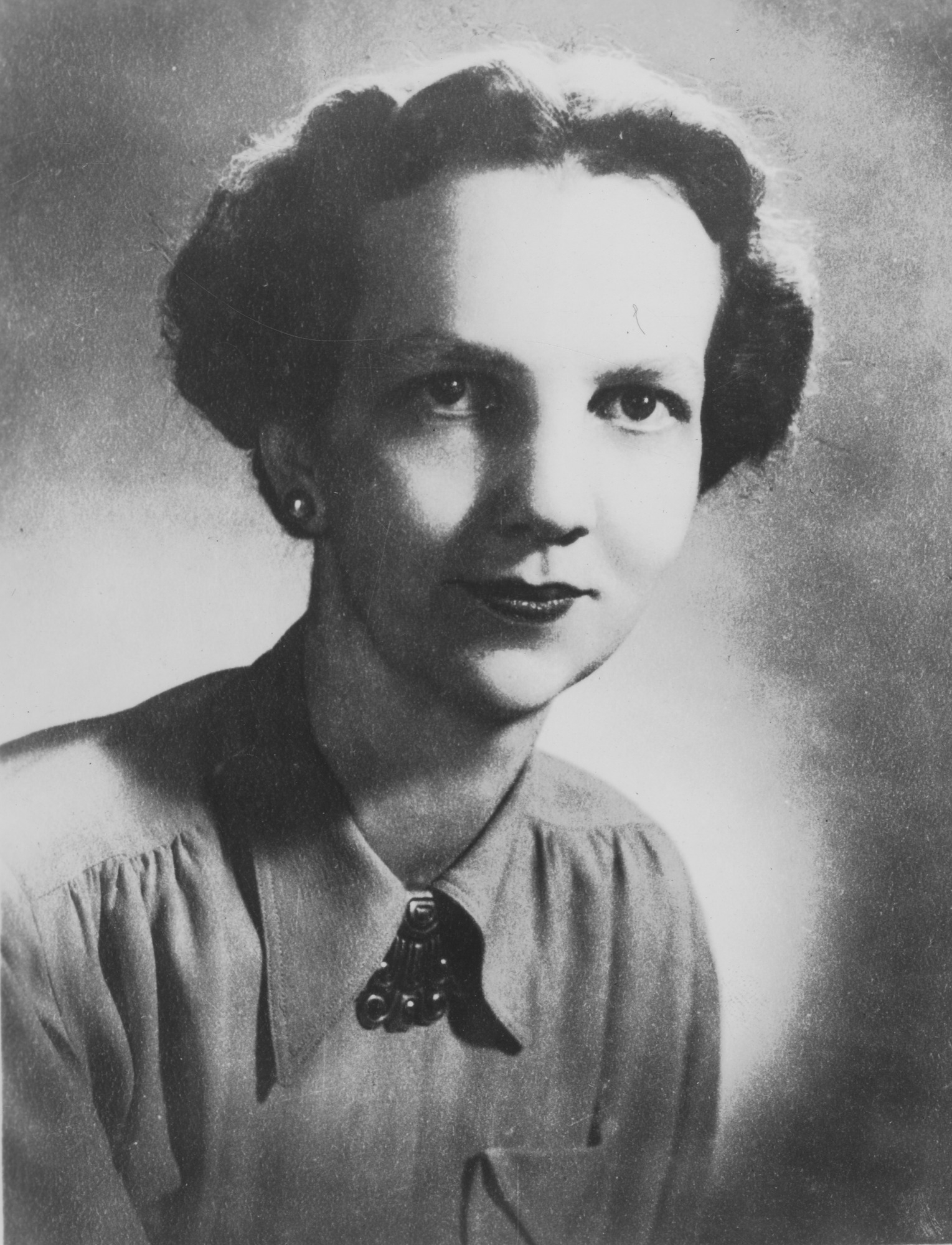
- Mary Helen Wright Greuter
- Born: December 20, 1914; Washington, D.C., US
- Died: October 23, 1997 (aged 82); Washington, D.C., US
- Education: Madeira School
- Alma mater: Bennett Junior College
- Spouse: John Franklin Hawkins
- Scientific career
- Fields: Astronomy and history
- Institutions: Mount Wilson Observatory

Mary Helen Wright Greuter (December 20, 1914 – October 23, 1997) was an American astronomer and historian, who wrote and edited on the history and methodology of sciences, including anthropology, archeology, mathematics, and physics.

== Early years ==
Born in Washington, D.C., she was the daughter of the geophysicist Frederick Eugene Wright and Kathleen Ethel Finley. She was known professionally by her family name of Wright. Her siblings included, William F. Wright and Kenneth A. Wright. Wright was educated at Madeira School. She was a Bennett Junior College graduate (1934), and Vassar College graduate (Bachelor's, 1937; Master's in Astronomy, 1939).

== Career ==
Through her father, who led the Carnegie Institution for Science Moon Project at the Mount Wilson Observatory, Wright became acquainted with people at Mt. Wilson, and got a job as an assistant (1937) doing research on the history of telescopes; and in the same year, worked as an assistant at the Vassar College Observatory. She also worked as a Junior Assistant at the U.S. Naval Observatory in Washington, D.C. (1942–43); and was associated with Palomar Observatory. In 1943, she became a freelance author and editor. Her best known works include, Explorer of the Universe: A Biography of George Ellery Hale (1966) and Sweeper of the Sky: The Life of Maria Mitchell (1949). Wright was a member of the American Astronomical Society, the History of Science Society, and the International Astronomical Union. She was elected as a Fellow of the American Association for the Advancement of Science in 1961.

== Personal life ==
She married and later divorced the artist John Franklin Hawkins, and then married Rene Greuter in 1967, but remained childless. She summered on Sagastaweka Island, and maintained homes in Washington, New Jersey, and Nantucket. Wright's other interests included stone carving. Wright died of a heart attack in 1997 in Washington, D.C.
