= Martin Julian Buerger =

American crystallographer (1903–1986)

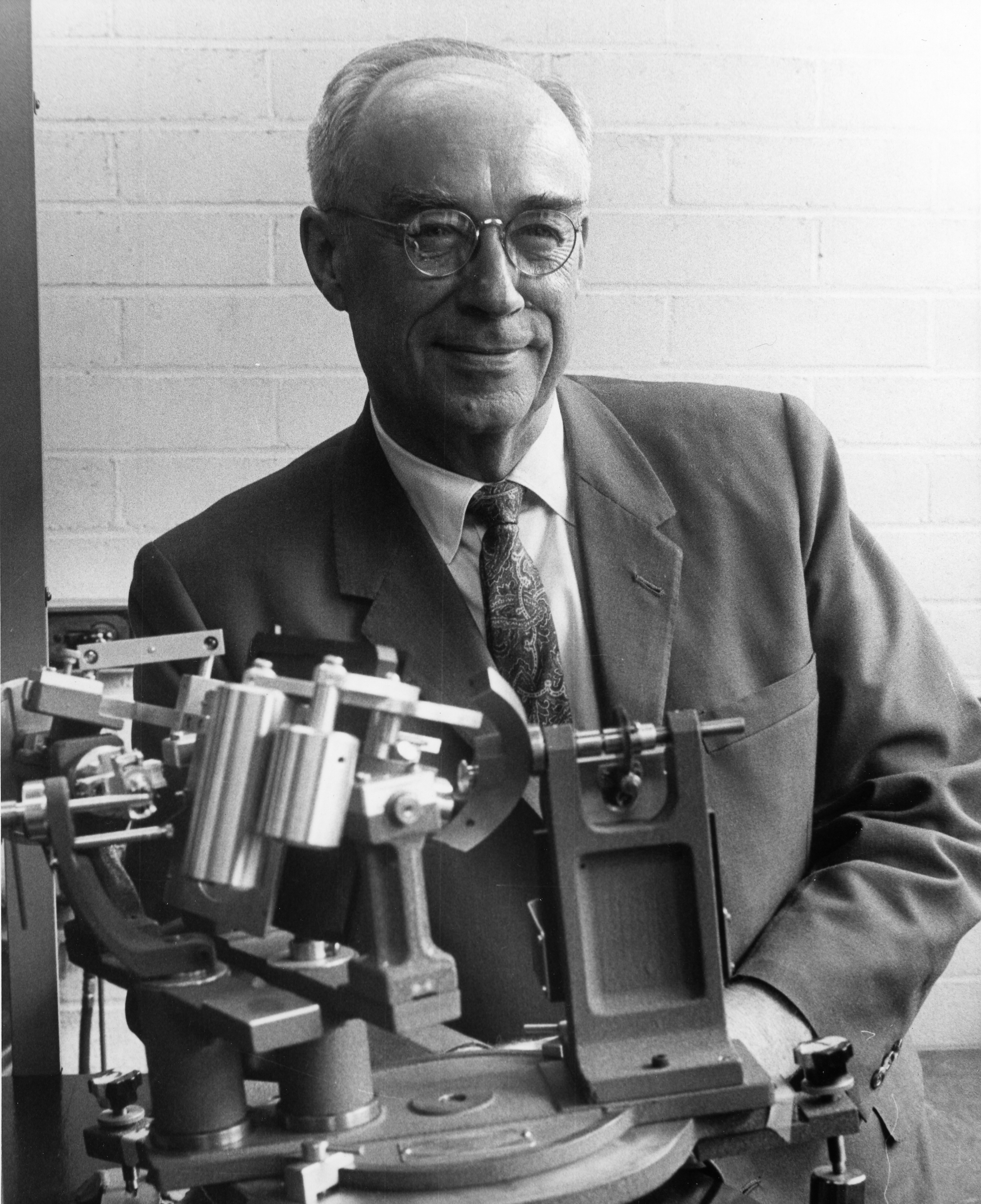
- Martin Julian Buerger
- Born: April 8, 1903; Detroit, Michigan, U.S.
- Died: February 26, 1986 (aged 82); Lincoln, Massachusetts
- Education: Massachusetts Institute of Technology
- Awards: Arthur L. Day Medal - 1951, Roebling Medal - 1958, Honorary Doctorate from the University of Bern, Switzerland, Member of the U.S. National Academy of Sciences
- Scientific career
- Fields: Crystallographer
- Workplaces: Massachusetts Institute of Technology; University of Connecticut
- Doctoral advisor: Waldemar Lindgren
- Doctoral students: Charles T. Prewitt

Martin Julian Buerger (April 8, 1903 – February 26, 1986) was an American crystallographer. He was a Professor of Mineralogy at the Massachusetts Institute of Technology. He invented the X-ray precession camera for studies in crystallography. Buerger authored twelve textbooks/monographs and over 200 technical articles. He was awarded the Arthur L. Day Medal by the Geological Society of America in 1951. The mineral fluor-buergerite was named for him. The MJ Buerger Award (established by the American Crystallographic Association) was established in his honor.

Buerger was a member of the Provisional International Crystallographic Committee chaired by P. P. Ewald from 1946 to 1948, and he continued as a member of the IUCr Executive Committee from 1948 to 1951. He was also a member of the Commission on International Tables from its establishment in 1948 until 1981.

In 1956, Buerger was the third person (after John C. Slater and Francis O. Schmitt) to have been appointed Institute Professor at MIT.

== Significant works ==
- Buerger MJ (July 1934). "The Temperature-Structure-Composition Behavior of Certain Crystals". Proceedings of the National Academy of Sciences of the United States of America. 20 (7): 444–53. doi:10.1073/pnas.20.7.444. PMC 1076442. PMID 16577615.
- Buerger MJ (December 1936). "The Kinetic Basis of Crystal Polymorphism". Proceedings of the National Academy of Sciences of the United States of America. 22 (12): 682–5. doi:10.1073/pnas.22.12.682. PMC 1076843. PMID 16577751.
- Buerger MJ (December 1936). "The General Rôle of Composition in Polymorphism". Proceedings of the National Academy of Sciences of the United States of America. 22 (12): 685–9. doi:10.1073/pnas.22.12.685. PMC 1076844. PMID 16577752.
- Buerger MJ (July 1939). "The Photography of Interatomic Distance Vectors and of Crystal Patterns". Proceedings of the National Academy of Sciences of the United States of America. 25 (7): 383–8. doi:10.1073/pnas.25.7.383. PMC 1077926. PMID 16577920.
- Buerger MJ (November 1940). "The Correction of X-Ray Diffraction Intensities for Lorentz and Polarization Factors". Proceedings of the National Academy of Sciences of the United States of America. 26 (11): 637–42. doi:10.1073/pnas.26.11.637. PMC 1078244. PMID 16577987.
- Buerger MJ (February 1941). "Optically Reciprocal Gratings and Their Application to Synthesis of Fourier Series". Proceedings of the National Academy of Sciences of the United States of America. 27 (2): 117–24. doi:10.1073/pnas.27.2.117. PMC 1078286. PMID 16577998.
- Buerger MJ (July 1942). "A New Fourier Series Technique for Crystal Structure Determination". Proceedings of the National Academy of Sciences of the United States of America. 28 (7): 281–5. doi:10.1073/pnas.28.7.281. PMC 1078468. PMID 16578051.
- Buerger MJ, Smith LB, de Bretteville A, Ryer FV (December 1942). "The Lower Hydrates of Soap". Proceedings of the National Academy of Sciences of the United States of America. 28 (12): 526–9. doi:10.1073/pnas.28.12.526. PMC 1078532. PMID 16588581.
- Buerger MJ (December 1942). "The Characteristics of Soap Hemihydrate Crystals". Proceedings of the National Academy of Sciences of the United States of America. 28 (12): 529–35. doi:10.1073/pnas.28.12.529. PMC 1078533. PMID 16588582.
- Buerger MJ, Smith LB, Ryer FV, Spike JE (August 1945). "The Crystalline Phases of Soap". Proceedings of the National Academy of Sciences of the United States of America. 31 (8): 226–33. doi:10.1073/pnas.31.8.226. PMC 1078808. PMID 16588693.
- Buerger MJ (June 1948). "Some Relations Between the F's and F2's of X-Ray Diffraction". Proceedings of the National Academy of Sciences of the United States of America. 34 (6): 277–85. doi:10.1073/pnas.34.6.277. PMC 1079109. PMID 16588811.
- Buerger MJ (April 1949). "Crystallographic Symmetry in Reciprocal Space". Proceedings of the National Academy of Sciences of the United States of America. 35 (4): 198–201. doi:10.1073/pnas.35.4.198. PMC 1062998. PMID 16588883.
- Buerger MJ (May 1950). "The Crystallographic Symmetries Determinable by X-Ray Diffraction". Proceedings of the National Academy of Sciences of the United States of America. 36 (5): 324–9. doi:10.1073/pnas.36.5.324. PMC 1063191. PMID 15417548.
- Buerger MJ (May 1950). "The Photography of Atoms in Crystals". Proceedings of the National Academy of Sciences of the United States of America. 36 (5): 330–5. doi:10.1073/pnas.36.5.330. PMC 1063192. PMID 15417549.
- Buerger MJ (July 1950). "Some New Functions of Interest in X-Ray Crystallography". Proceedings of the National Academy of Sciences of the United States of America. 36 (7): 376–82. doi:10.1073/pnas.36.7.376. PMC 1063208. PMID 15430317.
- Buerger MJ (December 1950). "Limitation of Electron Density by the Patterson Function". Proceedings of the National Academy of Sciences of the United States of America. 36 (12): 738–42. doi:10.1073/pnas.36.12.738. PMC 1063280. PMID 16578351.
- Buerger MJ (July 1953). "Image Theory of Superposed Vector Sets". Proceedings of the National Academy of Sciences of the United States of America. 39 (7): 669–73. doi:10.1073/pnas.39.7.669. PMC 1063842. PMID 16589322.
- Buerger MJ (July 1953). "Solution Functions for Solving Superposed Patterson Syntheses". Proceedings of the National Academy of Sciences of the United States of America. 39 (7): 674–8. doi:10.1073/pnas.39.7.674. PMC 1063843. PMID 16589323.
- Buerger MJ (July 1953). "An Intersection Function and Its Relations to the Minimum Function of X-Ray Crystallography". Proceedings of the National Academy of Sciences of the United States of America. 39 (7): 678–80. doi:10.1073/pnas.39.7.678. PMC 1063844. PMID 16589324.
- Buerger MJ (February 1954). "Some Relations for Crystals with Substructures". Proceedings of the National Academy of Sciences of the United States of America. 40 (2): 125–8. doi:10.1073/pnas.40.2.125. PMC 527953. PMID 16589430.
- Buerger MJ, Robinson DW (April 1955). "THE CRYSTAL STRUCTURE AND TWINNING OF Co2S3". Proceedings of the National Academy of Sciences of the United States of America. 41 (4): 199–203. doi:10.1073/pnas.41.4.199. PMC 528056. PMID 16589645.
- Buerger MJ (March 1956). "The Arrangement of Atoms in Crystals of the Wollastonite Group of Metasilicates". Proceedings of the National Academy of Sciences of the United States of America. 42 (3): 113–6. doi:10.1073/pnas.42.3.113. PMC 528228. PMID 16589830.
- Buerger MJ (October 1956). "Partial Fourier Syntheses and Their Application to the Solution of Certain Crystal Structures". Proceedings of the National Academy of Sciences of the United States of America. 42 (10): 776–81. doi:10.1073/pnas.42.10.776. PMC 528335. PMID 16589951.
- Takeuchi Y, Buerger MJ (October 1960). "The Crystal Structure of Terramycin Hydrochloride". Proceedings of the National Academy of Sciences of the United States of America. 46 (10): 1366–70. doi:10.1073/pnas.46.10.1366. PMC 223052. PMID 16590759.
- Crystal-Structure Analysis, 668pp, Krieger Pub Co., 1979
- Introduction to crystal geometry, 204pp., R. E. Krieger, 1977
- Contemporary crystallography, 364pp., McGraw Hill, 1970
- Elementary crystallography;: An introduction to the fundamental geometrical features of crystals, 528pp., Wiley, 1963
- X-ray crystallography;: An introduction to the investigation of crystals by their diffraction of monochromatic X radiation, 531pp., Chapman & Hall, 1958
- Buerger, M J (1944). The photography of the reciprocal lattice. Cambridge, Massachusetts: ASXRED. OCLC 180582947.
