= Frankdicksonite =

Halide mineral

General
- Category: Halide mineral
- Formula: BaF_{2}
- IMA symbol: Fds
- Strunz classification: 3.AB.25
- Crystal system: Isometric
- Crystal class: Hexoctahedral (m3̅m); H-M symbol: (4/m 3̅ 2/m)
- Space group: Fm3̅m (No. 225)

Identification
- Formula mass: 175.32 g/mol
- Color: Colorless
- Crystal habit: Prismatic tabular striated parallel to [001]
- Cleavage: {111} perfect
- Mohs scale hardness: 2.5
- Luster: Vitreous
- Streak: White
- Diaphaneity: Transparent
- Specific gravity: 4.89
- Optical properties: Isotropic
- Refractive index: n = 1.475
- Other characteristics: Not radioactive

Frankdicksonite is a halide mineral with the chemical formula BaF_{2} which corresponds to the chemical compound barium fluoride. It occurs in the Carlin gold deposit of Eureka County, Nevada as cubic crystals sized between 0.1 and 4 mm, and is of hydrothermal origin. Its only associated mineral is quartz and the frankdicksonite crystals are always completely encapsulated in it. Frankdicksonite has fluorite crystal structure with a cubic symmetry and the lattice constant a = 619.64 pm. Its Vickers hardness on the {111} cleavage crystal faces varies between 88 and 94 kg/mm^{2} and is close to that of the synthetic barium fluoride (95 kg/mm^{2}). Its refractive index (1.475) is almost identical to that of BaF_{2} (1.474). Under electron irradiation, it emits strong blue cathodoluminescence. The major impurity in frankdicksonite is strontium with concentrations up to 0.5% by weight. Also present are silicon (0.02%) and magnesium (0.0015%); other impurities have concentrations below 0.0015%.

Although synthetic barium fluoride has been commonly known from at least 1846, it had not been found in nature. The natural existence of barium fluoride was predicted by Michael Fleischer in 1970. Later in the same year, the mineral was discovered by Arthur S. Radtke and named after Frank W. Dickson (born 1922), professor of Geochemistry at Stanford University in recognition of his contributions to geology and geochemistry of low-temperature ore deposits. Frankdicksonite was officially recognized by the Commission of New Minerals and Mineral Names in 1974.
