= Frank Fitch Grout =

American petrographer, geologist

Frank Fitch Grout (January 24, 1880, Rockford, Illinois – August 1, 1958, Minneapolis) was an American petrographer, geologist, and mineralogist. He is perhaps best known for introducing the term lopolith into the science of geology. The mineral groutite is named in Grout's honor (based upon a 1945 discovery by John Walter Gruner).

== Biography ==
Grout graduated from the high school course offered at Throop Polytechnic Institute and Manual Training School and then briefly studied at Throop College (precursor to Caltech), before transferring to the University of Minnesota. There he graduated with a bachelor's degree in chemistry in 1904. He was employed in 1905 by the West Virginia Geological Survey and in 1906 by the Illinois Geological Survey. He was briefly employed as an instructor by the University of Oklahoma. At the University of Minnesota, he joined in 1907 the academic staff of the geology department and retained academic appointments there until his retirement. He was promoted to full professor in 1919 and retired in 1948 as professor emeritus. He received in 1908 a master's degree in geology from the University of Minnesota and in 1917 a Ph.D. in geology from Yale University. His Ph.D. thesis deals with pegmatites of the Duluth gabbro. In December 1947 he gave an address to a conference sponsored by the Geological Society of America. Grout gained an outstanding reputation as a teacher. In retirement, he taught successively at several universities: Florida State}, Columbia, Arizona, and Caltech.

For about 35 years from 1919 to 1944, Grout spent most of his summers doing supervisory fieldwork for the Minnesota Geological Survey. This supervisory role was delegated to him by William Harvey Emmons (1876–1948). (Emmons was from 1911 to 1944 the head of the University of Minnesota's geology and, simultaneously, the director of the Minnesota Geological Survey.) Grout was extremely productive during these summers and completed, with his junior colleagues, many valuable reports. Grout enjoyed this summer fieldwork in the lake country of Minnesota and adjacent area in Ontario. In the lake country, he and his colleagues travelled by canoe and portage and camped in rarely visited areas. When he died his ashes were scattered on Saganaga Lake, on whose shores he had done geological research.

Grout was primarily a petrologist and petrographer, but he also did research on "clays, coal, iron formation and ores, mineralogy, chemical analysis of rocks and Precambrian stratigraphy." He was particularly interested in the geology of the Duluth Complex. Concerning the Duluth Complex, there was a controversy between Norman L. Bowen, on one side, and R. A. Daly and F. F. Grout, on the other side, about the role of differentiation processes in magmas. The Duluth Complex consists of two layers, a thicker lower layer essentially gabbro and an upper red layer that more closely resembles granite (called granophyre). There is no major transition in between, as would have been expected under Bowen's theory of differentiation/crystallization. Grout pointed out evidence of convection in the magma.

In July 1906 in Minneapolis, Frank F. Grout married May W. Browne. Upon his death in 1958, he was survived by his widow, their daughter, and four grandchildren.

== Selected publications ==
- Grout, Frank Fitch; Soper, Edgar Kirke (1914). Preliminary Report on the Clays and Shales of Minnesota.
- Grout, Frank Fitch (1919). Clays and Shales of Minnesota. LCCN gs19000333.
- Grout, Frank Fitch; Schwartz, George Melvin; Knapp, George N.; Gruner, John Walter; Broderick, Thomas Monteith (1919). Contributions to the Geology of the Mesabi Range: With Special Reference to the Magnetites of the Iron-bearing Formation West of Mesaba.
- Grout, Frank Fitch; Broderick, Thomas Monteith (1919). The Magnetite Deposits of the Eastern Mesabi Range, Minnesota. LCCN gs20000272.
- Grout, Frank F. (1925). "The Vermilion Batholith of Minnesota". The Journal of Geology. 33 (5): 467–487. Bibcode:1925JG.....33..467G. doi:10.1086/623214. S2CID 128949540.
- Grout, Frank F. (1926). "The Use of Calculations in Petrology: A Study for Students". The Journal of Geology. 34 (6): 512–558. Bibcode:1926JG.....34..512G. doi:10.1086/623341. S2CID 129765252.
- Grout, F. F. (1932). Petrography and Petrology. McGraw-Hill. LCCN 32013552.
- Grout, F. F. (1933). "Contact Metamorphism of the Slates of Minnesota by Granite and by Gabbro Magmas". Geological Society of America Bulletin. 44 (5): 989–1040. Bibcode:1933GSAB...44..989G. doi:10.1130/GSAB-44-989.
- Grout, F. F.; Balk, R. (1934). "Internal structures in the Boulder batholith". Geological Society of America Bulletin. 45 (5): 877–896. Bibcode:1934GSAB...45..877G. doi:10.1130/GSAB-45-877.
- Grout, F. F. (1937). "Criteria of origin of inclusions in plutonic rocks". Geological Society of America Bulletin. 48 (11): 1521–1572. Bibcode:1937GSAB...48.1521G. doi:10.1130/GSAB-48-1521.
- Tyler, S. A.; Marsden, R. W.; Grout, F. F.; Thiel, G. A. (1940). "Studies of the Lake Superior Pre-Cambrian by Accessory-Mineral Methods". Geological Society of America Bulletin. 51 (10): 1429–1538. Bibcode:1940GSAB...51.1429T. doi:10.1130/GSAB-51-1429.
- Grout, F. F. (1941). "Formation of igneous-looking rocks by metasomatism: A critical review and suggested research". Geological Society of America Bulletin. 52 (10): 1525–1576. Bibcode:1941GSAB...52.1525G. doi:10.1130/GSAB-52-1525.
- Gruner, J. W.; Dutton, C. E.; Gibson, G. R.; Grout, F. F. (1941). "Structural geology of the Knife Lake area of northeastern Minnesota". Geological Society of America Bulletin. 52 (10): 1577–1642. Bibcode:1941GSAB...52.1577G. doi:10.1130/GSAB-52-1577.
- Grout, F. F. (1945). "Scale models of structures related to batholiths" (PDF). Am. Jour. Sci. 243: 260–284.
- Grout, F. F (1950). The titaniferous magnetites of Minnesota. Office of the Commissioner of the Iron Range Resources and Rehabilitation. LCCN a50009330.
- Grout, F. F.; Gruner, J. W.; Schwartz, G. M.; Thiel, G. A. (1951). "Precambrian Stratigraphy of Minnesota". Geological Society of America Bulletin. 62 (9): 1017. doi:10.1130/0016-7606(1951)62[1017:PSOM]2.0.CO;2. ISSN 0016-7606.
