= Pabstite =

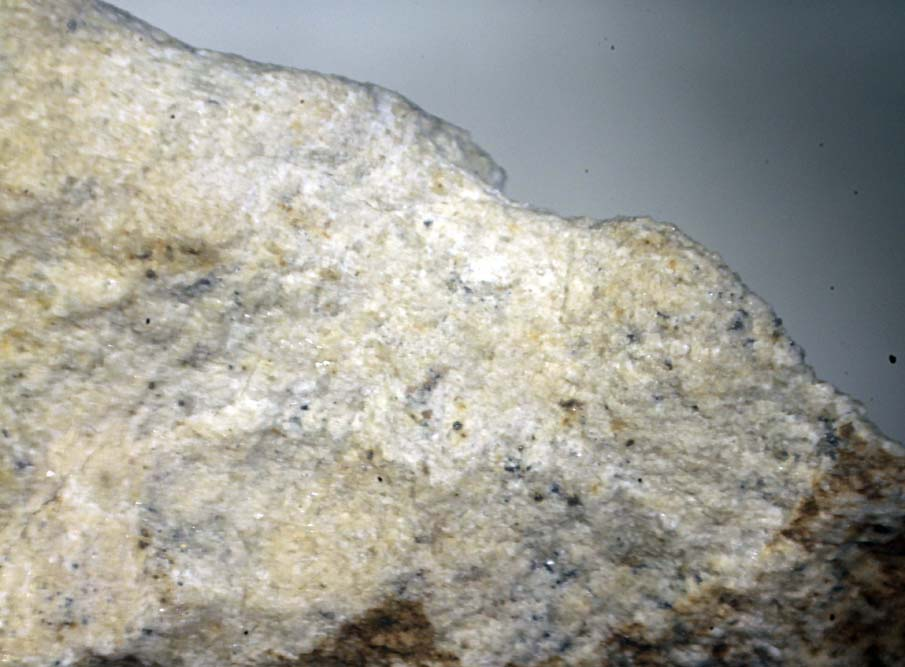
- Pabstite

General
- Category: Cyclosilicate
- Formula: Ba(Sn,Ti)Si_{3}O_{9}
- IMA symbol: Pab
- Strunz classification: 9.CA.05
- Dana classification: 59.01.01.03
- Crystal system: Hexagonal
- Crystal class: Ditrigonal dipyramidal (6̅m2); H-M symbol: (6̅ m2)
- Space group: P6̅c2

Identification
- Color: Colorless to white with a pink tinge
- Crystal habit: Granular anhedral, rare as crystals showing a trigonal outline
- Mohs scale hardness: 6
- Luster: Vitreous
- Specific gravity: 4.03
- Optical properties: Uniaxial (−)
- Refractive index: nω = 1.685 nε = 1.674
- Birefringence: δ = 0.011
- Ultraviolet fluorescence: Bluish white under short-wave UV

Pabstite is a barium tin titanium silicate mineral that is found in contact metamorphosed limestone. It belongs to the benitoite group of minerals. The chemical formula of pabstite is Ba(Sn,Ti)Si_{3}O_{9}. It is found in Santa Cruz, California. The crystal system of the mineral is hexagonal.

== Composition ==
Pabstite is 37.7% SiO_{2}, 3.8% TiO_{2}, 24.4% SnO_{2} and 33.2% BaO. However, Ti and Sn could vary from point to point by approximately ±0.5% TiO_{2} and ±1% SnO_{2}. Pabstite is a tin bearing analog of benitoite. Although, (Sn^{4+} = 0.71 Å) and (Ti^{4+}= 0.68Å) have similar charge and ionic size, it is uncommon to find them substituting each other.

== Geologic occurrence ==
Pabstite commonly occurs as anhedral crystals and masses that vary in their color from colorless to white. They produce a pink tinge when they are freshly broken. Large amounts of pabstite were found in Santa Cruz as fracture filling and disseminated grains in recrystallized siliceous limestones. This is geologic evidence of contact metamorphism. In addition, pabstite can be found in Rush Creek in California when benitoite contains small amounts of tin. It is commonly occurs in rocks that contain calcite, quartz, tremolite, witherite, phlogopite, diopside, minor amounts of forsterite and taramellite. Pabstite can also be found associated with galena, cassiterite and sphalerite.

== Structure ==
Pabstite is considered the tin analog of benitoite. It has a hexagonal crystal system with a P6*2C space group. Its dimensions are as follows, a= 6.7037(7), c= 9.824(1) Å3, C= 382.3(1) Å3, Z=2. Pabstite has the structure of the benitoite group of minerals. In the structure of pabstite, there are four oxygens surrounding the cations in a pseudo-tetrahedral arrangement. A three-membered cyclosilicate ring (Si_{3}O_{9}) is formed by repeating the tetrahedron using space group symmetry. Quadrivalent cations connect the rings to form a three-dimensional framework. Since the silicate rings have a geometry that is identical in all directions, a solid rigid unit is formed in the structure. In a distorted hexagonal antiprism arrangement, Ba, which has a high symmetry, is bounded by 12 oxygens. Two different BaـــO distances are present. [M^{4+} Si^{3}O^{9}] frameworks are connected by Ba cations which lead to a poor cleavage.

== Physical properties ==
Finding pabstite in the field is hard and rare. When using a shortwave ultraviolet light, bluish white fluorescence is revealed from the specimens. This property is commonly used to identify pabstite. Pabstite is colorless to white. The diameter of pabstite grains is usually less than 2 mm and they contain minute fluid and solid inclusions. Its hardness is 6 on Mohs scale of mineral hardness. Its density is 4.03 g/cm^{3} and it is uniaxial. The interference colors of pabstite are anomalous blue-violet and golden yellow. The refractive indices of pabstite are ω = 1.685±0.002 and ε = 1.674±0.002 which result in low birefringence and absent dichroism.

== Discovery and locations ==
Pabstite was first discovered in 1965 for an occurrence in the Kalkar quarry of Santa Cruz County, California. The mineral was named for Adolf Pabst (1899–1990) a mineralogy professor at the University of California, Berkeley.

Pabstite has also been reported from Tres Pozos, Baja California Norte, Mexico and the Alai Range of the Tien Shan Mountains in Tajikistan.
