= Robert Coleman (geologist) =

American geologist (1923–2020)

Robert G. Coleman (January 5, 1923 – October 18, 2020) was an American geologist.

== Career ==
He was a member of the United States National Academy of Sciences. His primary field of expertise was the formation and tectonic setting of ophiolites and ultramafic rocks. He was a retired professor of Geology from Stanford University and retired from the U.S. Geological Survey. He continued to conduct research and publish scientific books and articles.
