= Bursaite =

General
- Category: Sulfosalt mineral
- Formula: Pb_{5}Bi_{4}S_{11}
- Strunz classification: 2.JB.40a
- Crystal system: Orthorhombic; Intergrowth of two sulfosalts
- Space group: Bbmm

Identification
- Formula mass: 2177.65 g/mol
- Color: Gray to white
- Crystal habit: Prismatic crystals with platy, long grains
- Twinning: Lamellar twinning on (001), sometimes (110) plane
- Cleavage: Tabular on (100) - good
- Mohs scale hardness: 2.5 - 3
- Luster: Metallic
- Density: 6.2 g/cm^{3} (calculated)
- Optical properties: Opaque; strong anisotropy
- Birefringence: Weak in air, stronger in oil.
- Pleochroism: Weak; whitish blue to brownish gray
- Other characteristics: Not radioactive

Bursaite is a sulfosalt of the lillianite family. It has the formula Pb_{5}Bi_{4}S_{11} and orthorhombic structure. Bursaite is named after Bursa Province, Turkey, where it was discovered. It is generally located in regions rich in sulfur and commonly occurs alongside other sulfosalts. Its areas of formation are usually those that were once volcanogenic because it is generally aggregated with other minerals under intense heating. It was officially delisted as a mineral in 2006, being cited as an intergrowth of two other sulfosalts.

== History ==
Bursaite was discovered in a contact zone between a set of marbles and granites amidst the Uludağ massif in Bursa, Western Turkey, by scientist Rasit Tolun in 1955. Tolun was also the first to study the chemical composition of bursaite via flotation and superpanner tests. It was originally tested as an aggregate of a larger sulfosalt specimen. The flotation test involved sodium-based reagents and oils. The specimen was also chemically analyzed via X-ray spectroscopy and contained 4.24% pyrite, 4.78% blende, 5.48% bismuth and 85.3% Pb_{5}Bi_{4}S_{11}. From these results, bursaite's composition was deduced as 45% Pb, 1% Ag, 38.5% Bi and 14.7% S.

Bursaite is named after the Bursa Province of Turkey where it was discovered. After much discussion of bursaite's credibility as a mineral, it was eventually delisted as part of a mass discreditation of minerals.

== Structure ==
Bursaite's structure has not been well studied, and only basic structural information is known. Bursaite is an orthorhombic, dipyramidal mineral. Its symmetry is 2/m2/m2/m, space group Bbmm. It was once believed to be monoclinic due to its high reflective power and its oblique extinction.

The mineral contains ionic bonding between its lead and sulfur sites. Given the mineral's plate-like habit, it is likely bonded in sheets. It has the unit cell parameters of a = 13.399(20), b = 20.505(10), c = 4.117(5) and Z = [2]. These numbers yield an axial ratio a:b:c = 0.3078:1:1.5331. The mineral displays strong pleochroism and weak anisotropy.

== Physical properties ==
Bursaite has a tabular, plate-like habit. It is composed of many prismatic crystals, which generally form along the [100] axis, intertwined with long, plate-like grains. The prismatic crystals can grow up to 4 mm in length, and can contain polycrystalline aggregates. Twinning is common in the crystal, usually in (001) planes.

Although bursaite's color is usually gray, its weak pleochroism can give it a whitish-blue tinge, and its strong anisotropy yields colors ranging from blue to yellow. Many hand samples of bursaite appear to be nearly identical to the mineral lillianite.

In a microscope, bursauite shows distinct high reflective power and oblique extinction. The reflectance values are Rγ' = ~43 and Rα' = ~38 (in nm). The birefringence is generally weak in air, but stronger when bursaite is immersed in oils.

Bursaite has a hardness of 2.5 on the Mohs scale. It has a gray, metallic luster that appears white in polished sections. The mineral is also known to have good tabular cleavage along the (100) planes.

== Occurrence ==
Like many sulfosalts, bursaite occurs in regions abundant in sulfur. Close to its discovery grounds, it commonly occurs in Uludağ, Turkey, around a metamorphic scheelite deposit near Bursa. It is also associated with the sulfide veinlets around the Shumilovsk deposit in Russia, the volcanogenic massive Cofer deposit in Virginia, and the American Southwest. It also occurs Czech Republic, Lipari Islands, Mexico and Sweden.

Bursaite commonly occurs alongside other sulfosalts, such as sphalerite, pyrite, chalcopyrite, bismuth and scheelite. It is usually formed in areas that were once volcanogenic, because of the general nature of sulfosalts and because bursaite is generally aggregated with other minerals under intense heat.

== Delisting ==
Bursaite was official delisted as a mineral as part of a mass discreditation of minerals. It was officially cited as an intergrowth of two sulfosalt phases. Bursaite's status as a mineral was questioned almost from the time of its discovery. In 1956, Michael Fleischer of the American Mineralogist noted that bursaite's X-ray data shows many coincidences between those of the minerals kobellite and cosalite. However, later studies showed that bursaite's characteristics are nearly identical to the mineral lillianite's.

Bursaite's X-ray diffraction pattern is nearly identical to that of lillianite's, with only slightly more peaks than lillianite. This was eventually explained as a mixture of two orthorhombic phases in the mineral. The two phases in bursaite unlike those in lillianite are two Bbmm phases that appear to be exsolution products of phase III, which is simply the synthetic analogue of lillianite. Given this information, it was inferred that bursaite is an intergrowth of two sulfosalt phases, derived from lillianite.
