= Fluor-buergerite =

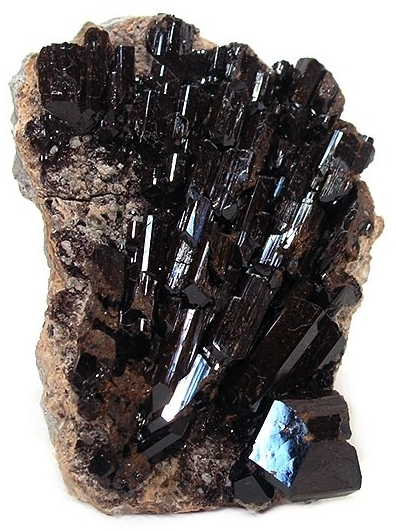

General
- Category: Cyclosilicate tourmaline
- Formula: NaFe^{3+}_{3}Al_{6}(BO_{3})_{3}Si_{6}O_{18}(O,F,OH)_{4}
- IMA symbol: Fbu
- Strunz classification: 9.CK.05
- Crystal system: Trigonal
- Crystal class: Ditrigonal pyramidal (3m); H-M symbol: (3m)
- Space group: R3m

Identification
- Color: Bronze, Dark Brown, Black, Dark Purple
- Cleavage: Distinct prismatic
- Mohs scale hardness: 7
- Streak: yellowish brown
- Diaphaneity: Translucent
- Specific gravity: 3.31
- Optical properties: Uniaxial (-)
- Refractive index: nω = 1.735 nε = 1.655
- Birefringence: δ = 0.080
- Other characteristics: Pyroelectric and piezoelectric

Fluor-buergerite, originally named buergerite, is a mineral species belonging to the tourmaline group. It was first described for an occurrence in rhyolitic cavities near Mexquitic, San Luis Potosi, Mexico. It was approved as a mineral in 1966 by the IMA and named in honor of Martin J. Buerger (1903–1986), professor of mineralogy at the Massachusetts Institute of Technology. It has also been reported from Minas Gerais, Brazil, and the Central Bohemia Region of the Czech Republic.
