= Samuel Bowring =

American geoscientist

Samuel A. Bowring (Sept. 27, 1953 – July 17, 2019) was the Robert R. Schrock Professor Emeritus of Geology in the Dept. of Earth and Planetary Sciences at the Massachusetts Institute of Technology. He was expert in the field of U-Pb zircon geochronology, pushing the limits of geochronologic techniques to unprecedented analytical precision and accuracy and was expert in constraining rates of geologic processes and the timing of significant events in the geologic record. He investigated the explosion of multi-cellular life in the Early Cambrian as well as the end-Permian and the end-Cretaceous mass extinctions.

Bowring was born in Portsmouth, New Hampshire and raised in Durham, New Hampshire. He graduated from the University of New Hampshire with a BS in geology in 1976, from the New Mexico Institute of Mining and Technology with an MS in 1980, and from University of Kansas with a PhD in geology in 1985. He was an assistant professor at Washington University in St. Louis, Missouri, from 1984 to 1990. In 1991 he joined the faculty of the Department of Earth, Atmospheric and Planetary Sciences at MIT.

His major contributions were recognized by many organizations and institutions, including the National Academy of Sciences (Member, 2015), the American Association for the Advancement of Science (Member, 2013), the American Geophysical Union (Fellow, 2008); Norman L. Bowen Award, 2010; Walter H. Bucher Medal, (2016), the Geochemical Society (Fellow, 2011), and the Geological Society of America (Fellow, 1999)—and, MIT (Breene M. Kerr Professorship, 2002–2007; Margaret MacVicar Faculty Fellow, 2006—). Bowring served on the first-year learning community Terrascope (2006–2014) as associate director and then director, and chairing the (former) Undergraduate Committee (2002–2016).
