= Herbert E. Merwin =

American mineralogist and petrologist

Herbert Eugene Merwin (20 February 20 1878, Newton, Kansas – 29 January 1963, Washington, D.C.) was an American mineralogist and petrologist.

Merwin grew up in Hensonville, New York after moving there with his family when he was two years old. After graduating from high school, he taught for several years in New York State public high schools and at the Normal School in Oneonta. He then studied at Harvard University, where he received his bachelor's degree in 1907 and his Ph.D. in 1911. He became in 1909 a staff member of the Geophysical Laboratory of the Carnegie Institution in Washington, D.C., and was employed there until his retirement in 1945. After retirement he continued there as a research associate until 1959.

He was considered a leading authority on crystal optics.

He was president in 1931 of the Mineralogical Society of America, whose Roebling Medal he received in 1949. The mineral merwinite is named in his honor.

== Selected publications ==
- Some late Wisconsin and post-Wisconsin shore-lines of northwestern Vermont , Cambridge, Massachusetts: Printed for the Museum, 1908
- Mineralogical and petrographical researches, with special reference to the stability ranges of the alkaline feldspars, Ph. D. Harvard University 1911
- with George Atwater Rankin: Rankin, G. A.; Merwin, H. E. (1916). "The ternary system CaO-Al_{2}O_{3}-MgO". Journal of the American Chemical Society. 38 (3): 568–588. doi:10.1021/ja02260a006.
- with G. A. Rankin: "The ternary system MgO-Al_{2}O_{3}-SiO_{2}". American Journal of Science. (series 4, vol. 45). 195: 301–325. 1918.
- with Eugen Posnjak: "The hydrated ferric oxides". American Journal of Science. (series 4, vol. 47). 197: 311–348. 1919.
- with John Bright Ferguson: "The ternary system CaO-MgO-SiO_{2}". American Journal of Science. (series 4, vol. 48). 198: 81–123. 1919.
- with E. Posnjak: Posnjak, E.; Merwin, H. E. (1922). "The system, Fe_{2}O_{3}—SO_{3}—H_{2}O". Journal of the American Chemical Society. 44 (9): 1965–1994. doi:10.1021/ja01430a016.
- with Howard Shreve Roberts: "The system MgO-FeO-Fe_{2}O_{3} in air at one atmosphere". American Journal of Science. 122: 145–157. 1931.
- with Robert Hamilton Lombard: Merwin, Herbert Eugene; Lombard, Robert Hamilton (1937). "The system, Cu-Fe-S". Economic Geology. 32 (2_Suppl): 203–284. doi:10.2113/gsecongeo.32.2_suppl.203.
