= Isabel P. Montañez =

American sedimentologist

Isabel Montañez
- Born: Isabel Patricia Montañez; March 17, 1960
- Citizenship: USA and Swiss
- Education: Bryn Mawr College (AB); Virginia Polytechnic Institute (PhD); 1989
- Awards: Arthur L. Day Medal (2023); National Academy of Sciences (elected 2021); Francis J. Pettijohn Medal (2021); Jean Baptiste Lamarck Medal (2019); California Academy of Sciences, Fellow (2020); Union Fellow, AGU (2020); Laurence L. Sloss Award (2017); Guggenheim Fellow (2011); James Lee Wilson Award (1996); J. "Cam" Sproule Memorial Award (1996)
- Scientific career
- Fields: Paleoclimatology; Sedimentary Geology & Geochemistry; Carbonate Diagenesis
- Institutions: University of California, Davis; University of California, Riverside
- Website: geology.ucdavis.edu/people/faculty/montanez.php

Isabel Patricia Montañez is a paleoclimatologist specializing in geochemical records of ancient climate change. She is a distinguished professor and a Chancellor's Leadership Professor in the department of earth and planetary sciences at University of California, Davis. As of 2021, Montañez is the director of the UC Davis Institute of the Environment.

== Early life ==
Isabel Montañez was born in Geneva, Switzerland, to a Swiss mother and a Colombian father. As a child, she moved to Manchester, England, and then in 1969 to Pennsylvania, United States. She enjoyed and excelled at math and science as a child and was encouraged to become a geologist by an inspiring teacher.

== Education ==
Montañez attended Bryn Mawr College where she majored in geology and graduated with B.A. in 1981. After Bryn Mawr, she worked as a consultant and then as a museum technician for the Smithsonian Museum of Natural History where she became interested in ancient climate change. She went on to work with Fred Read at Virginia Polytechnic Institute and was his first woman graduate student. She earned her PhD in geology in 1989.

== Career ==
Montañez started as an assistant professor of geology in the Department of Earth Sciences, University of California, Riverside in 1990 and was promoted to associate professor in 1995. She moved to the Department of Geology (now the Department of Earth and Planetary Sciences) at the University of California, Davis in 1998 where she continues to work as a professor. She was the President of the Geological Society of America from 2017 to 2018. She is also a role model for women in science in general, and Latina scientists in particular.

== Research ==
Montañez has published ~180 publications in peer reviewed scientific journals. and has co-edited a number of important books and special journal issues. Early in her career, she focused on carbonate geochemistry, dolomitization, and sequence stratigraphy to reconstruct the stable and Sr isotopic composition of early Paleozoic seawater and to document mechanistic linkages between sea-level change, stratigraphic cyclicity, ocean chemistry, and the origin of massive dolomites.

Prof. Montañez's more recent contributions have consisted of developing quantitative proxies for paleoclimate reconstruction. Much of this work has focused on Paleozoic and Mesozoic climate change during periods of acute glaciation, oceanic anoxic events of greenhouse periods, and greenhouse gas-forced turnovers from icehouses to greenhouse conditions. This work involved development and refinement of geochemical proxies of atmospheric CO_{2}, seasonality, and surface temperatures. Her work on past periods of major climate change spans the marine to terrestrial realms and integrates field and laboratory studies with numerical modeling. Field studies have spanned South America, China, Europe, and North and Central America. Recent studies evaluate the nature of CO_{2}—climate—vegetation feedbacks in Earth's earliest tropical forests through the study of fossil plants, time series of past atmospheric CO_{2}, process-based ecosystem modeling, and climate simulations. In addition to her contributions to the understanding of how CO_{2} in the atmosphere influenced deep-time climates, Montañez's research also extends to Pleistocene and Holocene records of hydroclimate in California through the geochemical study of stalagmites in Sierra Nevada caves and climate modeling. Over the past two decades, Montañez has played an active role in shaping the NSF's and the National Academy of Science's appreciation of deep-time paleoclimate and paleoceanographic records and their relevance to society.

== Research outside climate ==
Although much of her work is regarding geochemistry and paleoclimatology, she also has published articles regarding paleontology and has worked towards the completion of the dinosaur fossil record. In 2011, in collaboration with other scientists she wrote about the discovery of a basal dinosaur "from the dawn of the dinosaur era in southwestern Pangea." In this work, unlike most of her other articles she describes the dinosaur found and where and when it could have been found. The article also talks about the effect of fauna 230 million years ago, as dinosaurs existed as the largest carnivores and smallest herbivores. An important point made was the idea that the extinction of nondinosaurian herbivores was not caused by an increase in dinosaur diversity. This idea challenged the previously accepted notion that dinosaurs ascended the food pyramid due to opportunism.

== Active role in climate change conversations ==
Montanez is the lead author of an article about what the ancient CO_{2} record may mean for future climate change. Montanez says "we show that climate change not only impacts plants but that plants' responses to climate can in turn impact climate change itself, making for amplified and in many cases unpredictable outcomes," explaining "most of our estimates for future carbon dioxide levels and climate do not fully take into consideration the various feedbacks involving forests, so current projections likely underestimate the magnitude of carbon dioxide flux to the atmosphere." The recent unprecedented rate of increasing atmospheric CO_{2} raises concerns about melting ice sheets, rising sea level, major climate change, and biodiversity loss – all of which were evident more than 300 million years, the only other time in Earth's history when high CO_{2} accompanied ice at the polar regions.

== Awards, Fellowships, and honors ==
Montanez was elected to the National Academy of Sciences in 2021. She is a fellow of the Geological Society of America (elected 2003), The Geochemical Society and The European Association of Geochemistry (2016), the American Association for the Advancement of Science (2012), AGU (elected 2020), and received a John Simon Guggenheim Memorial Foundation fellowship in 2011. Other notable awards include:

- James Lee Wilson Award for Excellence in Sedimentary Geology SEPM (Society for Sedimentary Geology's Young Scientist Award) (1996)
- J. "Cam" Sproule Memorial Award, American Association of Petroleum Geologists(best published paper, by a young scientist, published by AAPG or an affiliated society) (1996)
- ‘SEPM Outstanding Paper for 1992’, Journal of Sedimentary Petrology (1994)
- American Association of Petroleum Geologists Distinguished Lecturer (2000–2001)
- F. Earl Ingerson Lecture, The Geochemical Society (2012)
- Herbert A. Young Society Dean's Fellow, UC Davis (2013)
- Chancellor's Leadership Professor Award, UC Davis (2016)
- Laurence L. Sloss Award (2017), Sedimentary Geology Division, The Geological Society of America
- Jean Baptiste Lamarck Medal (2019), European Geosciences Union (EGU) Division of Stratigraphy, Sedimentology, and Paleontology
- Fellow of the California Academy of Sciences (2020)
- Francis J. Pettijohn Medal, Society for Sedimentary Geology (SEPM) (2021)
- The UC Davis Prize for Undergraduate Teaching and Scholarly Achievement, (2021)
- Arthur L. Day Medal, The Geological Society of America (2023)
