= Joseph Victor Smith =

British mineralogist (1928–2007)

Professor Joseph Victor Smith FRS
- Born: 30 July 1928; Crich
- Died: 7 April 2007 (aged 78)
- Education: University of Cambridge (B.A., physics, 1948); University of Cambridge (PhD, crystallography, 1951)
- Spouse: Brenda Wallis
- Awards: Murchison Medal; Roebling Medal (1982)
- Scientific career
- Workplaces: Carnegie Institution of Washington; Pennsylvania State University; University of Chicago

Joseph Victor Smith FRS was a British mineralogist and crystallographer, best known for his work on feldspars and zeolites, and on lunar samples returned during the Apollo missions.

== Life and career ==
Smith was born and brought up on a farm near Crich, Derbyshire, and attended school in Fritchley. He won a scholarship to Gonville and Caius College, Cambridge in 1945, where he studied natural sciences, specialising in physics and graduating in 1948. He remained in Cambridge to study for a PhD in crystallography, which he completed in 1951. In 1951 he married Brenda Wallis, and then sailed on the Queen Mary to take up a fellowship at the Geophysical Laboratory of the Carnegie Institute of Washington. From 1954 to 1956, Smith held the post of demonstrator at the University of Cambridge, and he later held posts at Pennsylvania State University and the University of Chicago, where he was appointed professor in 1960; a post he held until he retired in 2005.

At Chicago, Smith played a leading role in establishing instruments and capacity for the micro-analysis of materials. After setting up an early electron microprobe, Smith later led the way for X-ray synchrotron analysis of a wide range of materials by establishing the Centre for Advanced Radiation Sources (CARS), using beamlines at the Advanced Photon Source and the Argonne National Laboratory.

== Books ==
Smith wrote several research monographs, on the structure, properties and compositions of the feldspar minerals.

- JV Smith, 1974, Feldspar minerals: crystal structure and physical properties
- JV Smith, 1974, Feldspar minerals: chemical and textural properties

== Awards ==
In recognition of his contributions to mineralogy, Smith was awarded the Murchison Medal of the Geological Society of London in 1980, and the Roebling Medal of the Mineralogical Society of America in 1982. He was elected Fellow of the Royal Society in 1978 and was elected to the United States' National Academy of Sciences in 1986.

Smith's archives are held at the University of Chicago.
