= O. Frank Tuttle =

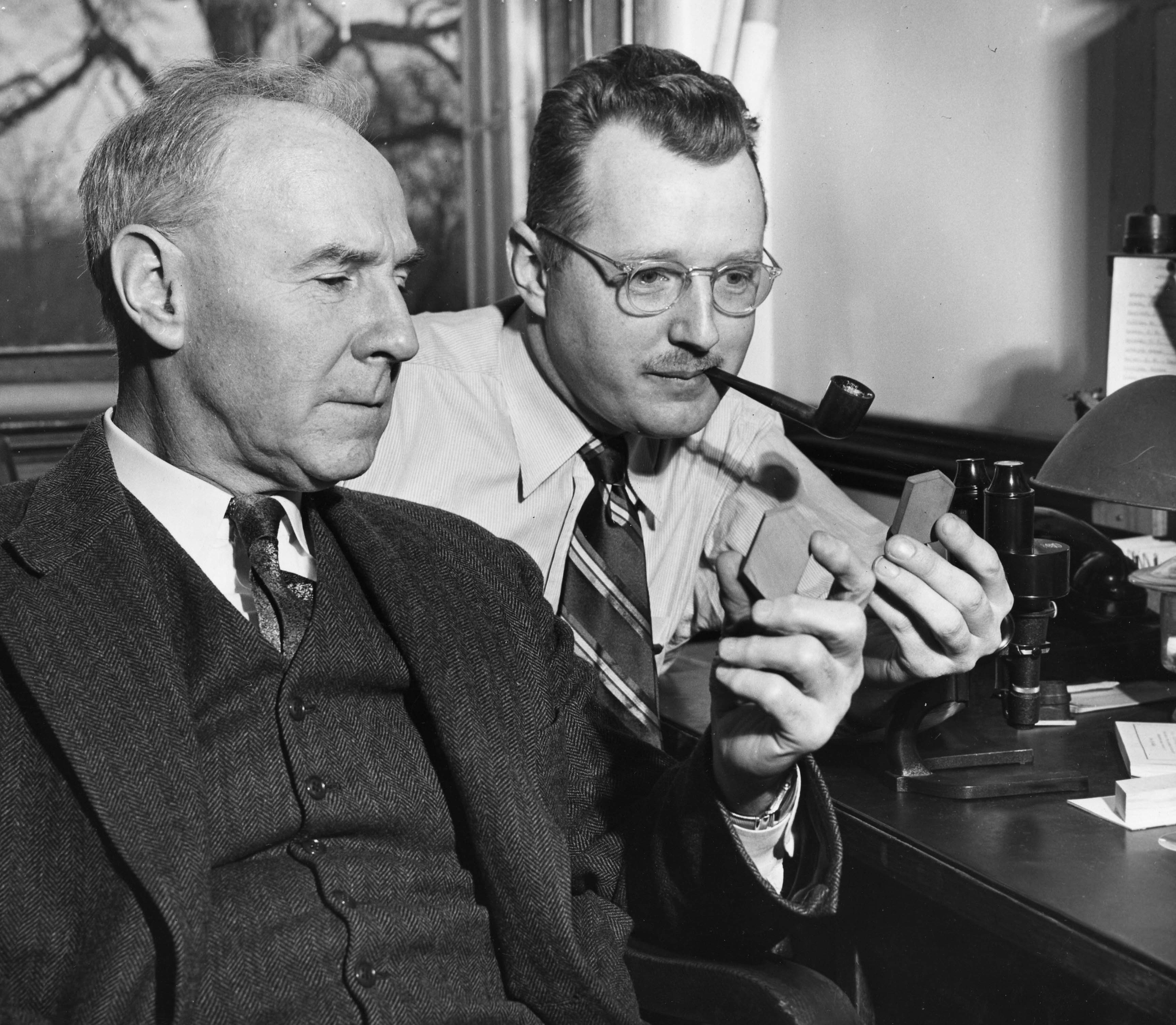
Norman Levi Bowen (left) with O. Frank Tuttle

Orville Frank Tuttle (June 25, 1916, Olean, New York – December 13, 1983, Tucson, Arizona) was an American mineralogist, geochemist, and petrologist, known for his research on granites and feldspars, with pioneering development of apparatus in experimental petrography.

After completing high school in Smethport, Pennsylvania, he worked in the Bradford oilfields and studied geology at Pennsylvania State College (renamed in 1953 Pennsylvania State University), where he received a bachelor's degree in 1939 and a master's degree in 1940. He then matriculated at Massachusetts Institute of Technology for his doctoral work, which was interrupted by the Second World War, in which he was engaged in wartime research on crystal growth and characterization. In 1948 he received his doctorate at MIT. In 1947, he started his collaboration in experimental petrography with Norman L. Bowen at the Geophysical Laboratory of the Carnegie Institution in Washington. There he invented the "Tuttle Press" and the "Tuttle Bomb" (a high-pressure chamber), which were widely used in experimental petrography. Together with Bowen he explored in particular the formation of granite. In 1953 he became professor of geochemistry at Pennsylvania State University. In 1959 he became dean of the college of mineral industries. In 1960, he was diagnosed with Parkinson's disease in the early stages. In 1965, he moved to Stanford University, where he was granted sick leave in 1967 and formally resigned in 1971. He moved to Tucson with his wife. In 1977 he received a tentative diagnosis of Alzheimer's disease and moved to a nursing home.

He was awarded in 1952 the Mineralogical Society of America Award, in 1975 the Roebling Medal, and in 1967 the Arthur L. Day Medal. He was elected a foreign member of the Geological Society of London and in 1968 a member of the National Academy of Sciences.

He married Dawn Hardes in 1941 and the couple had two daughters.
