= Frederick Eugene Wright =

American optical scientist and geophysicist

Frederick Eugene Wright (October 16, 1877 – August 25, 1953) was an American optical scientist and geophysicist. He was the second president of the Optical Society of America from 1918-1919.

== Biography ==
He was born in Marquette, Michigan, and his father was a state geologist. In 1895 his mother took Frederick and his two brothers to Germany where he would complete his education. He was awarded his Ph.D. summa cum laude from the University of Heidelberg.

After returning to the United States, he taught at the Michigan College of Mines and became the Assistant State Geologist. He moved to Washington D.C. in 1904, joining the United States Geological Survey. He then spent some time in exploration of Alaska. In 1906 he joined the Carnegie Institution as a member of their Geophysical Laboratory. He remained on the staff until his retirement in 1944.

In 1906, he met Kathleen Finley and in 1909 they were married. Their daughter, Mary Helen Wright Greuter (1914–1997), became a pioneer in the study of science history.

Among his contributions were studies in the military uses of optical glass; physical study of lunar features based on the properties of the reflected light, and the precambrian geology of the region near Lake Superior. At the time of his death he was considered the foremost authority on the Moon.

He served as the home secretary of the National Academy of Sciences, of which he was also a member, for two decades. He was a member of the Optical Society of America, and was president for three years. In 1941 he became president of the Mineralogical Society of America. He was also a member of the London Physical Society, a fellow of the American Academy of Arts and Sciences, and a member of the American Philosophical Society.

== Awards and honors ==
- Exceptional Service Medal, U.S. Army, 1946.
- Roebling Medal, 1952.
- The crater Wright on the Moon is co-named for him and two others.

== Bibliography ==
He was the author of 140 papers.

- The Manufacture of Optical Glass and Optical Systems Army Ordnance Department, Government Printing Office, 1921.

== See also ==
- Optical Society of America#Past Presidents of the OSA
