= Robert D. Shannon =

American industrial chemist

- Born: 28 August 1935 (age 91); Highland Park, Michigan, U.S.
- Died: May 31, 2026 (aged 90); Boulder, Colorado, U.S.
- Education: B.S. 1957, M.S. 1959 University of Illinois; Ph.D 1964 University of California at Berkeley
- Known for: Ionic Radii tabulations Inorganic chemistry Dielectric Properties; Noble-Metal Oxides
- Scientific career
- Fields: Chemistry
- Workplaces: DuPont de Nemours, Inc.

Robert Day Shannon (born 1935) was a retired research chemist formerly at DuPont de Nemours, Inc.

== Career ==
Shannon received his B.S. and M.S. degrees in Ceramic Engineering from the University of Illinois in 1957 and 1959. He then went on to receive his Ph.D. in Ceramic Engineering from the University of California at Berkeley in 1960. He then joined the DuPont Company as a research chemist from 1964 to 1971 where he concentrated on high-pressure synthesis and precious metal oxide chemistry. He then spent 1971 conducting post-doctorate studies at McMaster University in Hamilton, Ontario, working with Chris Calvo on the crystal structures of a number of vanadates and with David Brown on bond strength-bond length relationships useful in determining H locations in hydroxides and hydrates. Next, he took a sabbatical leave from DuPont and spent 1972 at the CNRS and teaching at the University of Grenoble, France as a visiting professor, where he presented a course on solid state chemistry and conducted research on high-pressure chemistry of vanadates. He returned to DuPont in 1973 to do research on new ionic conductors and precious metal oxide chemistry.

In 1982, he was granted another sabbatical leave from DuPont and worked on catalysis with zeolites at the Institute de Catalyse in Lyon, France. Upon completion of the sabbatical, he returned to DuPont and worked for another ten years before retiring in 1992.

After retirement, he received a grant from the Alexander von Humboldt Foundation to continue his research on ion polarizabilities in collaboration with Reinhard Fischer in 1994 at the Universities of Mainz and Bremen in Germany and with Olaf Medenbach at the Ruhr-Universität in Bochum, Germany. There, he prepared three papers on refractive indices and electronic polarizabilities in oxides, and other compounds. He has since moved to Colorado where he has been associated with the University of Colorado Boulder · Cooperative Institute for Research in Environmental Sciences (CIRES).

Shannon was a member of the American Chemical Society and the American Crystallographic Association. He was elected a Fellow of the Mineralogical Society of America. He has served on the Evaluation Panel for Materials Science at the National Bureau of Standards, and on the National Science Foundation Subcommittee for Oversight Review of Solid State Chemistry.

== Research ==
Shannon has about 164 publications that, together, have received over 77 thousand citations. His work on ionic radii of ions has drawn particularly wide attention. In a 2014 Nature paper his 1976 work on the ionic radii of ions was recognized as the 22d most cited paper in all of science. It is also been cited as the highest formally-cited database of all time. He has a number of patents on glass compositions, zeolite catalysts, noble-metal oxide, electrodes, and chemical compounds.

== Mineral named in his honor ==
The mineral bobshannonite, Na_{2}KBa(Mn,Na)_{8}(Nb,Ti)_{4}(Si_{2}O_{7})_{4}O_{4}(OH)_{4}(O,F)_{2}, was named in his honor in recognition of his major contributions to the field of crystal chemistry in particular and mineralogy in general through his development of accurate and comprehensive ionic radii and his work on dielectric properties of minerals.

== Selected highly cited publications ==
- Shannon RD, Fischer RX (2021) Empirical electronic polarizabilities for use in refractive index measurements III. Structures with short [5]Ti-O and vanadyl bonds. Canadian Mineralogist 59, 107–124.
- Shannon RD, Fischer RX (2006) Empirical electronic polarizabilities in oxides, hydroxides, oxyfluorides, and oxychlorides. Physical Review B 73, 235111/1-235111/28.
- Shannon RD; Shannon RC, Medenbach O, Fischer RX (2002) Refractive index and dispersion of fluorides and oxides. Journal of Physical and Chemical Reference Data 31, 931–970.
- Medenbach O, Dettmar D, Shannon RD, Fischer RX, Yen WM (2001) Refractive index and optical dispersion of rare earth oxides using a small-prism technique. Journal of Optics A: Pure and Applied Optics 3, 174–177.
- Shannon RD (1993) Dielectric polarizabilities of ions in oxides and fluorides. Journal of Applied Physics 73, 348–66.
- Shannon RD, Oswald RA, Parise JB, Chai BHT, Byszewski P, Pajaczkowska A, Sobolewski R (1992) Dielectric constants and crystal structures of calcium yttrium aluminate (CaYAlO_{4}), calcium neodymium aluminate (CaNdAlO_{4}), and lanthanum strontium aluminate (SrLaAlO_{4}), and deviations from the oxide additivity rule. Journal of Solid State Chemistry 98, 90–98.
- Shannon RD, Rossman GR (1992) Dielectric constants of silicate garnets and the oxide additivity rule. American Mineralogist 77, 94–100.
- Coudurier G, Auroux A, Vedrine JC, Farlee RD, Abrams L, Shannon RD (1987) Properties of boron-substituted ZSM-5 and ZSM-11 zeolites. Journal of Catalysis 108, 1–14.
- Shannon RD, Gardner KH, Staley RH, Bergeret G, Gallezot P, Auroux A (1985) The nature of the nonframework aluminum species formed during the dehydroxylation of H-Y. Journal of Physical Chemistry 89, 4778–4788.
- Rossman GR; Shannon RD and Waring, RK (1981) Origin of the Yellow Color of Complex Nickel Oxides. Journal of Solid State Chemistry 39, 277–287.
- Tranqui D, Shannon RD, Chen Hy, Iijima S, Baur WH (1979) Crystal structure of ordered Li_{4}SiO_{4} Acta Crystallographica Section B-Structural Science 35, 2479–2487.
- Shannon RD, Taylor BE, Gier TE, Chen HY, Berzins T (1978) Ionic conductivity in sodium yttrium silicon oxide (Na_{5}YSi_{4}O_{12})-type silicates. Inorganic Chemistry 17, 958–964.
- Shannon RD, Gillson JL, Bouchard RJ (1977) Single crystal synthesis and electrical properties of cadmium stannite and stannate, indium tellurate, and cadmium indicate. Journal of Physics and Chemistry of Solids 38, 877–881.
- Shannon RD, Taylor BE, English AD, Berzins T (1977) New lithium solid electrolytes. Electrochimica Acta (1977), 22(7), 783–796.
- Shannon RD (1976) Revised effective ionic radii and systematic studies of interatomic distances in halides and chalcogenides. Acta Crystallographica, Section A: Crystal Physics, Diffraction, Theoretical and General Crystallography, A32, 751–67.
- Brown, ID, Shannon RD (1973) Empirical bond-strength-bond-length curves for oxides. Acta Crystallographica Section A: Crystal Physics, Diffraction, Theoretical and General Crystallography 29, 266–282.
- Shannon RD, Calvo C (1973) Refinement of the crystal structure of low temperature lithium vanadate(V) and analysis of mean bond lengths in phosphates, arsenates, and vanadates. Journal of Solid State Chemistry 6, 538–49.
- Shannon RD, Rogers DB, Prewitt CT, Gillson JL (1971) Chemistry of noble metal oxide. III. Electrical transport properties and crystal chemistry of ABO_{2} compounds with the delafossite structure. Inorganic Chemistry 10, 723–727.
- Prewitt CT, Shannon RD, Rogers DB (1971) Chemistry of Nobel Metal Oxides. II. Chemistry of noble metal oxide. II. Crystal structures of platinum cobalt dioxide, palladium cobalt dioxide, copper iron dioxide, and silver iron dioxide. Inorganic Chemistry 10,.719–723.
- Shannon RD; Rogers DB, Prewitt, CT (1971) Chemistry of noble metal oxide. I. Syntheses and properties of ABO_{2} delafossite compounds. Inorganic Chemistry 10, 713–718.
- Shannon RD, Prewitt CT (1970) Revised Values of Effective Ionic Radii. Acta Crystallographica Section B-Structural Crystallography and Crystal Chemistry B 26, 1046–1048.
- Shannon RD and Prewitt CT (1970) Effective Ionic Radii and Crystal Chemistry. Journal of Inorganic & Nuclear Chemistry 32, 1427–1441.
- Shannon RD, Bierstedt PE (1970) Single-crystal growth and electrical properties of barium plumbate. Journal of the American Ceramic Society 53, 635–636.
- Prewitt CT, Shannon RD, Rogers D, Sleight AW (1969) C rare earth oxide-corundum transition and crystal chemistry of oxides having the corundum structure. Inorganic Chemistry 8, 1985–1993.
- Rogers DB, Shannon RD, Sleight AW, Gillson JL (1969) Crystal chemistry of metal dioxides with rutile-related structures. Inorganic Chemistry 8, 841–9.
- Shannon RD and Prewitt, CT (1969) Effective Ionic Radii in Oxides and Fluorides. Acta Crystallographica Section B-Structural Crystallography and Crystal Chemistry B 25, 925–946.
- Prewitt, CT and Shannon RD (1968) Crystal structure of a high-pressure form of boron sesquioxide. Acta Crystallographica Section B-Structural Crystallography and Crystal Chemistry B 24, 869–874.
- Shannon RD (1968) Synthesis and properties of two new members of the rutile family, RhO_{2} and PtO_{2}. Solid State Communications 6, 139–143.
- Shannon RD, Pask JA (1965) The kinetics and mechanism of the anatase-rutile transformation. Journal of the American Ceramic Society 48, 391–398
- Shannon RD, Pask JA (1964) Topotaxy in the anatase-rutile transformation. American Mineralogist 49, 1707–1717.
- Shannon RD (1964) Activated complex theory applied to the thermal decomposition of solids. Transactions of the Faraday Society 60 (503P), pp. 1902–1913.
