= Hatten Yoder =

American geophysicist (1921-2003)

- Yoder in 1981
- Born: March 20, 1921; Cleveland, Ohio, U.S.
- Died: August 2, 2003 (aged 82); Bethesda, Maryland, U.S.
- Education: University of Chicago; Massachusetts Institute of Technology
- Awards: Wollaston Medal; Arthur L. Day Medal; Roebling Medal
- Scientific career
- Workplaces: Carnegie Institute of Washington

Hatten Schuyler Yoder, Jr., (March 20, 1921 – August 2, 2003) was an American geophysicist and experimental petrologist who conducted pioneering work on minerals under high pressure and temperature. He was noted for his study of silicates and igneous rocks.

== Life ==
Yoder was born in Cleveland, Ohio on March 20, 1921.

Yoder was educated at the University of Chicago and the Massachusetts Institute of Technology. He served as the fourth Director of the Carnegie Institution of Washington's Geophysical Laboratory, from 1971 to 1986. In 1979, he received the Wollaston Medal.

He died on August 2, 2003 at Suburban Hospital in Bethesda, Maryland from sepsis and renal failure.

== Awards and recognition ==
- Member, United States National Academy of Sciences, 1958
- Arthur L. Day Medal, Geological Society of America, 1962
- Wollaston Medal, Geological Society of London, 1979
- Member, American Academy of Arts and Sciences, 1979
- Member, American Philosophical Society, 1979
- Roebling Medal, 1992

== Published works ==
- Yoder, Hatten S. (2004). The Geophysical Laboratory. Centennial History of the Carnegie Institution of Washington. Vol. III. Cambridge: Cambridge Univ. Press. ISBN 978-0-521-83080-5.
