= Robert J. Bodnar =

American geochemist

Academic background
- Education: BS, Chemistry, 1975, University of Pittsburgh; MS, Geology, 1978, University of Arizona; PhD, Geochemistry and Mineralogy, 1985, Pennsylvania State University

Academic work
- Institutions: Virginia Tech

Robert "Bob" J. Bodnar (born August 25, 1949) is an American geoscientist. He is a University Distinguished Professor and C. C. Garvin Professor of Geochemistry at Virginia Tech.

== Early life and education ==
Bodnar earned his Bachelor of Science degree at the University of Pittsburgh, Master's degree from the University of Arizona, and his PhD at Pennsylvania State University.

== Career ==
Upon completing his PhD, Bodnar joined the geosciences faculty at Virginia Tech and was shortly thereafter named C.C. Garvin Professor of Geochemistry in 1997. Two years later, he was the first to discover liquid water fluid inclusions in a meteorite that fell in Texas.

While serving in the role of a University Distinguished Professor, Bodnar researches the properties and roles of fluids in natural and synthetic materials in combination with geology, geochemistry, physical chemistry, and planetary, materials, and environmental sciences. In 2007, Bodnar was elected a Fellow of the American Association for the Advancement of Science for his "distinguished contributions to the field of applied and experimental geochemistry, especially in the area of study of natural and synthetic fluid inclusions." Following this, he began working on creating a scientific framework to allow Virginians to understand the costs and benefits of uranium mining in the state. In 2010, Bodnar was the recipient of the Silver Medal of the Society of Economic Geologists "for the performance of unusually original work in the earth sciences" and an honorary degree from the University of Naples Federico II.

In recognition of his research, Bodnar was named an honorary Fellow of the Geological Society of India and received the Thomas Jefferson Medal for Outstanding Contributions to Natural Science.
