= Groutite =

Manganese oxide mineral

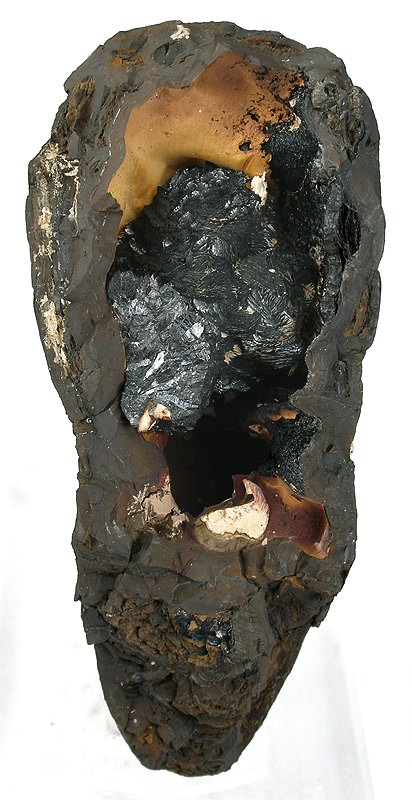
- Groutite crystals within a manganese nodule

General
- Category: Oxide mineral
- Formula: Mn^{3+}O(OH)
- IMA symbol: Gro
- Strunz classification: 4.FD.10
- Crystal system: Orthorhombic
- Crystal class: Dipyramidal (mmm); H-M symbol: (2/m 2/m 2/m)
- Space group: Pbnm
- Unit cell: a = 4.56, b = 10.7 c = 2.87 [Å]; Z = 4

Identification
- Color: Jet-black
- Crystal habit: Wedge or lens-shaped crystals; acicular, striated prisms
- Twinning: Reported, unknown law
- Cleavage: Perfect on {010}; less perfect on {100}
- Fracture: Uneven
- Tenacity: Brittle
- Mohs scale hardness: 3.5 - 4.0
- Luster: Brilliant submetallic to adamantine
- Streak: Dark brown
- Diaphaneity: Opaque
- Specific gravity: 4.144
- Optical properties: Biaxial (+)
- Refractive index: n_{α} = 2.100 - 2.200 n_{γ} = 2.100
- Pleochroism: Very strong; X = very dark brown to black; Y = yellowish brown
- 2V angle: Measured: 40° to 50°

Groutite is a manganese oxide mineral with formula Mn^{3+}O(OH). It is a member of the diaspore group and is trimorphous with manganite and feitknechtite. It forms lustrous black crystals in the orthorhombic system.

It occurs in weathered banded iron formations, metamorphosed manganese ore bodies and hydrothermal ore environments. It was first described in 1945 for an occurrence in the Mahnomen mine, Cuyuna Range, Crow Wing County, Minnesota and named for petrologist Frank Fitch Grout (1880–1958), of the University of Minnesota.
