= T. Mark Harrison =

American isotope geochemist

T. Mark Harrison is an American isotope geochemist based in California. He is Distinguished Professor of Geochemistry in the Department of Earth, Planetary and Space Sciences, University of California – Los Angeles.

== Education ==
A native of Vancouver, Canada, Harrison received his B.Sc. (Hons.) from the University of British Columbia, in 1977. His Ph.D. research from 1978 to 1980 developing ^{40}Ar/^{39}Ar thermochronology was conducted under the supervision of Prof. Ian McDougall at the Australian National University.

== Academic life ==
Following a postdoctoral fellowship at the Carnegie Institution of Washington, Harrison spent 8 years on the faculty of the department of geological sciences at the State University of New York at Albany rising from assistant to full professor. In 1989, he moved to UCLA, where he served as chair of the department of earth and space sciences from 1997 to 2000 becoming a distinguished professor in 2003. He took leave from UCLA to take up an appointment as university professor and director of the Research School of Earth Sciences at the Australian National University from 2001 to 2006. He returned to UCLA in 2006 to take up Directorship of the Institute of Geophysics and Planetary Physics until 2011.

== Awards ==
Harrison received the Presidential Young Investigator Award of the National Science Foundation in 1985, the Outstanding Young Alumnus Award of the University of British Columbia in 1988, the Norman L. Bowen Award of the American Geophysical Union in 1995, the Outstanding Contributions in Geoscience Research award from the Department of Energy in 1996, and the Arthur L. Day Medal of the Geological Society of America in 2009. In 2021 Harrison was awarded the Walter Bucher medal of the American Geophysical Union, and in 2023 the Dodson Prize of the International standing Committee on Thermochronology.

He is a Fellow of the American Geophysical Union (1996), the Geochemical Society (2007), the European Association of Geochemistry (2007), and Geological Society of Australia (2007). He is member of both the Australian Academy of Science and the U.S. National Academy of Science and an Einstein Professor of the Chinese Academy of Sciences.

== Research interests ==
Harrison has published over 260 papers and books on a range of topics including the evolution of the Tibet-Himalaya orogenic system, geochemical kinetics, the origin and transport of magmas, geochronology, interpretive models for heat and mass flow, evolution of petroleum reservoirs and geothermal systems, and investigations of the very early Earth, including documenting the earliest evidence of oceans, continents, plate tectonics, and life. He is the co-author of the monograph Geochronology and Thermochronology by the ^{40}Ar/^{39}Ar Method (1999) and author of Hadean Earth (2020). His publications have attracted over 60,000 citations and correspond to an H-index value of 128.
