= William F. Foshag =

American geologist and mineralogist

- Born: March 17, 1894
- Died: May 21, 1956 (aged 62)
- Awards: Roebling Medal (1953)
- Scientific career
- Fields: Geology

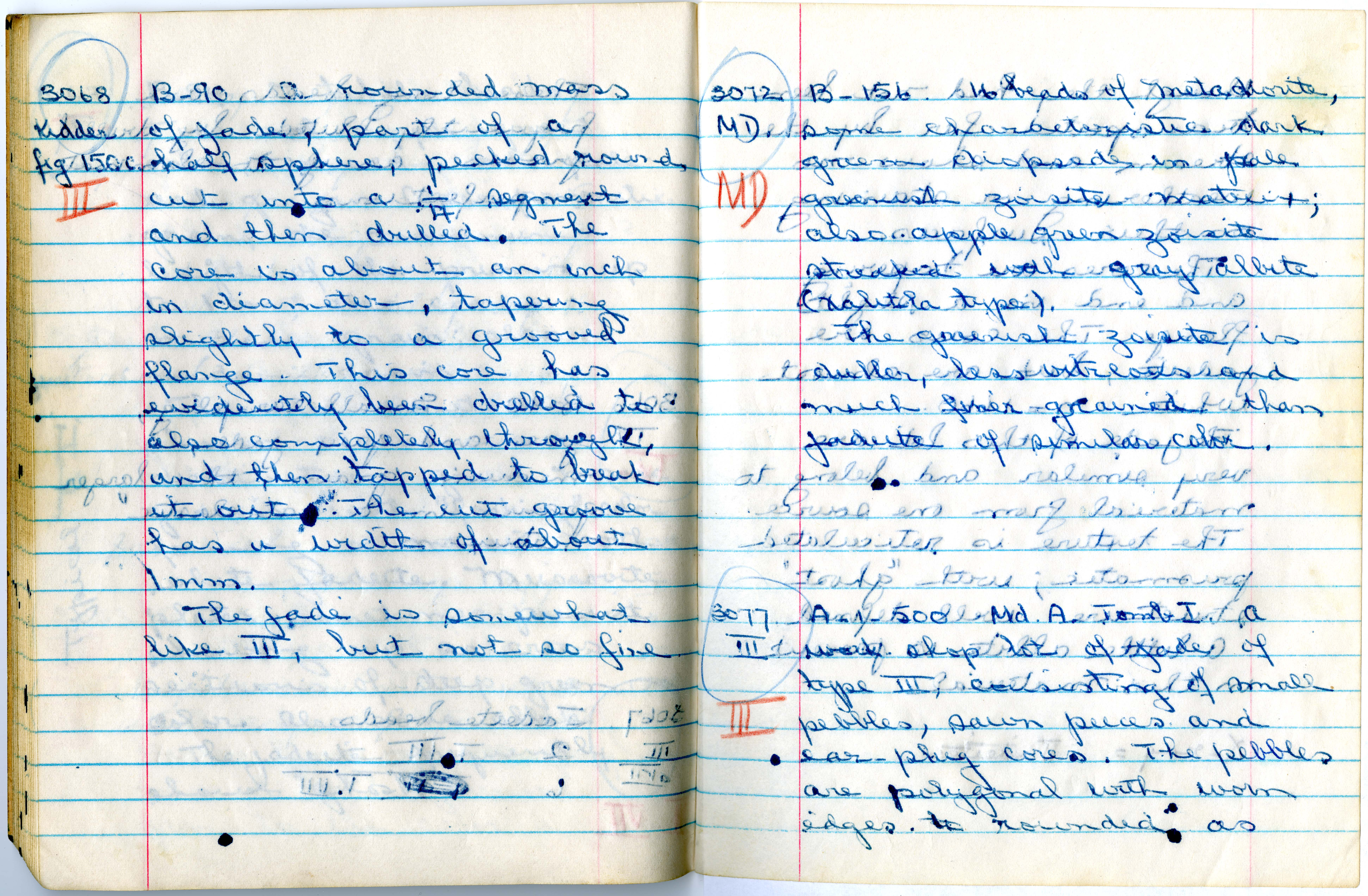
A page from Foshag's field book.

William Frederick Foshag (March 17, 1894 – May 21, 1956) was an American geologist and mineralogist. He published nearly 100 papers and described 13 new minerals, including foshagite.

== Biography ==
Foshag received his bachelor's degree from the University of California, Berkeley, in 1919 and then joined the U.S. National Museum, now called the National Museum of Natural History. After joining the National Museum he earned his Ph.D. in 1923 from U.C. Berkeley with the thesis The origin of the colemanite deposit of the western United States. As head curator of the museum's Department of Geology, Foshag greatly increased the museum's mineral collections and its collections of gemstones. During his tenure and in large part due to his efforts, the museum received both the Washington Roebling and Frederick Canfield mineral collections, which ranked among the world's best private collections of minerals and gems collections in the world—the Roebling collection had about 16,000 specimens. The Roebling and Canfield gifts included large endowments of money. From 1926 to 1941 Foshag's work in Mexico was largely funded by the Roebling Fund. Much of Foshag's fame stems from his study of the Parícutin volcano, which for the first time gave scientists an opportunity to study a volcano's entire "life cycle." Foshag was in Mexico in 1943 when the Parícutin volcano first appeared. He remained in Mexico for more than two years documenting the growth of Parícutin. In 1946 Foshag and Edward P. Henderson traveled to Japan to examine gemstones confiscated by the U.S. Army; the two experts spent more than four months there sorting and appraising gemstones, worth some $25 million in 1946 U.S. dollars. Foshag and Henderson met Mikimoto Kokichi in Japan. Based upon his discovery, in Guatemala's Motagua Valley, of the only in situ jadeitite locality south of the U.S. border, Foshag in 1949 was commissioned by the Guatemalan government to survey jade objects from pre-Columbian Central America.

For many years until his death in 1956, Foshag was the head curator of the National Museum's Department of Geology. He was survived by his wife, Merle Crisler Foshag (1899–1977), an artist who worked in the same department.

== Selected publications ==
- Larsen, Esper S.; Foshag, William F. (1921). "Merwinite, a new calcium magnesium orthosilicate from Crestmore, California" (PDF). American Mineralogist. 6 (10): 143–148.
- Foshag, William F. (1931). "Schairerite, a new mineral from Searles Lake, California" (PDF). American Mineralogist. 16 (4): 133–139.
- Foshag, William F. (1935). "Burkeite, a new mineral species from Searles Lake, California" (PDF). American Mineralogist. 20 (1): 50–56.
- Foshag, William F. (1941). "Problems in the study of meteorites" (PDF). American Mineralogist. 26 (3): 137–144.
- Foshag, William F. (1949). "Kokichi Mikimoto, cultured pearl czar". Gems & Gemology. 6 (Spring): 162.
- Foshag, William F. (1950). "The aqueous emanation from Paricutin volcano" (PDF). American Mineralogist. 35 (9 and 10): 749–755.
- Foshag, William F. (1954). "Acceptance of the Roebling Medal of The Mineralogical Society of America" (PDF). American Mineralogist. 39 (3 and 4): 296–299.
