= Planet Earth (1986 TV series) =

- Genre: Nature documentary
- Narrated by: Richard Kiley
- Composers: Jack Tillar and William Loose
- Country of origin: United States
- Original language: English
- No. of episodes: 7

Production
- Executive producer: Thomas Skinner
- Producer: Debbie Glovin
- Running time: 57 minutes (Total 399 minutes approx.)
- Production company: WQED Pittsburgh

Original release
- Network: PBS
- Release: January 22 – March 5, 1986

The cover of Planet Earth, the companion book to the series by Jonathan Weiner published in 1986.

Planet Earth is a seven-episode 1986 PBS television documentary series focusing on the Earth, narrated by Richard Kiley.

Planet Earth explores geoscience and how discoveries of the early and mid-1980s were revolutionizing mankind's understanding of the Earth's past, present, and future. It also highlights scientific discoveries not yet fully understood and still under study in the mid-1980s. The series explores the Earth's origins, history, and structure; the forces that operate continually to alter its surface; its oceans; its climate; its natural resources; its biosphere and the effects of life on the physical world; its relationship to the Sun and other bodies in the Solar System; and its possible future in the face of pressures the growing human population places on the natural world.

The BBC used the same title for its 2006 series, but the two series are completely unrelated and quite different in focus and content.

== Production ==
Produced by WQED in Pittsburgh, Pennsylvania, in association with the National Academy of Sciences as the centerpiece for a college-credit telecourse, Planet Earth was filmed over a period of four years on all seven continents and from the ocean bottom to earth orbit. The Annenberg/CPB Project and IBM funded production of the series. It enjoyed success in its original run, airing weekly on Thursday evenings on PBS from January 22 to March 5, 1986.

A companion book to the series written by Jonathan Weiner, also entitled Planet Earth, was published in 1986 by Bantam Books. Both the series and the companion book sometimes are marketed as Our Planet Earth in an attempt to avoid confusion with the 2006 BBC series Planet Earth.

Some footage shot for Planet Earth later also was used in the 1992 PBS series Earth Revealed.

== Critical reception and awards ==
In January 1986, Los Angeles Times critic Lee Margulies praised Planet Earth as "serious, but not dry" and credited it for its vivid filming of natural scenery, use of computer graphics, and achievement of depicting ongoing scientific research of the early and mid-1980s as "challenging, interesting, and worthwhile."

Planet Earth was the co-winner of the 1985-1986 Primetime Emmy Award for Outstanding Informational Series or Special, sharing it with Laurence Olivier - A Life, a multi-part biography of Laurence Olivier that aired on the PBS series Great Performances that season.

== Episode list ==
1. "The Living Machine" (aired January 22, 1986) – The episode discusses plate tectonics and geologic time, highlighting the work of James Hutton, Alfred Wegener, Harry Hess, Allan V. Cox, Brent Dalrymple, Frederick Vine, and Drummond Matthews, and discussing how geologists study layers of rock to read billions of years of the Earth's history. Topics covered include radiometric dating, seafloor spreading, magnetic field reversals, earthquakes, volcanism, subduction, and hotspots, how continents grow through accretion, how geophysicists study the interior of the Earth and what they have discovered, the theory of "microplate tectonics," how computer simulations have recreated the effects of continental drift on the world's geography over time from the prehistoric supercontinent Pangaea to the world of today, and how plate tectonics may have shaped the migratory behaviors of some animals. In addition to showing scientists studying the Kilauea volcano in Hawaii and using the research submarine Alvin to explore the Atlantic Ocean's Mid-Atlantic Ridge, the episode visits the Grand Canyon; Scotland's Arthur's Seat, Salisbury Crags, and Siccar Point; California's Owens Valley and San Andreas Fault; New Madrid, Missouri; and Ascension Island.
2. "The Blue Planet" (aired January 29, 1986) – The episode discusses major new revelations about the oceans. Topics covered include the movement of water in the ocean, such as ocean currents and eddy fields, and the effect of newly discovered ocean water dynamics on human activities such as yacht racing; the causes and effects of upwellings; the use of satellites to track plankton growth from space and the use of plankton maps created from such information to advise the crews of commercial fishing vessels on the best places to fish; the effect of the El Niño phenomenon on the world's weather; the discovery by scientists employing deep-sea research submersibles of previously unknown life forms living in the ocean's midwater zone; the use of sonar to make hydrographic surveys of the ocean bottom's topography; the study of cores of ocean bottom sediment to study the chemistry of, temperature of, and array of life present in the ocean in the past; and hydrothermal vents and the life that depends on them. The episode follows the first oceanographer in space, Paul Scully-Power, as he makes the first oceanographic reports ever made from space while aboard the Space Shuttle Challenger; visits the Gulf Stream, the National Center for Atmospheric Research in Boulder, Colorado, the waters of the Southern Ocean off Antarctica and the Antarctic Circumpolar Current, the Goddard Space Flight Center in Maryland, the National Marine Fisheries Service's Southwest Fisheries Center in San Diego, California, the Exxon Production Research Company in Houston, Texas, and Baffin Bay; and makes dives in a bathysphere into the ocean's midwater zone and with the United States Navy research submersible Sea Cliff to the bottom of the Pacific Ocean.
3. "The Climate Puzzle" (aired February 5, 1986) – The episode examines the complexities of the Earth's climate. It explains how life adapts to extremes in climate and how changes in the climate have doomed past civilizations; the use of lake sediments, stalagmites, and cores of the ocean bottom and of polar ice to detect and track ancient changes in the Earth's climate; the Little Ice Age and Louis Agassiz's work in discovering the ice ages; Milutin Milanković's ideas about how the Earth's motions can trigger changes in climate; the contrast between the climates of Venus, Earth, and Mars and the possibility of Earth's climate one day becoming like that of Venus or Mars; modern civilization's release of carbon dioxide into the atmosphere, carbon dioxide's role as a greenhouse gas, and the possible effects of global warming on sea levels, storm surges, droughts and desertification, famine, temperatures, and green plant growth; plate tectonics, seafloor spreading, subduction, continental drift, and the role of volcanism in atmospheric carbon dioxide levels; methane's role as a greenhouse gas and the influence of termites on atmospheric methane levels; computer modeling of the prehistoric atmosphere and the climates resulting from it as it changed over time; and the possibilities for Earth's future climate. The episode visits the dry valleys and ice rivers of Antarctica; the site of the Harappan Civilization in the Rajasthan Desert on the Indian subcontinent; northern New Zealand; Switzerland; Barbados; Columbia University in New York City; the Hudson Valley in New York; Vostok Station; the Institute of Glaciology in Grenoble, France; the Mauna Loa Observatory in Hawaii; Venice, Italy; the National Center for Atmospheric Research in Boulder, Colorado; and Colorado's Lake Pueblo State Park.
4. "Tales from Other Worlds" (aired February 12, 1986) – Using special effects and actual footage from space to illustrate other worlds in the Solar System, the episode discusses the connections between the Earth and the cosmos. Topics include the formation of the Solar System, the Earth, and the Moon; the formation of impact craters and how study of the Moon's surface helps us understand the early history of the Earth; the surface of Venus as it appears beneath the planet's acid rain clouds and what it tells us about the early Earth before the beginning of plate tectonics; the surface features of Mars, evidence that water once flowed there, and the possibility that life once existed there; how the planet Jupiter is actually a failed star and the features of its atmosphere; Jupiter's moons Callisto, Ganymede, and Europa, and the volcanoes of Jupiter's moon Io; Saturn, Uranus, Neptune, and the Oort Cloud; the theory that a large impact on the Earth caused the extinction of the dinosaurs; and the hypothesis that a hypothetical star dubbed "Nemesis" is responsible for a 26-million-year cycle of mass extinctions on Earth. The episode visits the Allan Hills of Antarctica; Meteor Crater in Arizona; the NASA Ames Research Center in San Francisco, California; the Arecibo Observatory in Arecibo, Puerto Rico; the Lowell Observatory in Flagstaff, Arizona; the Scablands of eastern Washington; stromatolites in Western Australia; a quarry in Utah; and the town of Gubbio, Italy; and discusses the work of Gene Shoemaker, Peter H. Schultz, Percival Lowell, Walter Alvarez, and Jack Sepkoski.
5. "Gifts from the Earth" (aired February 19, 1986) – The episode focuses on the Earth's natural resources, including minerals such as copper, gold, silver, and platinum; fossil fuels such as petroleum, coal, and peat; and soil. It examines how deposits of minerals and fossil fuels form; how soil forms, is eroded, and is distributed by the wind; river deltas; oil exploration and oil drilling; the development of an airborne imaging spectrometer aboard a C-130 Hercules aircraft; how scientists use studies of the Earth's mineral and energy sources to analyze the history of plate tectonic movement and continental drift, and how our understanding of plate tectonics has revolutionized the search for natural resources. The episode visits the Hillman Hall of Minerals and Gems at the Carnegie Museum of Natural History in Pittsburgh, Pennsylvania; ancient copper mining sites on Cyprus; the kuroko mines of Japan; deep-sea black smokers off the coast of Mexico in a dive aboard the research submersible Alvin; the Kid Creek Mine in northern Canada; the Bushveld Complex in South Africa; the University of Toronto in Toronto, Ontario, Canada; Hawaii; western Tennessee; Benares, the River Ganges, and the Ganges Delta in India; the Mississippi Delta in Louisiana; a cedar swamp in the process of forming a peat bog in Maine; offshore oil platforms in the Atlantic Ocean off the coast of Newfoundland; Sudan; the NASA Ames Research Center in San Francisco, California; the Jet Propulsion Laboratory in Pasadena, California; and the Cuprite Hills of Nevada.
6. "The Solar Sea" (aired February 26, 1986) – The episode explores the Earth's relationship with the Sun. It discusses ancient religious beliefs involving Sun worship; the disappearance of the Anasazi culture in what is now the Four Corners region of the western United States; the influence of the Sun on climate, weather, and ocean currents; sunspots, their causes and cycles, and the Maunder Minimum; how the use of carbon dating in the study of tree rings reveals the history of solar activity; a possible correlation between solar activity and droughts; how an investigation by geologists into a 700-million-to-800-million-year-old rock record of sun activity in an ancient lake bed demonstrates the consistency of solar activity patterns over time; early instruments for calculating the movements of the Sun and stars, such as sundials; early and modern telescopes; spectrums and the spectrograph; Fraunhofer lines; solar telescopes aboard Skylab; solar oscillations; the solar wind and its effect on the Earth's magnetosphere and magnetic field; the aurora borealis; solar flares and solar proton events; and the ozone layer and its importance in blocking the Sun's ultraviolet radiation. The episode visits Benares and the River Ganges in India; the pyramids of Egypt; the Mayan temple at Chichen Itza on Mexico's Yucatán Peninsula; Mesa Verde National Park in Colorado; the Hale Library in Pasadena, California; the University of Arizona in Tucson, Arizona; South Australia; Jaipur, India; Kitt Peak Observatory in Arizona; South Pole Station in Antarctica; Sacramento Peak Observatory in New Mexico; the Poker Flat Research Range in Alaska; and the Space Environment Service Center in Boulder, Colorado; and highlights the work of George Ellery Hale, Jack Eddy, Walter Maunder, Christopher Scheiner, Murray Mitchell, Galileo Galilei, and Isaac Newton.
7. "The Fate of the Earth" (aired March 5, 1986) – The episode explores the role of life in shaping the Earth and discusses the planet's possible future. It discusses the first hydrogen bomb test and the recovery of the environment from its effects; the Gaia hypothesis; the beginning of life on Earth and the possibility that it began in tide pools; the way the first cells may have formed; the discovery of the earliest fossil bacterium; stromatolites; the carbon cycle; how chitons can chew away entire islands while feeding; the destruction of rain forests, their pharmaceutical value, and a study of how much of a rain forest must be preserved to protect its species; the atomic bombing of Hiroshima, Japan, during World War II; how the aftereffects of a nuclear war could create a "nuclear winter;" the Lucky Dragon incident and the Nuclear Test Ban Treaty; the pressure human population increases are placing on the Earth; work to improve agricultural outputs to feed the growing human population; the use of satellite imagery to study world vegetation patterns and the expansion of the Sahara Desert; and humanity's future challenge of managing the world's resources both to meet civilization's increasing demand for energy and feed the growing world population while living in harmony with the Earth. The episode visits Eniwetok Atoll; Dedham, England; North Pole and Shark Bay in Western Australia; Kilauea in Hawaii; Palau; the Amazon Basin; the National Center for Atmospheric Research in Boulder, Colorado; India; the International Rice Research Institute in the Philippines; and the Goddard Space Flight Center in Maryland, and highlights the work of James Lovelock, Stanley Awramik, Michael McElroy, Thomas Lovejoy, Brian Toon, and Stephen Schneider.
