= John Verhoogen =

Belgian-American geologist and geophysicist (1912–1993)

John Verhoogen (born Jean Verhoogen, 1 February 1912, Brussels – 8 November 1993) was a Belgian-American geologist and geophysicist.

Verhoogen became ill at age 17 from poliomyelitis, which caused him problems throughout the rest of his life. Nevertheless, he studied mining at the University of Brussels (Ingénieur des Mines, degree 1933) and engineering geology at the University of Liège (Ingénieur-Géologue, degree 1934). He then went to the US, where he studied at the University of California, Berkeley under Howel Williams. In 1936 he received his doctorate in geology (with thesis Geology of Mt. St. Helens, Washington) from Stanford University, although most of the doctoral work was supervised by Williams at Berkeley. Verhoogen was then at the University of Brussels from 1936 to 1939. During the late 1930s and World War II, he was in the Belgian Congo, where he studied the volcano Nyamuragira and worked on the procurement of strategic mineral resources. From 1947 he was at the University of California, Berkeley, where he became a professor and remained until his retirement in 1976.

He was an early advocate of plate tectonics (according to his own words, because at Brussels his professor Paul Fourmarier was a vehement opponent of plate tectonics). In the 1950s, Verhoogen at Berkeley was responsible for the expansion of research in geochronology with isotopes and paleomagnetism. He was the coauthor of an influential textbook on petrology. He is known for the development of a theory of thermodynamics of the formation of rocks and application of thermodynamics on processes in the Earth's mantle and crust, establishing convection as the dominant mode of heat transfer.

In 1961 he calculated the latent heat release associated with inner-core solidification and concluded it would indeed drive thermal convection in the outer core and, furthermore, could be a source of energy for generating Earth's magnetic field through dynamo action in the electrically conducting fluid outer core.

Verhoogen was elected in 1956 a member of the National Academy of Sciences. He was a fellow of the American Academy of Arts and Sciences (elected 1970), the Royal Astronomical Society (elected 1950), the American Geophysical Union, and the Geological Society of America. In 1978 he received the Arthur L. Day Prize and Lectureship and in 1958 he received the Arthur L. Day Medal. He was twice a Guggenheim Fellow (academic years 1953-1954 and 1960–1961) and received the André Dumont Medal of the Belgian Geological Society. From 1951 to 1954 he was Vice President of the International Association of Volcanology and Chemistry of the Earth's Interior.

He was married to Ilse Goldschmidt, a native of Austria. He was predeceased by his wife and was survived by two sons, two daughters, and seven grandchildren. His doctoral students include Allan V. Cox and Richard Doell.

== Selected publications ==
- with Francis John Turner, Lionel E. Weiss, Clyde Wahrhaftig, and William S. Fyfe: The Earth: An Introduction to Physical Geology. Holt, Rinehart and Winston, 1970.
- with Francis John Turner: Igneous and Metamorphic Petrology. McGraw Hill 1951.
  - revised edition with Ian S. E. Carmichael and F. T. Turner: Igneous Petrology. 1974.
- Energetics of the Earth. Arthur L. Day Lecture, National Academy of Sciences Press 1980.
