= Richard L. Hay (geologist) =

American geologist (1926–2006)

Richard Hay
- Born: April 29, 1926; Goshen, Indiana, United States
- Died: February 10, 2006 (aged 79); Tucson, Arizona, United States
- Education: Northwestern University (MA); Princeton University (PhD)
- Occupations: Geologist and Professor of Geology
- Parent(s): Edward Hay; Angela

Richard LeRoy Hay (April 29, 1926 – February 10, 2006) was an American geologist whose most famous work was as the principal geologist working with Mary Leakey at Olduvai Gorge, the site of many important hominid finds in the study of human evolution. His scientific impacts went much further, however, including fundamental contributions to our understanding of the interactions of water, minerals, and organisms near the Earth's surface. He held the position of Professor of Geology at the University of California, Berkeley for 26 years (1957-1983) and at the University of Illinois for another 11. His life and scientific contributions were celebrated with a special session of the Geological Society of America at the national meeting in 2007.

== Early life and education ==
Hay was born in Goshen, Indiana, to parents Edward Hay, a dentist, and Angela Hay. He attended Northwestern University where he received a bachelor’s degree in 1946 and a master’s in 1948. He obtained a PhD from Princeton University in 1952.

== Academic career ==
In 1955, after serving two years in the U.S. Army Corps of Engineers, Hay began his career in academia when he joined the faculty at Louisiana State University in Baton Rouge as an assistant professor.

In 1957, he accepted a position as associate professor in the Geology department at the University of California, Berkeley, where he was soon advanced to full professor. The Berkeley Geology and Geophysics Department at the time included the world’s greatest concentration of distinguished petrographers, Professors Howel Williams, Francis Turner, and Charles Gilbert. Hay arrived at Berkeley around the time that the three faculty members had just published Petrography, which continues to be the unsurpassed book on the subject. Hay himself would become a top petrographer, a skill which would prove instrumental in much of his work.

In 1983, Hay was offered the prestigious Ralph Grim Professorship at the University of Illinois at Urbana-Champaign and he retired from Berkeley and moved to Illinois. He retired from the University of Illinois in 1997 and moved to Tucson, Arizona, where he established new colleagues at the University of Arizona and developed new interests in geology, participating in teaching seminars and continuing to mentor young scientists despite his retirement.

== Contributions to geology ==
Hay made many important and far-reaching contributions to the field of Geology including his work on the significance and interpretation of sedimentary zeolites, which he showed can reveal details about the environment in which the sedimentary rocks formed. Hay’s work also provided the definitive geological framework for two famous hominid-bearing sites in East Africa, Olduvai Gorge and Laetoli, and discovered the mega-replacement of Cambrian-Ordovician strata throughout the U.S. mid-continent by low-temperature potassium feldspar.

Hay’s work at Olduvai Gorge and the establishment of a detailed understanding of that complex stratigraphy took twelve years of field study. His geological knowledge and skill in sedimentary petrography were instrumental in this long-term endeavor, during which Hay was able to work out a complete geological history and paleogeography of the gorge area, analyzing sediments which were deposited over the last two million years. In his establishment of a chronology of the various sedimentary beds at Olduvai, it could be shown among other things, that there were multiple hominid taxa living contemporaneously at Olduvai. The resulting publication of his work at Olduvai, Geology of the Olduvai Gorge (1976) was a seminal study of the environment of early humans in East Africa and continues to be a foundational tool for scientists studying early human origins in East Africa.

== Honors ==
Hay was a Fellow of the American Association for the Advancement of Science, a Fellow of the Geological Society of America (GSA), and a Fellow of the California Academy of Sciences; he was recognized by each for his outstanding contributions to geology. Hay received both the Kirk Bryan Award in 1978 and the Rip Rapp Archaeological Geology Award in 2000 from GSA in recognition of his Geology of the Olduvai Gorge. In 2001, Hay also received the Leakey Prize, one of the most distinguished awards in the field of human origins.

The following is an excerpt from Hay’s acceptance speech for the Leakey Prize in 2001:

“My acquaintance with Olduvai began in 1961 with a look at rock samples which my colleague Garniss Curtis brought back for K-Ar dating. At that time I was interested in the zeolites of desert lakes, and these samples were loaded with zeolites. I was quick to accept an opportunity to go there in 1962. The main purpose was to work on the stratigraphy of Bed I and resolve some of the controversy over the age of Zinjanthropus, who had been given the almost unbelievable age of 1.75 million years. The stratigraphy of the gorge quickly proved to be an irresistible puzzle. I love puzzles, and this one took me 12 years to get most of the pieces in the right places. The zeolites were great fun and developed into a nice line of evidence about the paleoclimate. … I thank you very much for this honor today, and I wish all of you the same enjoyment in your work that … I experienced at Olduvai Gorge.”

== Death ==
He died of pulmonary fibrosis on February 10, 2006 at his home in Tucson, Arizona.
