= Richard Doell =

American geophysicist (1923–2008)

Roland Doell
- Born: 1923; Oakland, California, U.S.
- Died: March 6, 2008 (aged 84–85); Point Richmond, California, U.S.
- Education: UC Berkeley
- Awards: Vetlesen Prize (1970)
- Scientific career
- Fields: Geophysics
- Workplaces: U.S. Geological Survey; University of Toronto and MIT
- Doctoral advisor: John Verhoogen

Richard Doell (1923 – March 6, 2008) was an American geophysicist, known for developing the time scale for geomagnetic reversals with Allan V. Cox and Brent Dalrymple. This work was a major step in the development of plate tectonics. Doell shared the Vetlesen Prize with Cox and Dalrymple.

== Life and career ==
Doell was born in Oakland, California, U.S. in 1923, and grew up with his parents Raymond and Mable Doell in Carpinteria, California, U.S.

After serving for 2 years as a combat infantryman during World War II, he resumed his studies at UC Berkeley, where he earned his doctorate in geophysics in 1955. Following graduation, Richard held teaching positions at the University of Toronto and MIT. Richard joined the U.S. Geological Survey Geophysics Branch in Menlo Park, California, in 1955 where he specialized in research on the Earth’s magnetic field and remanent magnetization in rocks.

He was an integral member of a team that presented convincing evidence of periodic polarity reversals of earth’s main magnetic field by analyzing magnetization of rock samples collected from widely separated, geologically young, volcanic sequences. Furthermore, isotopic dating of the rock samples provided the first time scale of polarity epochs for the last 3.2 million years. The timed sequence of reversals, with subsequent refinements by this USGS team and others, proved to be a major component of the plate tectonics revolution in the mid-to late 1960s. It not only provided the basis for confirming the hypothesis of sea floor spreading, but it also was a technique for quantifying rates and amounts of crustal plate movements on a global scale. For his numerous unique pioneering scientific contributions and leadership, Richard Doell was elected to the United States National Academy of Sciences in 1969 and he shared the prestigious Vetlesen Prize with Allan V. Cox and G. Brent Dalrymple of the USGS and S. Keith Runcorn in 1971. Richard served as President of the American Geophysical Union’s section on Geomagnetism and Paleomagnetism from 1968 to 1970 and as Chief of the Geological Survey’s Branch of Theoretical Geophysics from 1967 to 1971.

In 1978, Richard retired from the USGS to pursue his passions for the new field of environmental studies, sailing, exploration, and photography. Having built a 38-foot sailboat, Muav, he began a series of long sailing cruises to Alaska, French Polynesia, and northern Europe. In 1984 he married Janet Hoare who joined him on those voyages.

Doell died in his sleep on March 6, 2008, at his home in Point Richmond, California.

== Publications ==
- "Measurement of the remanent magnetization of igneous rocks" with Allan V. Cox. U.S. Geological Survey Bulletin No. 1203-A (1965)
- "Computer program for a generic western coal region simulated model developed to investigate potential applications of system dynamics modeling to the EIS process," U.S. Geological Survey Open-File Report No. 78-321 (1978)
