= Jerry X. Mitrovica =

- Born: 1960 (age 65–66); Melbourne, Australia
- Education: University of Toronto (B.A.Sc. (Hons.), 1983); University of Toronto (M.Sc., 1985); University of Toronto (PhD, 1991)

Jerry X. Mitrovica is the Frank Baird Jr. Professor of Science in the Department of Earth and Planetary Sciences at Harvard University. He produced important early work showing that tectonic plates heave, tilt, and fall in addition to drifting across the surface of the planet. He is known for his work on modeling past and predicting future uneven rises and falls in sea level due to the interactions between melting ice caps, local gravitational forces, and plate tectonics, which yield what some might find to be counterintuitive results.

== Awards ==
In 2000 he was a recipient of a Rutherford Memorial Medal from the Royal Society of Canada. In 2007 he was awarded a Guggenheim Fellowship for his work on polar wander. In 2015 he earned the Arthur L. Day Medal from the Geological Society of America. In 2019 he was awarded the so-called "Genius Grant", a MacArthur Fellowship. He also earned the Kirk Bryan Award for the article, "Sea-level history during the Last Interglacial complex on San Nicolas Island, California: implications for glacial isostatic adjustment processes, paleozoogeography and tectonics".

- 2023 Arthur L. Day Prize and Lectureship

== Personal life ==
He was born to an ethnic Albanian father and a Greek mother.

== Select publications ==
- Daniel R. Muhs; Kathleen R. Simmons; R. Randall Schumann; Lindsey T. Groves; Jerry X. Mitrovica; DeAnna Laurel (March 2012). "Sea-level history during the Last Interglacial complex on San Nicolas Island, California: implications for glacial isostatic adjustment processes, paleozoogeography and tectonics". Quaternary Science Reviews. 37: 1–25. Bibcode:2012QSRv...37....1M. doi:10.1016/J.QUASCIREV.2012.01.010. ISSN 0277-3791. S2CID 129588268. Wikidata Q59799917.
- Peter U Clark; Arthur S Dyke; Jeremy D Shakun; et al. (7 August 2009). "The Last Glacial Maximum". Science. 325 (5941): 710–4. Bibcode:2009Sci...325..710C. doi:10.1126/SCIENCE.1172873. ISSN 0036-8075. PMID 19661421. Wikidata Q28254056.
- P.U. Clark; J.X. Mitrovica; G.A. Milne; M.E. Tamisiea (14 March 2002). "Sea-level fingerprinting as a direct test for the source of global meltwater pulse IA". Science. 295 (5564): 2438–2441. doi:10.1126/SCIENCE.1068797. ISSN 0036-8075. PMID 11896236. Wikidata Q34118671.
