= Sean Solomon =

American planetary scientist

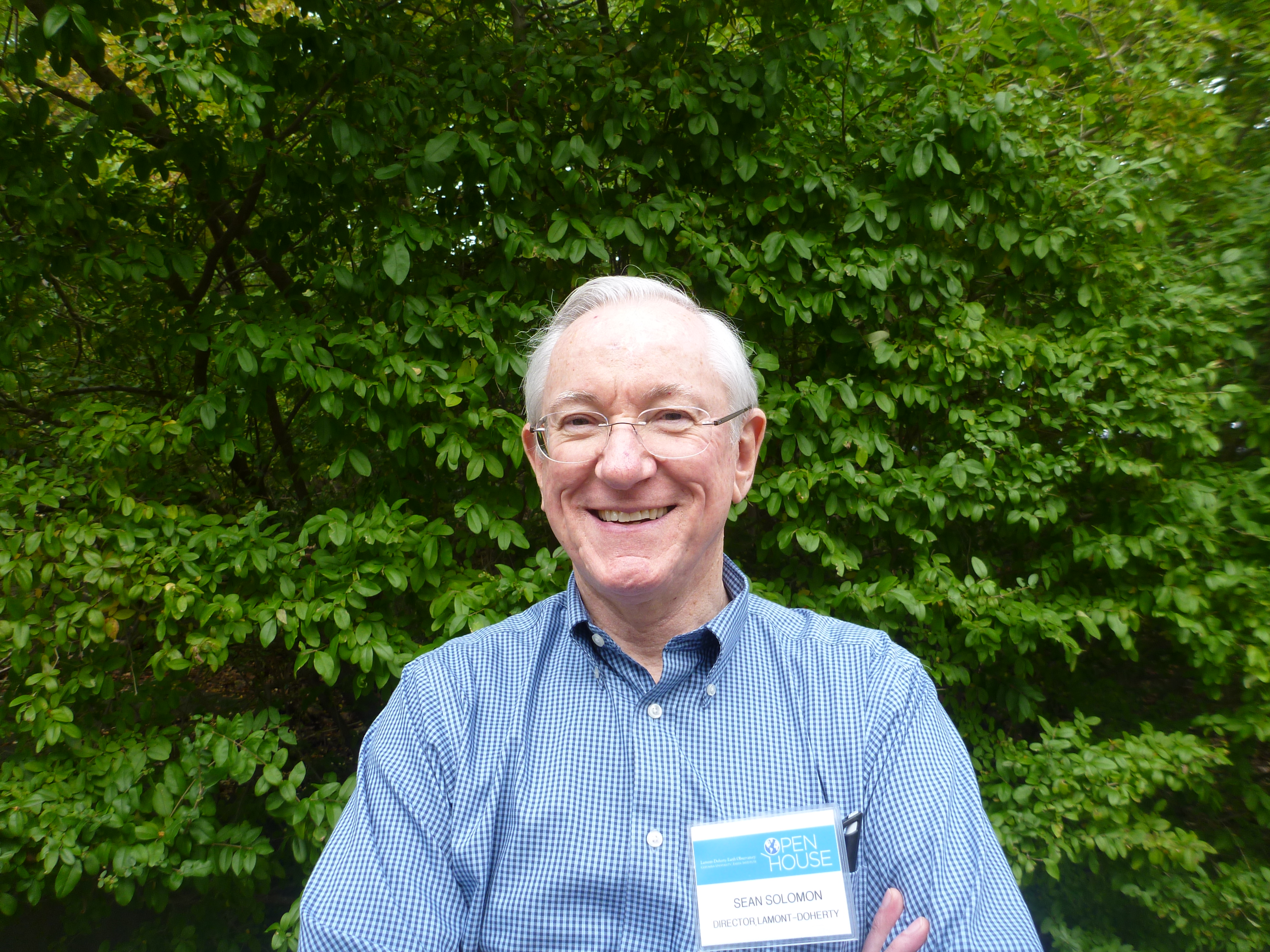
- Born: Sean Carl Solomon; October 24, 1945 (age 80); Los Angeles, California
- Education: California Institute of Technology (BS); Massachusetts Institute of Technology (PhD)
- Known for: Science lead for MESSENGER and director of the Department of Terrestrial Magnetism at the Carnegie Institution for Science
- Awards: G. K. Gilbert Award, Arthur L. Day Prize and Lectureship, National Medal of Science (2012)
- Scientific career
- Fields: Planetary science Geophysics
- Workplaces: Columbia University; Carnegie Institution
- Doctoral advisor: M. Nafi Toksöz

Sean Carl Solomon (born October 24, 1945) is an American geophysicist and planetary scientist who is currently a Doherty Senior Scholar at the Lamont–Doherty Earth Observatory of Columbia University, where he was also director and the William B. Ransford Professor of Earth and Planetary Science from 2012 to 2020. Before moving to Columbia in 2012, he was the director of the Department of Terrestrial Magnetism at the Carnegie Institution in Washington, D.C. His research area is in the fields of planetary geology, seismology, marine geophysics, and geodynamics. Solomon is the principal investigator on the NASA MESSENGER mission to Mercury. He is also a team member on the Gravity Recovery and Interior Laboratory mission and the Plume-Lithosphere Undersea Melt Experiment (PLUME).

== Education ==
Solomon was born in Los Angeles, California on October 24, 1945.

Solomon received his B.S. from the California Institute of Technology, and his Ph.D. in geophysics from the Massachusetts Institute of Technology (MIT) in 1971.

== Career ==
From 1972 through 1992 he was an assistant, associate, and full professor at MIT. For the next 20 years he was Director of the Department of Terrestrial Magnetism of the Carnegie Institution of Washington. He assumed his positions at Columbia in 2012. Solomon has served as Principal Investigator for the Carnegie Institution's part of the NASA Astrobiology Institute (NAI) and member of the Earth Institute External Advisory Board at Columbia University. He has been a member of the Magellan Project Science Team, Radar Investigation Group and the Mars Orbiter Laser Altimeter Team. He has been on numerous oceanographic expeditions. Solomon continues to serve on committees.

== Awards and honors ==
Solomon is the recipient of the 1999 G. K. Gilbert Award from the Geological Society of America and the Arthur L. Day Prize and Lectureship from the National Academy of Sciences also in 1999. He was president of the American Geophysical Union from 1996 to 1998. In 2005, Solomon was awarded the Harry H. Hess Medal by the American Geophysical Union. The medal is given for outstanding achievements on research on the evolution of Earth and other planets. He received the Distinguished Alumni Award from the California Institute of Technology in 2006. He was elected a Fellow of the American Academy of Arts and Sciences in 1995. In 2012, he was named a National Medal of Science laureate. In 2014, President Barack Obama presented Solomon with the National Medal of Science.
