= Earth Revealed: Introductory Geology =

- Title card
- Genre: Science documentary
- Directed by: Robert Lattanzio
- Presented by: James L. Sadd
- Narrated by: David Gilfillan
- Composer: Peter Davison
- Country of origin: United States
- Original language: English
- No. of episodes: 26

Production
- Executive producer: Sally V. Beaty
- Producers: Robert Lattanzio, Intelecom
- Running time: 30 minutes

Original release
- Network: PBS
- Release: February 1992 – August 1992

Earth Revealed: Introductory Geology, originally titled Earth Revealed, is a 26-part video instructional series covering the processes and properties of the physical Earth, with particular attention given to the scientific theories underlying geological principles. The telecourse was produced by Intelecom and the Southern California Consortium, was funded by the Annenberg/CPB Project, and first aired on PBS in 1992 with the title Earth Revealed. All 26 episodes are hosted by Dr. James L. Sadd, professor of environmental science at Occidental College in Los Angeles, California.

Some footage used in Earth Revealed previously had been seen in the 1986 PBS series Planet Earth.

== Episodes ==
=== Module I: Introduction (February 17–24, 1992) ===
1. "Down to Earth" – Beginning by comparing surface conditions on the planets Venus and Mars with the living landscapes of the Earth to highlight how unique the Earth is, the episode describes the goal of the study of geology and introduces major topics the series addresses, including the Earth's heat engines, plate tectonics, volcanism, earthquakes and seismology, erosion, and natural resources such as groundwater.
2. "The Restless Planet" – The episode discusses the development of astronomical theory, including the geocentrist views of astronomers in ancient Greece and the discoveries of Copernicus, Galileo Galilei, Johannes Kepler, and Isaac Newton. It also describes the formation of the Solar System and the physical evolution of the Earth over time, including its internal structure – through the process of planetary differentiation – and development and retention of an internal heat engine, its atmosphere, its hydrosphere, and the appearance of life.

=== Module II: Plate Tectonics: The Unifying Model (March 2, 1992-April 13, 1992) ===
3. "Earth's Interior" – The episode introduces geophysics, discussing how geophysicists study what lies beneath Earth's surface, using studies of seismic waves, variations in temperature, magnetic fields, gravity, and computer simulations to create models of structures deep in the earth. The episode also discusses paleomagnetism and the phenomenon of magnetic field reversals.
4. "The Sea Floor" – The episode explains how geologists study the sea bottom, using research submersibles and indirect methods, getting glimpses of volcanic activity; underwater formations such as the continental shelf, continental rise, slopes, canyons, abyssal plains, and mid-ocean ridges; and life forms that thrive at extreme depths in a world of intense pressure and total darkness. The episode examines subduction, seafloor spreading, hydrothermal vents, and the metallic resources found on the ocean bottom.
5. "The Birth of a Theory" – The episode examines the theory of plate tectonics and its development from its beginnings in the work of Alfred Wegener in the early 20th century through its maturation and acceptance in the 1960s. Topics covered include the prehistoric supercontinent Pangaea, continental drift, seafloor spreading, subduction trenches, paleomagnetism and magnetic field reversals, transform faults, and mantle convection.
6. "Plate Dynamics" – The episode examines the movement and interaction of tectonic plates and discusses the many geologic formations and phenomena that result from it, including faults, rift valleys, convergent plate boundaries, divergent plate boundaries, volcanism, subduction, and hotspots. It also discusses the lithosphere and asthenosphere and how they interact, mantle plumes, and the debate among geologists over what drives the motion of plates.
7. "Mountain Building and the Growth of Continents" – The episode discusses the process of orogeny (mountain building) and the role plate tectonics play in it, cratons and their formation, the growth of continents through accretion, the erosion of mountains, isostasy, how different types of rock form in the course of orogeny, and how rock types change over time through the rock cycle.
8. "Earth's Structures" – The episode explores rock layers, outcrops and geologic cross-sections, sedimentation and sedimentary layering, the principle of original horizontality, major structures of rocks – including fractures, joints, faults, folds, anticlines, synclines, and uncomformities – and the methods used to study them. It also examines tectonic force and the different types of stress involved in the formation of geologic structures and the deformation of rocks. Finally, it describes how geologic structures can trap petroleum, natural gas, and water and the resulting importance of the study of geologic structures in economic geology.
9. "Earthquakes" – The episode discusses the forces that create earthquakes, explaining faults, seismic waves, the transfer of energy from an earthquake's epicenter, the method of determining an epicenter's exact location, how seismic waves affect different buildings differently, and the histories of the seismograph and Richter scale. It also describes devices under development in 1992 to study earthquakes with an eventual goal of predicting them.

=== Module III: Geologic Time and Life (April 20–27, 1992) ===
10. "Geologic Time" – The episode describes the immensity of geologic time, the timeline of major geologic events in the Earth's history, the relationship between the geologic timeline and the history of life on Earth, and the use of fossils, radiocarbon dating, and uranium in radiometric dating to determine the age of rocks, fossils, and the Earth itself. The episode highlights the contributions of James Hutton and Ernest Rutherford and discusses unconformities, uniformitarianism, the law of superposition, the principle of original horizontality, cross-cutting relationships, relative age dating, and paleontology.
11. "Evolution Through Time" – The episode focuses on how the fossil record reveals the diversity and development of life on Earth, examining the traces left by single-celled prokaryotes and eukaryotes, early plants, animals, and the progression of life forms over time through the "Cambrian explosion" and the Paleozoic, Mesozoic, and Cenozoic eras, as well as the fossils found at the La Brea Tar Pits; and the theory of evolution. The episode discusses the connections between life on Earth and atmospheric gases, climate change, and the formation of rocks, as well as biological functions, mass extinctions, and the effects humans have had on the biosphere.

=== Module IV: The Rock Cycle (May 4, 1992-June 15, 1992) ===
12. "Minerals: The Materials of Earth" – The episode examines the variety of minerals, their atomic and crystalline structures, and their physical properties such as color, hardness, luster, cleavage, and streak. It also describes how petrologists section rocks and discusses hydrothermal solutions, the precipitation of metallic minerals, gems, precious metals, the formation and excavation of ores, and the value of silicates.
13. "Volcanism" – The episode describes volcanic processes, how tectonic plate boundaries are related to volcanism, and how volcanoes provide geologists with clues as to what is happening within the Earth. It also surveys the various types of volcanic eruptions, craters, cones, and vents, lava domes, magma, rift zones, volcanic rock, the relationship of volcanoes to ore deposits and geothermal energy, and the clues that volcanologists use to predict eruptions.
14. "Intrusive Igneous Rocks' – The episode examines the process in which magma seeps into crevices in existing rock and cools to form dikes of intrusive igneous rock without ever extruding onto the Earth's surface and how plate tectonics play a role in the process. It also discusses the formation and types of magma, xenoliths, batholiths, igneous differentiation, and how an understanding of igneous rock helps geologists understand the Earth's history. Geologists explain the types and textures of intrusive igneous rocks such as granite, obsidian, and quartz.
15. "Weathering and Soils" – This episode shows how weather, climate, chemicals, temperature, and type of substrate play a role in rock erosion and the formation of soil. It discusses mechanical and chemical weathering of rocks, rock exfoliation and fracturing, the acidification of rainwater and formation of acid rain, soil horizons, the Dust Bowl of the 1930s, the effect of irrigation on soils, windbreaks, and the importance of soil as a natural resource. It also shows how a soil conservation plan is developed and put into action at a farm in California's Mojave Desert.
16. "Mass Wasting" – The episode explains the phenomenon of mass wasting — the downslope movement of earth under the influence of gravity. It discusses various factors involved in mass wasting, including the rock's effective strength and pore spaces, and different types of mass wasting such as creep, slump, and landslides, as well as rockslides, debris flows, and mudflows. It explains the influence of slope angle, water and rain, and human activities such as the construction of buildings and roads, on mass wasting. It also explains how engineering geologists assess slope stability.
17. "Sedimentary Rocks: The Key to Past Environments" – The episode describes how exposed layers of sedimentary rock allow scientists to discern the Earth's geologic past, the movement of sediment and its deposition and how energy affects both transportation and deposition of sediments, how weathering and erosion influence the composition of sediments, sorting, sedimentary beds and cross-bedding, and the production of sedimentary rocks through the processes of lithification, compaction, and cementation. It also discusses organic components and the economic importance of sedimentary rocks.
18. "Metamorphic Rocks" – The episode describes how the weight of a mountain creates enough pressure to recrystallize rock, thus creating metamorphic rocks. It outlines the recrystallization process and the types of rock it can create, including claystone, slate, schist, and garnet-bearing gneiss, and it explains the relationship of metamorphic rock to plate tectonics. It also discusses protoliths, foliation, migmatites, contact metamorphism, and regional metamorphism.

=== Module V: Carving the Landscape (June 22, 1992-July 27, 1992) ===
19. "Running Water: Erosion and Deposition" – The episode discusses how rivers play a vital role in the sculpting of land. It shows landscapes formed by rivers, the various types of rivers, the basic parts of a river, and how the characteristics of rivers — their slope, channel, and discharge — erode and build the surrounding terrain. The episode also covers river bars, meanders, cut banks, aspects of flooding including floodplains, and the evolution of rivers.
20. "Running Water: Landscape Evolution" – The episode explains how rivers carve such features in the landscape as canyons, discussing erosion and deposition processes as they relate to river characteristics and type of rock. It also discusses base levels, peneplains, stream terraces, incised meanders, river deltas, stream rejuvenation, the evolution of rivers, and efforts to prevent consequences of river flow that are harmful to humans, such as flood control efforts on the Mississippi River.
21. "Groundwater" – The episode focuses on how most fresh water comes from underground, making groundwater an important natural resource. It discusses aquifers and aquicludes; rock porosity and permeability; effluence; artesian wells; the water table; the formation of caves, stalactites, and stalagmites; sinkholes; ways in which groundwater can become contaminated; how groundwater is recharged naturally; and the role of hydrogeology in groundwater management.
22. "Wind, Dust and Deserts" – The episode shows how deserts are defined by infrequent precipitation, where most deserts are located, and how desertification relates to proximity to the equator, proximity to mountains, and ultimately plate tectonics. It describes alluvial fans, interior drainage patterns of deserts, desert pavement, and desert varnish; examines how wind transports sand and creates dunes, dry lakes, blowouts, and oases; and addresses efforts to reduce desertification.
23. "Glaciers" – The episode discusses how glaciers shape the landscape, explaining the formation, structure, and movement of glaciers and how they gouge and accumulate earth and rocks. It also describes basal slip, the snow line, glacial striations, till, glacial landforms such as moraines, and how the study of glaciers may help us understand ice ages and the greenhouse effect.
24. "Waves, Beaches and Coasts" – The episode discusses the dynamic interaction of rocky landmasses and the energy of the ocean, describing the types, parts, sources of energy, movement, and impact on the shore of waves. It also covers shoreline characteristics, refraction, currents, sea barriers, tides, tsunamis, how dams affect beach erosion, how the greenhouse effect could affect sea level and coastal lands, and the role of geologists in protecting the coastline.

=== Module VI: Living With Earth (August 3–10, 1992) ===
25. "Living With Earth: The Loma Prieta Earthquake" – The episode uses the 1989 Loma Prieta earthquake in California as the starting point for a discussion of how humans are learning to cope with earthquakes, methods of studying earthquakes, and how various groups and agencies are studying the San Andreas Fault and the damage caused along its path during the Loma Prieta earthquake to better understand how earthquakes affect the land, buildings, and people. It also discusses aftershocks, liquefaction, scientific concerns about the Hayward Fault, the cause of most human casualties during earthquakes, and what can be done to limit casualties and property damage in the event of an earthquake.
26. "Living With Earth: Preserving the Legacy" – The episode discusses the impact on the Earth of the Industrial Revolution, as well as where petroleum comes from, how it is discovered and extracted, and how it is converted into energy, and the effects on the Earth of oil drilling and the burning of fossil fuels. It also examines the potential of alternative energy sources, including the pros and cons of, and problems related to, the exploitation of geothermal energy.
