= Allan V. Cox =

American geophysicist (1926–1987)

Allan Verne Cox
- Born: December 17, 1926; Santa Ana, California
- Died: January 27, 1987 (aged 60); Palo Alto, California
- Education: University of California Berkeley (PhD, 1959)
- Known for: Geomagnetic reversals
- Awards: Vetlesen Prize (1970); Arthur L. Day Medal (1975); John Adam Fleming Medal
- Scientific career
- Fields: Geomagnetism, rock magnetism
- Workplaces: US Geological Survey 1959–1962; Stanford University 1967–1987
- Doctoral advisor: John Verhoogen

Allan Verne Cox (December 17, 1926 – January 27, 1987) was an American geophysicist. His work on dating geomagnetic reversals, with Richard Doell and Brent Dalrymple, made a major contribution to the theory of plate tectonics. Allan Cox won numerous awards, including the prestigious Vetlesen Prize, and was the president of the American Geophysical Union. He was the author of over a hundred scientific papers, and the author or editor of two books on plate tectonics. On January 27, 1987, Cox died in an apparent suicide.

== Biography ==
Cox began studying chemistry at the University of California, Berkeley. However, after a single quarter he left school and spent three years in the United States Merchant Marine. He returned to Berkeley, but had so little interest in chemistry that his grades were too low to avoid being drafted into the United States Army. When he returned, he switched his major to geology. His research career in geology began in 1950 when he took a position as a field assistant to Clyde Wahrhaftig studying glaciation in the Alaska Range; the pair later had a long romantic relationship. For his graduate research at the University of California, Berkeley, Cox concentrated on rock magnetism with John Verhoogen as his supervisor. Verhoogen was one of the few geologists of the time who took the hypothesis of continental drift seriously. His stance made a deep impression on Cox.

After receiving his Ph.D. in 1959, Cox joined the United States Geological Survey in Menlo Park, California. There he collaborated with another geophysicist, Richard Doell, on rock magnetism. The two were particularly interested in geomagnetic reversals. At the time, very little was known about the timing of reversals. The rock specimens they collected were too young (a few millions of years) to date accurately until the potassium-argon dating method was developed. Cox and Doell arranged for the USGS to hire Brent Dalrymple, a graduate from Berkeley with expertise in this method. The three succeeded in creating the first geomagnetic polarity time scale. This work made possible the first test, by Frederick Vine and Drummond Matthews, of the seafloor spreading hypothesis.

Cox was hired as a professor at Stanford University in 1967. He became Dean of the School of Earth Sciences in 1979 and demonstrated a talent for administration that was widely acknowledged by his colleagues.

Cox died in a bicycle accident, colliding with a large redwood tree after falling off a cliff on Tunitas Creek road, in the mountains northwest of Stanford University. The San Mateo County coroner concluded that Cox's death was a suicide. Cox was normally very safety conscious and had exceptionally not worn a helmet on that day. Cox's death came five days after he learned he was going to be charged with child molestation. Cox allegedly had repeatedly molested the son of one of his graduate students. Cox had told the father of the molested child that he would kill himself if the allegations were reported to the police.

Two years after Cox's death, his longtime partner Clyde Wahrhaftig came out as gay during his acceptance speech for the Geological Society of America's Career Achievement Award, thus revealing Cox's sexuality as well. (Cox had remained closeted for his entire life.) Without directly mentioning the allegations against Cox at the time of his death, Wahrhaftig's speech implied Cox's suicide was the result of anti-gay prejudice, concluding, "I hope that, by making this revelation here, I contribute in some small way to the creation of a society with a sufficiently intelligent, open, and compassionate attitude toward sexuality that suicides such as Allan Cox's will be a thing of the past."

== Honors ==
Cox was elected to the United States National Academy of Sciences, the American Academy of Arts and Sciences, and the American Philosophical Society. In 1969 the American Geophysical Union awarded him the John Adam Fleming medal for research in geomagnetism;. In 1970 he was awarded the prestigious Vetlesen Prize, along with G. Brent Dalrymple, Richard Doell and S. Keith Runcorn, for contributions to geology and geophysics. In 1976 the Geological Society of America awarded him the Arthur L. Day Medal for the application of physics and chemistry to the solution of geologic problems. He was the president of the American Geophysical Union from 1978 to 1980. In 1984 the United States National Academy of Sciences awarded him the Arthur L. Day Prize and Lectureship.

After his death, a number of memorials to him were created. The American Geophysical Union had the annual Allan Cox Lecture from 1998 to 2001; this lecture was replaced by the Edward Bullard lecture. The Geological Society of America (Geophysics Division) selects a student each year for the Allan V. Cox Student Research Award; and Stanford University awards the Allan Cox Medal for Faculty Excellence Fostering Undergraduate Research.

== Works ==
=== Books ===
- Cox, Allan, ed. (1973). Plate tectonics and geomagnetic reversals. W. H. Freeman. ISBN 978-0-7167-0258-0.
- Cox, Allan; Hart, Robert Brian (1986). Plate Tectonics: How It Works. Wiley-Blackwell. ISBN 978-0-86542-313-8.

=== Selected scientific articles ===
- Cox, Allan V.; Doell, R. R. (1960). "Review of paleomagnetism". Geological Society of America Bulletin. 71 (6): 645–768. Bibcode:1960GSAB...71..645C. doi:10.1130/0016-7606(1960)71[645:ROP]2.0.CO;2.
- Cox, Allan V.; Doell, R. R. (1962). "Magnetic properties of basalt in hole EM 7, Mohole Project". Journal of Geophysical Research. 67 (10): 3997–4004. Bibcode:1962JGR....67.3997C. doi:10.1029/JZ067i010p03997.
- Doell, R. R.; Cox, Allan V. (1963). "The accuracy of the paleomagnetic method as evaluated from historic Hawaiian lava flows". Journal of Geophysical Research. 68 (7): 1997–2009. Bibcode:1963JGR....68.1997D. doi:10.1029/JZ068i007p01997.
- Cox, Allan V.; Dalrymple, G. B.; Doell, R. R. and (1963). "Geomagnetic polarity epochs and Pleistocene geochronometry". Nature. 198 (4885): 1049–1051. Bibcode:1963Natur.198.1049C. doi:10.1038/1981049a0. S2CID 4180105.
- Cox, Allan V.; Doell, R. R. (1964). "Long period variations of the geomagnetic field". Bulletin of the Seismological Society of America. 54B: 2243–70.
- Cox, Allan V.; Doell, R. R. and; Dalrymple, G. B. (1964). "Reversals of the earth's magnetic field—Recent paleomagnetic + geochronological data provide information on time + frequency of field reversals". Science. 144 (3626): 1537–1543. Bibcode:1964Sci...144.1537C. doi:10.1126/science.144.3626.1537. PMID 17741239.
- Cox, Allan V.; Doell, R. R.; Dalrymple, G. B. and (1965). "Potassium-argon age and paleomagnetism of the Bishop tuff, California". Geological Society of America Bulletin. 76 (6): 665–673. Bibcode:1965GSAB...76..665B. doi:10.1130/0016-7606(1965)76[665:paapot]2.0.co;2.
- Cox, Allan V.; Dalrymple, G. B. (1967). "Statistical analysis of geomagnetic reversal data and the precision of potassium-argon dating". Journal of Geophysical Research. 72 (10): 2603–2614. Bibcode:1967JGR....72.2603C. doi:10.1029/JZ072i010p02603.
- Cox, Allan V.; Dalrymple, G. B. and; Doell, R. R. (1967). "Reversals of the earth's magnetic field". Scientific American. 216 (2): 44–54. Bibcode:1967SciAm.216b..44C. doi:10.1038/scientificamerican0267-44.
- Cox, Allan V. (1968). "Lengths of geomagnetic polarity intervals". Journal of Geophysical Research. 73 (10): 3247–3260. Bibcode:1968JGR....73.3247C. doi:10.1029/JB073i010p03247.
- Cox, A. (1968). "Latitude dependence of the angular dispersion of the geomagnetic field". Geophysical Journal of the Royal Astronomical Society. 20 (3): 253–269. Bibcode:1970GeoJ...20..253C. doi:10.1111/j.1365-246X.1970.tb06069.x.
- Cox, Allan V. (1969). "Geomagnetic reversals". Science. 163 (3864): 237–2345. Bibcode:1969Sci...163..237C. doi:10.1126/science.163.3864.237. PMID 17790248.
- Marshall, Monte; Cox, Allan (1972). "Magnetic changes in pillow basalt due to sea floor weathering". Journal of Geophysical Research. 77 (32): 6459–6469. Bibcode:1972JGR....77.6459M. doi:10.1029/JB077i032p06459.
- Hillhouse, J.; Cox, Allan V. (1976). "Brunhes-Matuyama polarity transition". Earth and Planetary Science Letters. 29 (1): 51–64. Bibcode:1976E&PSL..29...51H. doi:10.1016/0012-821X(76)90025-X.
- Cox, Allan V.; Gordon, R. G. (1984). "Paleolatitudes determined from paleomagnetic data from vertical cores". Reviews of Geophysics and Space Physics. 22: 47–72. Bibcode:1984RvGSP..22...47C. doi:10.1029/RG022i001p00047.
- Gordon, R. G.; Cox, A; O'H.are, S. (1984). "Paleomagnetic Euler poles and the apparent polar wander and absolute motion of North America since the Carboniferous". Tectonics. 3 (5): 499–537. Bibcode:1984Tecto...3..499G. doi:10.1029/TC003i005p00499.
