= Dorothy J. Merritts =

American geologist

- Born: 1958 (age 67–68); Pennsylvania, USA
- Spouse(s): Russell T. O'Connor (m. 1981, divorced) Robert C. Walter (m. 2004)
- Awards: Kirk Bryan Award

Academic background
- Education: BA, Geology, 1980, Indiana University of Pennsylvania; MSc, Engineering Geology, 1983, Stanford University; Ph.D., geomorphology, 1987, University of Arizona
- Thesis: Geomorphic response to late Quaternary tectonism, coastal northern California, Mendocino triple junction region (1987)

Dorothy Jane Merritts (born 1958) is an American geologist. She is the Harry W. & Mary B. Huffnagle Professor of Geosciences at Franklin & Marshall College. In 2022, Merritts was elected a Member of the National Academy of Sciences.

== Early life and education ==
Merritts was born in 1958 to parents George and Mary Ann. She grew up in Pennsylvania where her grandfather was a conductor on the Pennsylvania Railroad. Following high school, Merritts obtained her Bachelor of Arts degree in geology at Indiana University of Pennsylvania in 1980 and enrolled at Stanford University for her Master's degree in Engineering Geology. She graduated magna cum laude from Stanford, while working at the US Geological Survey, then earned a doctorate degree in Geosciences, with foci in geomorphology, active tectonics, and soils, summa cum laude from the University of Arizona. Merritts completed her PhD with a dissertation fellowship from the National Science Foundation (NSF) from 1983 to 1987.

== Career ==
After earning her doctorate in geomorphology in 1987, Merritts joined the geosciences faculty at Franklin & Marshall College (F&M). In this role, she conducted research with support from the United States Geological Survey on earthquake hazards in California and other parts of the Pacific Rim, and studied groundwater resources, streams, and soil processes. She earned academic tenure in 1993 and then served on the National Research Council's Committee on Alluvial Fan Flooding. As a fully tenured professor, Merritts received a grant to develop instructional materials for undergraduate geosciences teachers to help them incorporate "inquiry-based learning into their classrooms." She was also part of a team of scholars who received a two-year NSF grant to develop a Web site that science faculty could use to help teach introductory courses. As a result of her work in the geosciences, Merritts was chosen to work as a consultant for the South Korean government to assess the possibility of active faults in the vicinity of nuclear power plants.

In 2003, Merritts and Robert C. Walter began studying streams in Lancaster County, Pennsylvania and nearby areas to determine why some had such high rates of stream bank erosion. They determined that mill dams which once existed throughout Pennsylvania, Maryland, and other mid-Atlantic states, had formed slackwater ponds that trapped sediment over a period of centuries. The streams with high banks and rates of erosion were at sites of recently failed mill dams, and sediment eroding from the banks was actually millpond sediment.

Between 2004 and 2005, Merritts served as the Flora Stone Mather Distinguished Professor at Case Western Reserve University. Upon returning to F&M in 2006, Merritts received the Association for Women Geoscientists Foundation Outstanding Educator Award. She continued to focus on the impacts of fault lines and earthquakes which led her to co-finding three new faultlines in San Francisco. Her research team named the new fault the Pacific Star Fault and the Pudding Creek Fault. Merritts then Chaired a National Academy of Sciences committee in 2007 to assess "Challenges and Opportunities in Earth Surface Processes." The results of that report led to new research on "the critical zone of intense interaction between surface processes and the solid Earth." She was also elected a fellow of the Geological Society of America. In 2008, Merritts and Walter co-published Natural Streams and the Legacy of Water-Powered Mills, which earned them the 2011 Kirk Bryan Award. Although the publication became quickly notable, it earned some critique for its generalizability. Some researchers critiqued the research for implying that their findings could be applied widely throughout the eastern United States.

As a result of their collaborative efforts, Merritts and Walter helped establish the Chesapeake Watershed Initiative at F&M. The aim of the initiative was to achieve "significant, far-reaching outcomes for stewardship and restoration in the vast watershed, through applied research and knowledge generation, education, and outreach." In 2022, Merritts was elected a Member of the National Academy of Sciences.

== Personal life ==
Merritts obtained a marriage license with Robert C. Walter in 2004. She had previously been married to Russell T. O'Connor from 1981 to 2003.

== Selected publications ==
- Environmental Geology: An Earth System Science Approach
