= Vetlesen Prize =

American geology award

The Vetlesen Prize is a prize in geology awarded jointly by Columbia University's Lamont–Doherty Earth Observatory and the G. Unger Vetlesen Foundation. The prize is generally regarded as the highest distinction in geologic studies, and the "Nobel Prize for geology".

== Background ==
The Vetlesen Prize has been described as an attempt to establish an equivalent of a Nobel Prize for geophysics or geology. The prize is awarded for scientific achievement resulting in a clearer understanding of the Earth, its history, or its relations to the universe. The prize was established in 1959 and is awarded on average once every two years, if the jury selects at least one worthy candidate during this period.

== History ==
G. Unger Vetlesen established the foundation which bears his name shortly before his death in 1955. In addition to the Vetlesen Prize, the foundation provides support in the Earth sciences for institutions of excellence. The prize is awarded for scientific achievement resulting in a clearer understanding of the Earth, its history, or its relations to the universe. The prize is awarded on average once every two years, if the jury selects at least one worthy candidate during this period.

== Past recipients ==
- 2023 - David L. Kohlstedt, USA
- 2020 - Anny Cazenave, France
- 2017 - Mark Cane, USA; S. George Philander, USA
- 2015 - Robert Stephen John Sparks, United Kingdom
- 2012 - Susan Solomon, USA; Jean Jouzel, France
- 2008 - Walter Alvarez, USA
- 2004 - Sir Nicholas Shackleton, United Kingdom : W. Richard Peltier, Canada
- 2000 - W. Jason Morgan, USA; Walter C. Pitman III, USA; Lynn Sykes, USA
- 1996 - Robert E. Dickinson, USA; John Imbrie, USA
- 1993 - Walter Munk, USA
- 1987 - Wallace S. Broecker, USA; Harmon Craig, USA
- 1981 - Marion King Hubbert, USA
- 1978 - J. Tuzo Wilson, Canada
- 1974 - Chaim Leib Pekeris, Israel
- 1973 - William A. Fowler, USA
- 1970 - Allan V. Cox, USA
- 1970 - Richard R. Doell, USA; S. Keith Runcorn, United Kingdom
- 1968 - Francis Birch, USA; Sir Edward Bullard, United Kingdom
- 1966 - Jan Hendrik Oort, Netherlands
- 1964 - Pentti Eskola, Finland
- 1964 - Arthur Holmes, United Kingdom
- 1962 - Sir Harold Jeffreys, United Kingdom
- 1962 - Felix Andries Vening Meinesz, Netherlands
- 1960 - W. Maurice Ewing, USA

== See also ==
- List of geology awards
- List of geophysics awards
