= Charles Repenning =

American paleontologist

- Born: August 4, 1922; Oak Park, Illinois
- Died: January 5, 2005 (aged 82); Lakewood, Colorado
- Known for: Paleoparadoxia
- Awards: Bronze Star; Purple Heart; 2007 Kirk Bryan Award of the Geological Society of America
- Scientific career
- Fields: Paleontology; Zoology
- Workplaces: United States Geological Survey

Charles Albert Repenning (August 4, 1922 in Oak Park, Illinois – January 5, 2005 in Lakewood, Colorado) was an American paleontologist and zoologist noted for his work on shrews, fossil rodents, modern pinnipeds and their extinct relatives, the Desmostylia. He identified and researched the Paleoparadoxia found during the excavation of Stanford Linear Accelerator at Stanford University in California, which was eventually reclassified as a distinct species, which was named in his honor. Repenning was the first paleontologist to identify fossils from the North Slope of Alaska as dinosaur bones.

== Military service ==
He was a veteran of World War II, serving as an enlisted soldier in the 104th Infantry Division and spent time in a German prisoner-of-war camp. He was awarded the Bronze Star and Purple Heart.

== Education and career ==
After the war, Repenning attended the New Mexico School of Mines and worked for the United States Geological Survey in Holbrook, Arizona, where he mapped the Navajo Reservation; Menlo Park, California, where he studied at the University of California at Berkeley; and eventually Denver, Colorado, writing extensively on fossil and modern day mammals of many types, culminating in his work to create a bio-chronology based on microtine rodents.

== Private life ==
Repenning was known as a story teller and always began his childhood stories with 'When I was a little girl...'. He once found a guy sitting on the top of a hill in the desert who turned out to be a Civil War soldier who had desiccated rather than decayed. He was also a source of entertainment to his neighbors on more than one occasion. He would occasionally bury zebra, elephant, and tiger carcasses in the back yard in order to study their bones. His children referred to the back half of their yard as "The Bone Yard." Once he handed out elephant toenails to the neighborhood children as a curiosity. Repenning would also prop up frozen animals that he was studying (e.g. an Emu) in the front yard for children to see as they walked to school in the morning.

The Repennings had unconventional pets at times as well. Repenning kept a raven that could talk, a skunk, a raccoon, a chimpanzee (only on summers), and for a short time a bobcat.

Repenning lived in a way that was uncommon and larger than life at times. The people that remember him often have remarkable stories about him to tell. However, Repenning, by his own account didn't really consider his life remarkable in any way. He was a man of many different sides.

== Death ==
Repenning was found murdered in his home in Lakewood on January 5, 2005. Meth addicts Richard Kasparson and Michael Wessel killed Repenning during a burglary. Wessel was sentenced to life in prison without the possibility of parole plus 54 years. Ginny Kasparson pleaded guilty to accessory to murder. She was sentenced to 16 years in prison on May 19, 2006. Nicholas Savajian pleaded guilty to second degree murder. On May 5, 2006, Michael Mapps, accused of masterminding the crime, was found guilty.
