= Arthur L. Day Prize and Lectureship =

The Arthur L. Day Prize and Lectureship is awarded by the U.S. National Academy of Sciences "to a scientist making new contributions to the physics of the Earth whose four to six lectures would prove a solid, timely, and useful addition to the knowledge and literature in the field." The prize was established by the physicist Arthur L. Day.

== Recipients ==
- 2026: Roland Bürgmann - (His) work has transformed our understanding of how the lower crust and upper mantle respond to large stress changes from earthquakes.
- 2023: Jerry X. Mitrovica - For his work on enhancing our comprehension of the intricate connection between sea level rise and ice sheet melting, as well as the effects on both historical and contemporary human communities.
- 2020: Linda T. Elkins-Tanton - For her work that combines geodynamic modeling, petrology, geochemistry and field investigations to provide first-order constraints and fundamental insights into planetary chemical differentiation processes.
- 2017: Susan Solomon - For her work in understanding atmospheric chemistry related to stratospheric ozone depletion and for her leadership in communicating climate change science.
- 2014: Richard Alley - For his studies of the flow of ice sheets and ice streams
- 2011: R. Lawrence Edwards - For innovative use of U-Th and stable isotope systems to discover and quantify abrupt 30-500 ka temperature excursions and their timings attending Milankovitch cycle-induced global climate changes.
- 2008: Stanley R. Hart - For development of the new field of "chemical geodynamics" through the use of the chemical and isotopic signature of mantle-derived samples to map and constrain the dynamical evolution of the Earth's interior.
- 2005: Herbert E. Huppert - For fundamental research into the fluid mechanics of natural and multiphase flows and for pioneering the field of geological fluid mechanics.
- 2002: Wallace Smith Broecker - For his uniquely evocative, creative voice that has fundamentally changed the way we think about the role of oceans in the climate system.
- 1999: Sean C. Solomon - For his analysis of seismological data constraining the tectonics of the earth's lithosphere, and for his development of global tectonic models of the moon and terrestrial planets.
- 1996: James G. Anderson - For his pioneering work on the study of the abundance and chemical physics of radicals in the stratosphere and the effects of human influence on the ozone layer.
- 1993: Hiroo Kanamori - For his outstanding contributions to the fundamental physics of the earthquake source process and to its application to earthquake prediction and mitigation of seismic risks.
- 1990: Ho-kwang Mao - For his measurement of fundamental properties of elements and minerals under extreme conditions and development of the diamond cell to megabar pressures, thereby increasing our knowledge of planetary interiors.
- 1987: Harmon Craig - For the masterful use of the isotopes of the elements from hydrogen through oxygen in attacking problems of cosmochemistry, mantle geochemistry, oceanography, and climatology.
- 1984: Allan V. Cox - For his development of the geomagnetic-reversal time scale.
- 1981: G. J. Wasserburg - For his work in the use of isotopes in studying geophysical problems of the solar system, ranging from the early solar nebula to rock formation on the moon and in the earth's mantle.
- 1978: John Verhoogen - For his fundamental work on the thermodynamics of the earth's core and mantle, and his contributions to scholarship in the earth's sciences.
- 1975: Drummond H. Matthews and Fred J. Vine - For their discovery that the stripes in oceanic magnetic anomaly patterns are a datable record of the history of sea-floor spreading and continental drift, thus making one of the major contributions to the revolution in earth sciences now known as plate tectonics.
- 1972: Hatten S. Yoder, Jr. - For his work on mineral systems under extreme conditions of pressure and temperature.

== See also ==
- List of geology awards
