= Frank Turner (geologist) =

New Zealand geologist

- Born: 10 April 1904
- Died: 21 December 1985 (aged 81)
- Education: Auckland University College; University of New Zealand
- Known for: work in petrology
- Notable work: Mineralogical and Structural Evolution of Metamorphic Rocks; Igneous and Metamorphic Petrology
- Scientific career
- Fields: geology
- Workplaces: University of Otago; University of California, Berkeley

Francis John Turner (10 April 1904 – 21 December 1985) was a New Zealand geologist. He received his BSc and MSc from the Auckland University College. He worked with the New Zealand Geological Survey and in 1926 he became a geology lecturer in the University of Otago.

At Otago he became interested in metamorphism and studied the unexplored metamorphic rocks of South Island on which he earned his PhD in 1934 from the University of New Zealand. His application and expansion of Pentti Eskola's concept of metamorphic facies led to his publication of Mineralogical and Structural Evolution of Metamorphic Rocks, the book that established his position in the field of petrology and was a great influence on a generation of geologists.

In 1946 he accepted a position at the University of California, Berkeley. At Berkeley he gained insight into experimental studies of petrology and geochemistry. He later collaborated with John Verhoogen on the classic work Igneous and Metamorphic Petrology published in 1960. He authored eighty technical papers and six textbooks on metamorphic, igneous, and structural petrology. He retired from Berkeley in 1971.
