= Kirk Bryan Award =

Award from the Geological Society of America

The Kirk Bryan Award is the annual award of the Quaternary Geology and Geomorphology Division of the Geological Society of America. It is named after Kirk Bryan, a pioneer in geomorphology of arid regions. The award was established in 1951 and is bestowed upon the author or authors of a published paper of distinction advancing the science of geomorphology or some related field.

== List of recipients ==
- 2025 Alan Nelson, Christopher B. DuRoss, Robert C. Witter, Harvey M. Kelsey, Simon E. Engelhart, Shannon A. Mahan, Harrison J. Gray, Andrea D. Hawkes, Benjamin P. Horton, Jason S. Padgett
- 2024 Evan Dethier, Carl E. Renshaw, Francis Magilligan
- 2023 Simon L. Pendleton, Gifford H. Miller, Nathaniel Lifton, Scott J. Lehman, John Southon, Sarah E. Crump, and Robert S. Anderson
- 2022 Timothy Beach, Sheryl Luzzadder-Beach, Samantha Krause, Tom Guderjan, Fred Valdez Jr, Juan Carlos Fernandez-Diaz, Sara Eshleman, and Colin Doyle
- 2021 Maureen H. Walczak, Alan C. Mix, Ellen A. Cowan, Stewart Fallon, L. Keith Fifield, Jay R. Alder, Jianghui Du, Brian Haley, Tim Hobern, June Padman, Summer K. Praetorius, Andreas Schmittner, Joseph S. Stoner, and Sarah D. Zellers
- 2020 Martha Cary "Missy" Eppes and Russ Keanini
- 2018 Karen B Gran, Noah Finnegan, Andrea L. Johnson, Patrick Belmont, Chad Wittkop
- 2017 Les McFadden
- 2016 Chris Goldfinger, C. Hans Nelson, Ann E. Morey, Joel E. Johnson, Jason R. Patton, Eugene Karabanov, Julia Gutiérrez-Pastor, Andrew T. Eriksson, Eulàlia Gràcia, Gita Dunhill, Randolph J. Enkin, Audrey Dallimore, and Tracy Vallier
- 2015 Daniel Muhs, Kathleen Simmons, Randall Schumann, Lindsey Groves, Jerry Mitrovica, DeAnna Laurel
- 2014 John C. Ridge, Greg Balco, Robert L. Bayless, Catherine C. Beck, Laura B. Carter, Jody L. Dean, Emily B. Voytek and Jeremy H. Wei
- 2013 P.K. House, P.A. Pearthree, and M.E. Perkins
- 2012 Neal R. Iverson, Thomas S. Hooyer, Jason F. Thomason, Matt Graesch, and Jacqueline R. Shumway
- 2011 Robert C. Walter and Dorothy J. Merritts
- 2010 Rolfe D. Mandel
- 2009 Ellen Wohl
- 2008 Jon J. Major
- 2007 Marith Cady Reheis, A.M. Sarna-Wojcicki, R.L. Reynolds, C.A. Repenning, and M.D. Mifflin
- 2006 David R. Montgomery
- 2005 John C. Gosse and Fred M. Phillips
- 2004 Stephen C. Porter
- 2003 Michael R. Waters, and C. Vance Haynes
- 2002 Frank J. Pazzaglia and Mark T. Brandon
- 2001 Richard M. Iverson
- 2000 Brian Atwater and Eileen Hemphill-Haley
- 1999 William L. Graf
- 1998 Vance T. Holliday
- 1997 Grant A. Meyer, Stephen G. Wells, and A.J. Timothy Jull
- 1996 Roger T. Saucier
- 1995 James E. O'Connor
- 1994 Arthur N. Palmer
- 1993 William B. Bull
- 1992 R. Dale Guthrie
- 1991 Milan J. Pavich
- 1990 Arthur S. Dyke and Victor K. Prest
- 1989 Kevin M. Scott
- 1988 Peter W. Birkeland
- 1987 Richard B. Waitt
- 1986 Ronald I. Dorn and Theodore M. Oberlander
- 1985 No award given
- 1984 Steven M. Colman
- 1983 Leland H. Gile, John W. Hawley, Robert B. Grossman
- 1982 Kenneth L. Pierce
- 1981 J. Ross Mackay
- 1980 James A. Clark, William E. Farrell, and W. Richard Peltier
- 1979 Stanley A. Schumm
- 1978 Richard L. Hay
- 1977 Michael A. Church
- 1976 Geoffrey S. Boulton
- 1975 James B. Benedict
- 1974 Robert V. Ruhe
- 1973 John T. Andrews
- 1972 Dwight R. Crandell
- 1971 A. Lincoln Washburn
- 1970 Harold E. Malde
- 1969 Ronald L. Shreve
- 1968 David M. Hopkins
- 1967 Clyde A. Wahrhaftig
- 1966 Charles S. Denny
- 1965 Gerald M. Richmond
- 1964 Robert P. Sharp
- 1963 Arthur H. Lachenbruch
- 1962 Anders Rapp
- 1961 John T. Hack
- 1960 John F. Nye
- 1959 Jack L. Hough
- 1958 Luna B. Leopold and Thomas J. Maddock Jr.

== See also ==
- List of geology awards
- Prizes named after people
