= Brent Dalrymple =

American geologist (born 1937)

Gary Brent Dalrymple
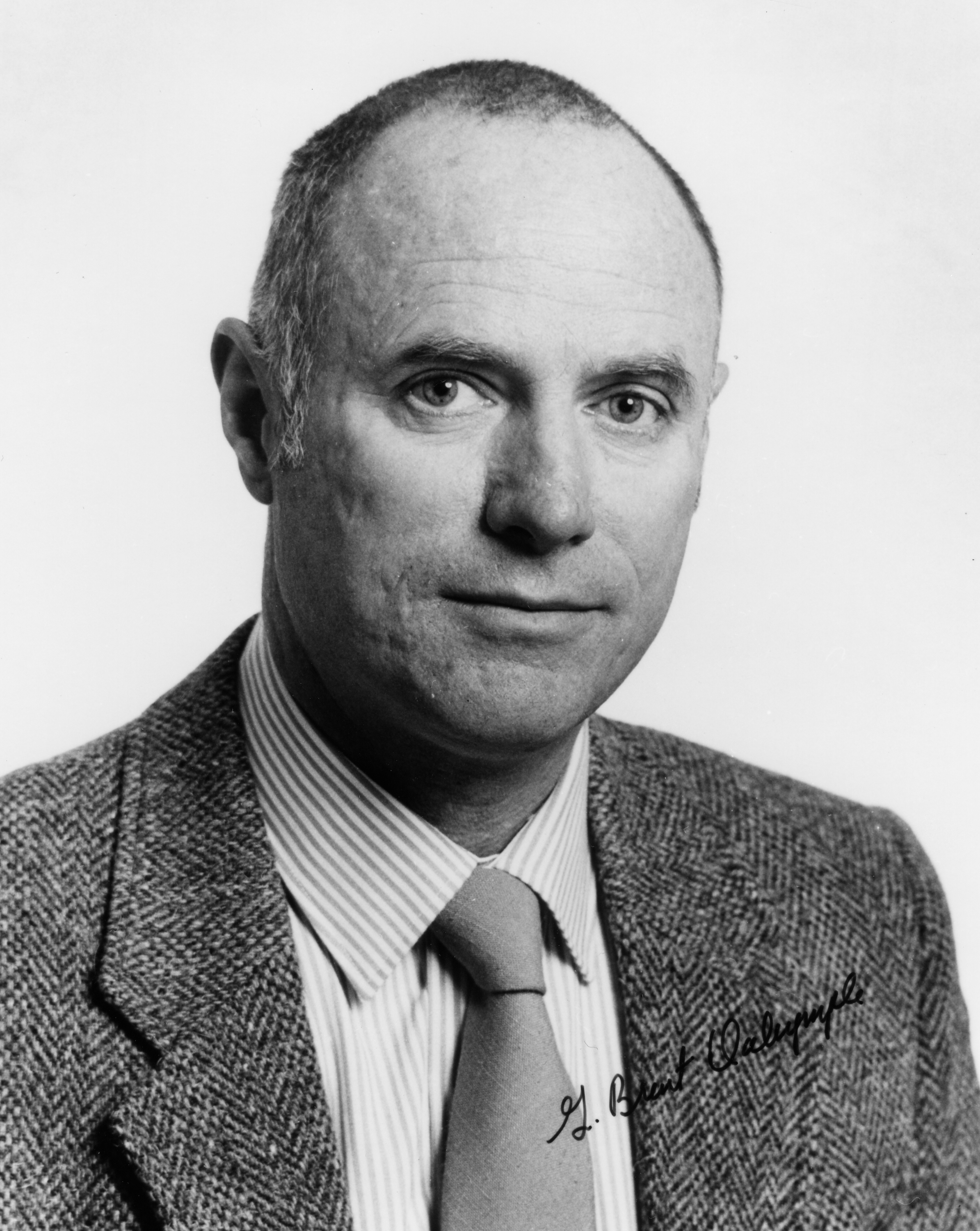
- Born: May 9, 1937 (age 89); Alhambra, California
- Known for: Research regarding the history of Earth's magnetic field and radiometric dating
- Spouse: Sharon
- Scientific career
- Fields: Geology
- Thesis: Potassium-argon dates and the Cenozoic chronology of the Sierra Nevada, California (1963)

Gary Brent Dalrymple (born May 9, 1937) is an American geologist, author of The Age of the Earth and Ancient Earth, Ancient Skies, and National Medal of Science winner.

He was born in Alhambra, California. After receiving a Ph.D. from University of California, Berkeley, Dalrymple went to work at the U.S. Geological Survey (USGS) in Menlo Park, California. In 1994 he left the USGS to accept a position at Oregon State University, where he served on the faculty until retiring in 2001. He is a member of the National Academy of Sciences.

In 1992, Dalrymple was elected to be a member of the American Academy of Arts and Sciences in the area of mathematical and physical sciences.

In 2003, Dalrymple was awarded the National Medal of Science. He was presented with the Medal at a ceremony in 2005.

Since 2013, Dalrymple has been listed on the Advisory Council of the National Center for Science Education.

== Selected publications ==
- Dalrymple, Brent (1994). The Age of the Earth. Stanford University Press. ISBN 0-8047-2331-1.
- Dalrymple, Brent (2004). Ancient Earth, ancient skies: the age of Earth and its cosmic surroundings. Stanford University Press. ISBN 0-8047-4933-7.
- Allan, Cox; Doell, Richard R.; Dalrymple, G. Brent (June 15, 1963). "Geomagnetic Polarity Epochs and Pleistocene Geochronometry". Nature. 198 (4885): 1049–1051. Bibcode:1963Natur.198.1049C. doi:10.1038/1981049a0. S2CID 4180105.

== Sources ==
- American Geophysical Union (includes photo)
