= Clyde Wahrhaftig =

American geologist (1919–1994)

- Born: Clyde A. Wahrhaftig; December 1, 1919; Fresno, California, United States
- Died: April 6, 1994 (aged 74); San Francisco, California, United States
- Education: Caltech (Bachelors degree), Harvard University (PhD)
- Awards: Kirk Bryan Award, Geological Society of America Distinguished Career Award
- Scientific career
- Fields: Geology, Geomorphology
- Workplaces: US Geological Survey 1941–1994; University of California Berkeley 1960–1982

Clyde A. Wahrhaftig (December 1, 1919 – April 6, 1994) was an American geologist who worked for the United States Geological Survey and taught at the University of California at Berkeley. His research areas included Alaska, the Sierra Nevada, and the California Coast Ranges. He is also known for his field guides to the geology of San Francisco and the Bay Area.

== Biography ==
Wahrhaftig was born and raised in Fresno, California. He earned a bachelor's degree in geology at Caltech in 1941, and a Ph.D. in geology at Harvard in 1953. He worked for the US Geological Survey (USGS) as a field geologist from 1941 until his death; the bulk of his USGS work was in Alaska. Starting in 1960, he also taught in the Department of Geology and Geophysics at the University of California, Berkeley. During his tenure at Berkeley, he started his researches in the Sierra Nevada. When heart issues began to affect his physical activities in the mid-1980s, he shifted his research to the nearby California coast range. His interest in environmental issues led to him taking the position of Chair and Director of the new Environmental Sciences interdepartmental undergraduate major in 1975. He retired from UC Berkeley in 1982.

In the late 1960s, Wahrhaftig took an active role in trying to get minority and female students active in the earth sciences. He was also active in environmentally-based community projects, working extensively in the Bolinas and Tomales Bay areas

Wahrhaftig was a dedicated user of public transportation, partially motivated by his concern about the environment impact of fossil fuels. He eschewed automobiles and airplanes and routinely traveled by sea to his field work in Alaska. He continued to use horse-pack trains while working in the field for as long as the USGS permitted it. His support of public transportation also helped him fulfill his commitment to making geology accessible to the public by writing field guides that could be understood by laymen and did not require long trips by car to see the relevant sites. Some of his most popular field guides include Streetcar to Subduction and Other Plate Tectonic Trips by Public Transport in San Francisco, A Walker's Guide to the Geology of San Francisco, and The Hayward Fault in Hayward and Fremont, via BART. Wahrhaftig was also the co-author of two geology textbooks. Streetcar to Subduction has been revisited in digital form with a Google Earth-based online field trip guide series Streetcar2Subduction released in December 2019 at the American Geophysical Union Fall Meeting in recognition of the 35th anniversary of the original book and the 100th anniversary of Wahrhaftig's birth.

Wahrhaftig spent most of his career as a closeted homosexual, but he came out as a gay man during his acceptance speech for the Geological Society of America's "Distinguished Career Award" in 1989. He had a close personal and professional relationship with the geophysicist Allan Cox that lasted until Cox's death in 1987.

Wahrhaftig died of heart failure in San Francisco at the age of 74.

== Scientific work ==
Wahrhaftig made significant scientific contributions to the field of geology; his work is credited with inspiring the research of many colleagues and students. He was known for his systematic and meticulous field observations. His 1959 paper on Alaskan rock glaciers (co-authored with Allan Cox) inspired a world-wide surge in research on rock glaciers. Wahrhaftig's 1965 paper "Stepped Topography of the Southern Sierra Nevada" was awarded the Geological Society of America (GSA) Kirk Bryan Award. He was one of the first Bay Area scientists to bring the role of plate tectonics in causing earthquakes to public awareness. He was also a pioneer in applying geological science to environmental problems, with a particular focus on forest management practices (e.g., effects of logging on soil erosion). He was appointed to the California Board of Forestry in 1975, where he advocated for forest practices legislation that took a long-term perspective on geomorphological effects of forest management.

Wahrhaftig was given the GSA's Distinguished Career Award in 1989.

Wahrhaftig was largely responsible for paleomagnetist Allan Cox entering the field of geology, and considered this to be one of his major accomplishments in the field. In 1950 and 1951, Wahrhaftig hired Cox (then an undergraduate chemistry major) to be a field assistant in Alaska. Cox later described the rock glacier research as "one of the most interesting and exciting projects" he'd ever worked on; the rock glacier work also brought Cox's attention to the issue of rock dating. After 2 years of army service (during which Wahrhaftig continued to send him geology books), Cox returned to the university and changed his area of study to geophysics. The rock glacier work was published as Wahrhaftig and Cox (1959).

Wahrhaftig and his graduate students at UC Berkeley spent decades mapping the effects of the Tioga glaciation in the Yosemite National Park area, but his map was not finished at the time of his death in 1994. He left a bequest for its completion, and the task was taken up by Yosemite Park geologist Greg Stock. The completed map was published online in 2019.

== Publications ==
- Wahrhaftig, Clyde (1949). "The frost-moved rubbles of Jumbo Dome and their significance in the Pleistocene chronology of Alaska". Journal of Geology. 57 (2): 216–231. Bibcode:1949JG.....57..216W. doi:10.1086/625598. S2CID 73621673.
- Wahrhaftig, Clyde (1958). Quaternary Geology of the Nenana River and adjacent parts of the Alaska Range, Alaska (USGS Professional Paper 393A) (PDF). United States Geological Survey.
- Wahrhaftig, Clyde; Allan Cox (1959). "Rock Glaciers in the Alaska Range". Geological Society of America Bulletin. 70 (4): 383. Bibcode:1959GSAB...70..383W. doi:10.1130/0016-7606(1959)70[383:RGITAR]2.0.CO;2. ISSN 0016-7606.
- Wahrhaftig, Clyde (1965). Physiographic divisions of Alaska (PDF) (3rd ed.). United States Geological Survey.
- Wahrhaftig, Clyde; Birman, JH (1965). "The Quaternary of the Pacific mountain system in California". In Wright, HE; Frey, DG (eds.). The Quaternary of the United States. Princeton University Press. pp. 299–340.
- Wahrhaftig, Clyde (1965). "Stepped Topography of the Southern Sierra Nevada, California". Geological Society of America Bulletin. 76 (10): 1165. Bibcode:1965GSAB...76.1165W. doi:10.1130/0016-7606(1965)76[1165:STOTSS]2.0.CO;2. ISSN 0016-7606.
- Bateman, Paul & Wahrhaftig, Clyde (1966). "Geology of the Sierra Nevada". In Bailey, Edgar (ed.). Geology of Northern California (Bulletin 190). California Division of Mines and Geology. pp. 105–172.
- Wahrhaftig, C; Wagner, JR (1972). "The Geologic Setting of Tomales Bay". In Corwin, R (ed.). Tomales Bay Environmental Study. The Conservation Foundation (Washington, DC).
- Wahrhaftig, Clyde (1984). "Structure of the Marin Headlands Block, California: A Progress Report". In Blake, M.C. (ed.). Franciscan Geology of Northern California. SEPM. pp. 31–50.
- Wahrhaftig, Clyde (1984). A Streetcar to Subduction and Other Plate Tectonic Trips by Public Transport in San Francisco (Revised ed.). American Geophysical Union.
- Wahrhaftig, Clyde (1984). "Geomorphology and glacial geology, Wolverton and Crescent Meadow areas and vicinity, Sequoia National Park, California (Open-File Report 84-400)". United States Geological Survey. doi:10.3133/ofr84400.
- Huber, NK; Bateman, PC; Wahrhaftig, Clyde (1989). Geologic map of Yosemite National Park and vicinity (USGS Miscellaneous Investigations Series Map I–1874). United States Geological Survey.
- Wahrhaftig, Clyde (2000). Geologic map of the Tower Peak quadrangle, central Sierra Nevada, California (USGS Geological Investigations Series I-2697). United States Geological Survey.
- Wahrhaftig, Clyde; Stock, Greg M.; McCracken, Reba G.; Sasnett, Peri; Cyr, Andrew J. (2019). "Extent of the Last Glacial Maximum (Tioga) Glaciation in Yosemite National Park and Vicinity, California". Scientific Investigations Map. United States Geological Survey. doi:10.3133/sim3414. S2CID 199092600.
