= Keith Runcorn =

British geophysicist (1922 – 1995)

Keith Runcorn FRS
- Born: Stanley Keith Runcorn; 19 November 1922; Southport, England, United Kingdom
- Died: 5 December 1995 (aged 73); San Diego, California, United States
- Education: University of Cambridge (BA); University of Manchester (PhD)
- Known for: reestablishing viability of the theory of continental drift; discoveries in planetary magnetism
- Awards: The Chree Medal and Prize (1969); Vetlesen Prize (1970); RAS Gold Medal (1984)
- Scientific career
- Fields: Plate tectonics Paleomagnetism
- Workplaces: University of Cambridge; University of Manchester; Newcastle University; University of Alaska, Fairbanks
- Thesis: Investigations relating to the main geomagnetic field (1949)
- Doctoral advisor: Patrick Blackett

(Stanley) Keith Runcorn FRS (19 November 1922 – 5 December 1995) was a British physicist whose paleomagnetic reconstruction of the relative motions of Europe and America revived the theory of continental drift and was a major contribution to plate tectonics.

== Education and early life ==
Runcorn was born in Southport, Lancashire, and educated at King George V Grammar School and Gonville and Caius College, Cambridge, whence he graduated in engineering within two years in 1942. After a period in radar research during the World War II, he joined the Physics Department at the University of Manchester where he did research on aspects of the Earth's magnetic field, taking his PhD for research supervised by Patrick Blackett in 1949.

== Career and research ==
Runcorn's PhD led to his interest in palaeomagnetism, the study of the magnetism of rocks, which he pursued first at the Geophysics Department at the University of Cambridge and later at Newcastle University, where he was appointed to the chair of Physics in 1956. At Newcastle, Runcorn developed a strong research group in geophysics, and made substantial contributions to various fields, including convection in the Earth and Moon, the shape and magnetic fields of the Moon and planets, magnetohydrodynamics of the Earth's core, changes in the length of the day, polar wandering, continental drift and plate tectonics. After his retirement in 1988 he continued to be active in various lines of research until his untimely death in San Diego in 1995.

=== Awards and honours ===
Runcorn received many honours, including Fellowship of the Royal Society in 1965, the Gold Medal of the Royal Astronomical Society (RAS) and the Fleming medal of the American Geophysical Union (AGU). He was also a member of the Pontifical Academy of Sciences. In 1970 he was awarded the Vetlesen Prize, widely considered the highest honor in geology. In 1981, Runcorn became a founding member of the World Cultural Council. He served as the Sydney Chapman Endowed Chair in Physical Sciences at the University of Alaska from 1989 to 1995. In 2007 the RAS named an award – for the year's best PhD thesis in geophysics – the Keith Runcorn Prize in his honour.

=== Refereed journal publications ===
- —; Chapman, S (1 October 1948). "The Radial Variation of the Earth's Magnetic Field". Proceedings of the Physical Society. 61 (4): 373–382. Bibcode:1948PPS....61..373R. doi:10.1088/0959-5309/61/4/310.
- — (10 January 1948). "Variation of Geomagnetic Intensity with Depth". Nature. 161 (4080): 52. Bibcode:1948Natur.161...52R. doi:10.1038/161052b0. S2CID 4101337.
- —; Benson, A. C.; Moore, A. F. (27 November 1951). "Measurements of the Variation with Depth of the Main Geomagnetic Field". Philosophical Transactions of the Royal Society A: Mathematical, Physical and Engineering Sciences. 244 (878): 113–151. Bibcode:1951RSPTA.244..113R. doi:10.1098/rsta.1951.0017. S2CID 122914565.
- — (April 1955). "Rock magnetism—Geophysical aspects". Advances in Physics. 4 (14): 244–291. Bibcode:1955AdPhy...4..244R. doi:10.1080/00018735500101214.
- Collinson, D. W.; Creer, K. M.; Irving, E.; Runcorn, S. K. (29 August 1957). "The Measurement of the Permanent Magnetization of Rocks". Philosophical Transactions of the Royal Society A: Mathematical, Physical and Engineering Sciences. 250 (974): 73–82. Bibcode:1957RSPTA.250...73C. doi:10.1098/rsta.1957.0012. S2CID 123560074.
- Irving, E.; Runcorn, S. K. (29 August 1957). "Analysis of the Palaeomagnetism of the Torridonian Sandstone Series of North-West Scotland. I". Philosophical Transactions of the Royal Society A: Mathematical, Physical and Engineering Sciences. 250 (974): 83–99. Bibcode:1957RSPTA.250...83I. doi:10.1098/rsta.1957.0013. S2CID 123618344.
- Creer, K. M.; E. Irving; A. E. M. Nairn; S. K. Runcorn (1958). "Palaeomagnetic results from different continents and their relation to the problem of continental drift". Annales de Géophysique. 14: 492–501. Bibcode:1958AnG....14..492C.
- Collinson, D. W.; S. K. Runcorn (1960). "Polar wandering and continental drift - evidence from paleomagnetic observations in the United States". Geological Society of America Bulletin. 71 (7): 915–958. Bibcode:1960GSAB...71..915C. doi:10.1130/0016-7606(1960)71[915:PWACDE]2.0.CO;2.
- Opdyke, N. D.; Runcorn, S. K. (1960). "Wind direction in the western United States in the late Paleozoic". Geological Society of America Bulletin. 71 (7): 959. Bibcode:1960GSAB...71..959O. doi:10.1130/0016-7606(1960)71[959:WDITWU]2.0.CO;2.
- — (15 October 1964). "Satellite gravity measurements and a laminar viscous flow model of the Earth's mantle". Journal of Geophysical Research. 69 (20): 4389–4394. Bibcode:1964JGR....69.4389R. doi:10.1029/JZ069i020p04389.
- — (28 November 1964). "Changes in the Earth's Moment of Inertia". Nature. 204 (4961): 823–825. Bibcode:1964Natur.204..823R. doi:10.1038/204823a0. S2CID 4247143.
- — (26 January 2010). "Flow in the mantle inferred from the Low Degree harmonics of the geopotential". Geophysical Journal of the Royal Astronomical Society. 14 (1–4): 375–384. doi:10.1111/j.1365-246X.1967.tb06253.x.
- — (7 February 1967). "Convection in the Moon and the existence of a lunar core". Proceedings of the Royal Society A: Mathematical, Physical and Engineering Sciences. 296 (1446): 270–284. Bibcode:1967RSPSA.296..270R. doi:10.1098/rspa.1967.0021. S2CID 120231002.
- — (27 February 1975). "An ancient lunar magnetic dipole field". Nature. 253 (5494): 701–703. Bibcode:1975Natur.253..701R. doi:10.1038/253701a0. S2CID 4249864.
- — (August 1975). "On the interpretation of lunar magnetism". Physics of the Earth and Planetary Interiors. 10 (4): 327–335. Bibcode:1975PEPI...10..327R. doi:10.1016/0031-9201(75)90059-X.
- —; Lambeck, K.; Winch, D. E. (20 August 1982). "The role of the core in irregular fluctuations of the Earth's rotation and the excitation of the Chandler wobble". Philosophical Transactions of the Royal Society A: Mathematical, Physical and Engineering Sciences. 306 (1492): 261–270. Bibcode:1982RSPTA.306..261R. doi:10.1098/rsta.1982.0086. S2CID 119519578.

=== Popularizations ===
- — (September 1955). "The Earth's Magnetism". Scientific American. 193 (3): 152–162. Bibcode:1955SciAm.193c.152R. doi:10.1038/scientificamerican0955-152.
- — (October 1966). "Corals as paleontological clocks". Scientific American. 215 (4): 26–33. Bibcode:1966SciAm.215d..26R. doi:10.1038/scientificamerican1066-26.
- — (December 1987). "The Moon's ancient magnetism". Scientific American. 257 (6): 60–68. Bibcode:1987SciAm.257f..60R. doi:10.1038/scientificamerican1287-60.

=== Edited books ===
- Ahrens, L. H.; Rankama, K.; Runcorn, S. K., eds. (1956). Physics and Chemistry of the Earth. Pergamon Press.
- Runcorn, S. K., ed. (31 December 1960). Methods and Techniques in Geophysics: v. 1. John Wiley & Sons. ISBN 978-0470745144.
- Continental drift (1962), S.K. Runcorn.
- Runcorn, S. K., ed. (1 January 1966). Methods and Techniques in Geophysics: v. 2. John Wiley & Sons. ISBN 978-0470745182.
- International dictionary of geophysics : seismology, geomagnetism, aeronomy, oceanography, geodesy, gravity, marine geophysics, meteorology, the earth as a planet and its evolution (1967), ed.
- Runcorn, S. K., ed. (1 January 1968). Mantles of the Earth and Terrestrial Planets. John Wiley & Sons. ISBN 978-0470745212.
- Methods in palaeomagnetism: Proceedings of the NATO Advanced Study Institute on Palaeomagnetic Methods (1967), edited by D.W. Collinson, K.M. Creer, S.K. Runcorn
- Runcorn, S. K., ed. (1970). Palaeogeophysics. London: Academic Press. ISBN 978-0126027501.
- Earth Sciences (1971), S.K. Runcorn
- Implications of continental drift to the earth sciences (1973) NATO Advanced Study Institute, D.H. Tarling and S.K. Runcorn
- Mechanisms of continental drift and plate tectonics (1980) edited by P. A. Davies and S. K. Runcorn
- Magnetism, planetary rotation, and convection in the solar system : retrospect and prospect : in honour of Prof. S.K. Runcorn (1985) edited by W. O'Reilly, S. K. Runcorn
- Runcorn, S. K., ed. (1988). The Physics of the planets : their origin, evolution and structure (Fac-sim ed.). Chichester: Wiley. ISBN 9780471916215.

== Death ==
Runcorn was murdered in his hotel room in San Diego during a lecture trip to the Scripps Institution of Oceanography. Police found that he had been strangled and found evidence of injuries to the head. Paul Cain, a professional kick-boxer, was later convicted and sentenced to a term of at least 25 years. Prosecutors argued that Cain killed Runcorn after stealing his wallet and credit cards, having targeted him as an elderly gay man and therefore easy victim. Cain was tried three times in all. The first trial ended with a deadlocked jury; the second with a conviction that was overturned on appeal, on grounds that testimony from Cain's two previous wives as to his violent temper should not have been admitted in evidence.
